= Deanery of Prostějov =

Deanery of Prostějov Decanatus Prostannensis Děkanát Prostějov
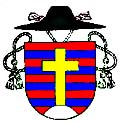

Location
- Country: Czech Republic

Statistics
- Area: 460 km^{2} (180 sq mi)
- Population: Total; Catholics: (as of 2013); 91,000; 31,000 (34,07%)

Information
- Denomination: Catholic Church
- Sui iuris church: Latin Church
- Rite: Roman Rite
- Diocese: Archdiocese of Olomouc

Current leadership
- Pope: Leo XIV
- Metropolitan Archbishop: Jan Graubner
- Dean: Aleš Vrzala

Website
- dpv.cz

The Deanery of Prostějov (Latin: Decanatus Prostannensis) lies in the Archdiocese of Olomouc, Czech Republic. There were reported to be 31,000 members of Catholic Church within the deanery. The deanery has 8 diocesan and 14 religious (MIC, SDB, SDS) priests and covers 34 parishes with 93 churches and chapels.

== Deans ==
- – 2016 R. D. Miroslav Hřib
- 2016 – R. D. Aleš Vrzala

== Parishes ==
Parish	Parish church	Administrator	Web
Brodek u Prostějova	Church of the Exaltation of the Holy Cross	R. D. Pavel Šíra	
Čehovice	Church of Saint Procopius	R. D. Jan Józef Pachołek, ThLic.	
Dobromilice	All Saints Church	R. D. Franciszek Marek Jarosz	
Drahany	Church of Saint John the Baptist	R. D. Jan Plodr	–
Dubany	Church of the Nativity of the Blessed Virgin Mary	R. D. Antonín Koman SDB	–
Hruška	Church of Saint John of Nepomuk	R. D. Tomáš Strogan	–
Klenovice na Hané	Church of Saint Bartholomew	R. D. Jan Józef Pachołek	
Kostelec na Hané	Church of Saint James the Greater	R. D. Stanislav Matyáš	
Kralice na Hané	Church of the Assumption of Mary into Heaven	R. D. Jan Józef Pachołek	
Krumsín	Church of Saint Bartholomew	R. D. Zdeněk Jiří Pospíšilík	–
Mostkovice	Church of the Assumption of Mary into Heaven	R. D. Zdeněk Jiří Pospíšilík	
Myslejovice	Church of the Visitation of the Blessed Virgin Mary	R. D. Adam Leszek Rackowiak	
Němčice nad Hanou'	Church of Saint Mary Magdalene	R.D. Tomáš Strogan	–
Nezamyslice na Hané	Church of Saint Wenceslas	R. D. Franciszek Marek Jarosz	–
Ohrozim	Church of Saint Wenceslas	R. D. Stanislav Matyáš	
Olšany u Prostějova	Church of Saint John the Baptist	R. D. Antonín Koman S.D.B.	–
Otaslavice	Church of Saint Archangel Michael	R. D. Pavel Šíra	
Pavlovice u Kojetína	Church of Saint Andrew	R. D. Tomáš Strogan	–
Pivín	Church of Saint George	R. D. Andrzej Kaliciak S.D.S.	
Plumlov	Holy Trinity Church	R. D. Zdeněk Jiří Pospíšilík	–
Prostějov – Exaltation of the Holy Cross	Church of the Exaltation of the Holy Cross, Prostějov	R. D. Aleš Vrzala	
Prostějov – Saints Peter and Paul	Church of Saints Peter and Paul	R. D. Pavel Maria Čáp S.D.B.	
Prostějov – Vrahovice	Church of Saint Bartholomew	R. D. Josef Glogar S.D.B.	–
Rozstání	Church of Saint Archangel Michael	R. D. Jan Plodr	–
Smržice	Church of Saints Peter and Paul	R. D. Josef Glogar S.D.B.	–
Tištín	Church of Saints Peter and Paul	R. D. Franciszek MarekJarosz	–
Určice	Church of Saint John the Baptist	R. D. Leszek Adam Rackowiak	
Vícov	Church of Saint Florian	R. D. Stanislav Matyáš	
Vranovice u Prostějova	Church of Saint Kunigunde	R. D. Leszek Adam Rackowiak	
Vrchoslavice	Church of Saint Michael	R. D. Tomáš Strogan	–
Vřesovice	Church of Saints Peter and Paul	R. D. Andrzej Kaliciak S.D.S.	–
Výšovice	Church of Saint Lawrence	R. D. Andrzej Kaliciak S.D.S	–
Želeč u Prostějova	Church of Saint Bartholomew	R. D. Pavel Vágner	
Žešov	Church of Saints Cyril and Methodius	R. D. Leszek Adam Rackowiak S.D.S.	

== Gallery ==
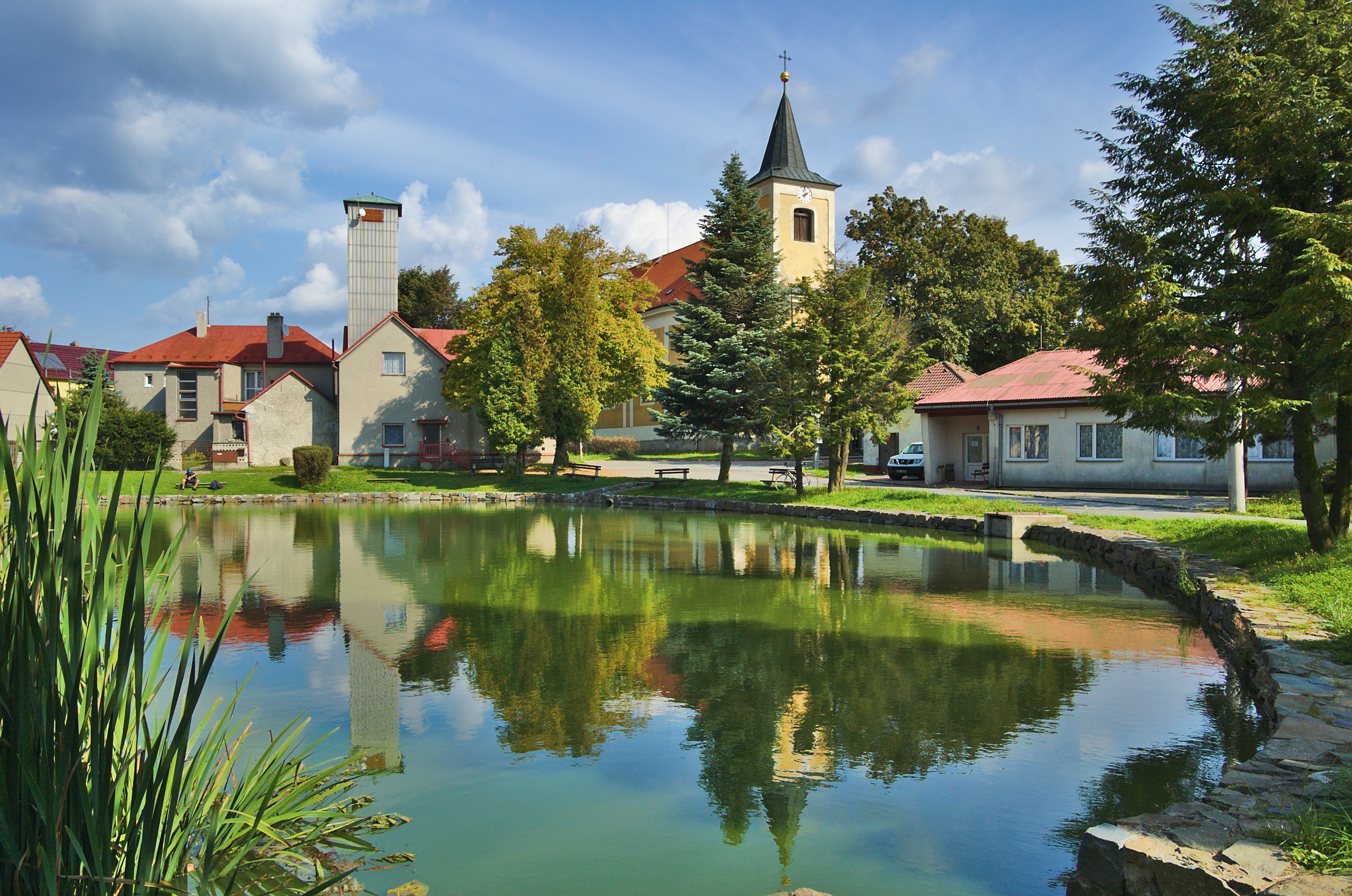
Church of Saint John the Baptist, Drahany

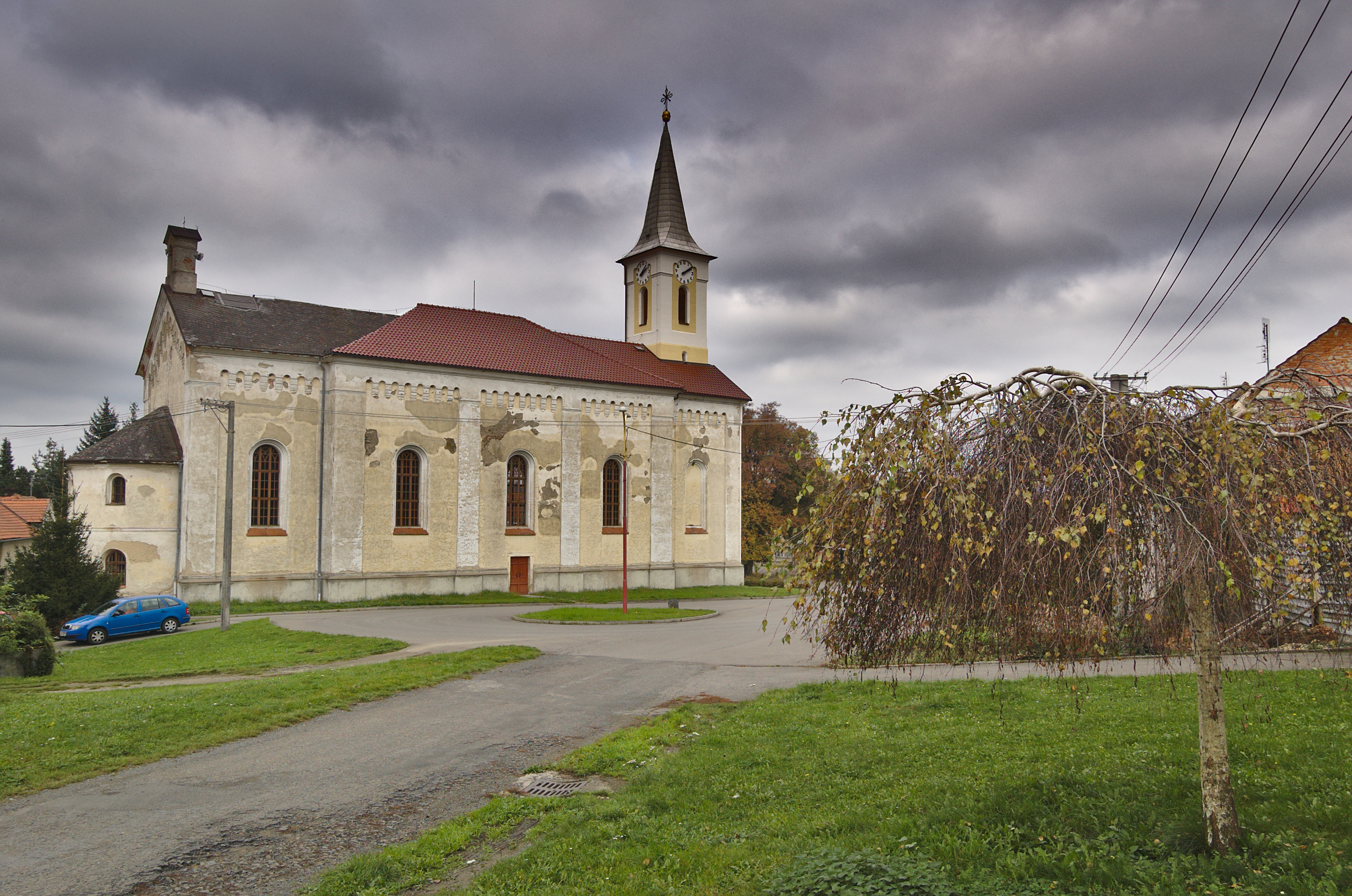
Church of Saint Bartholomew, Krumsín

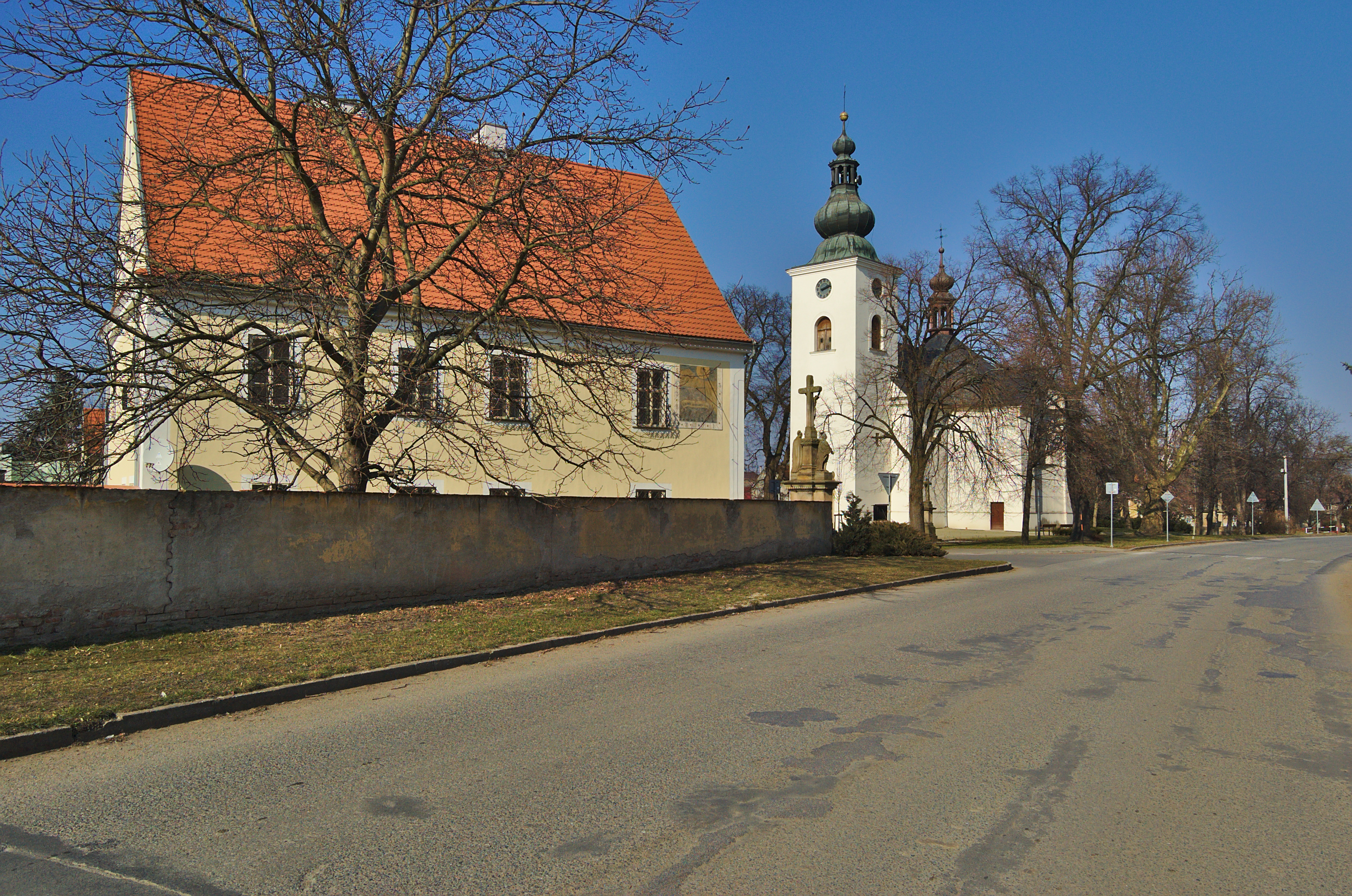
Rectory and Church of Saint John the Baptist, Olšany

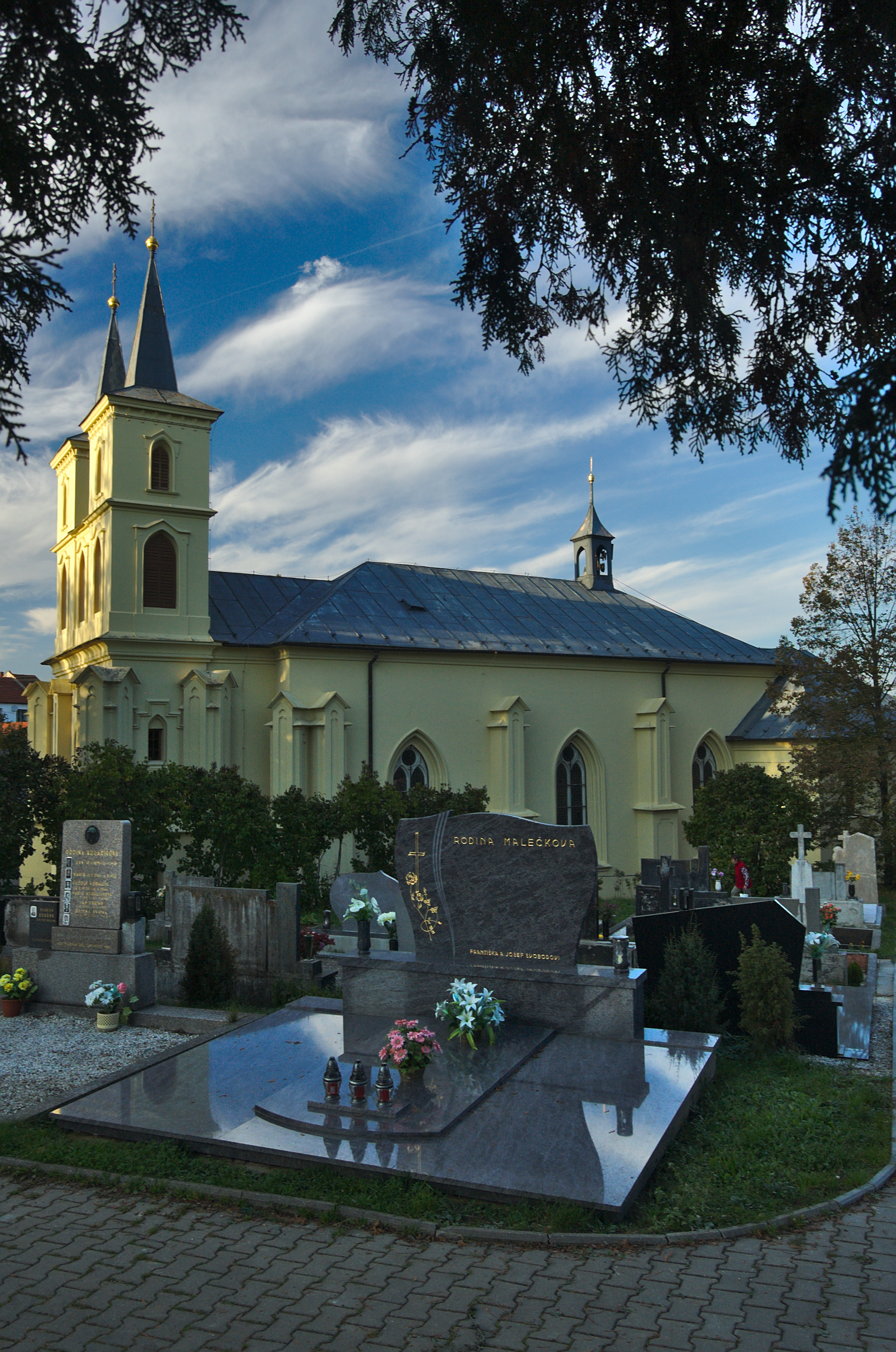
Church of Saint Michael, Otaslavice

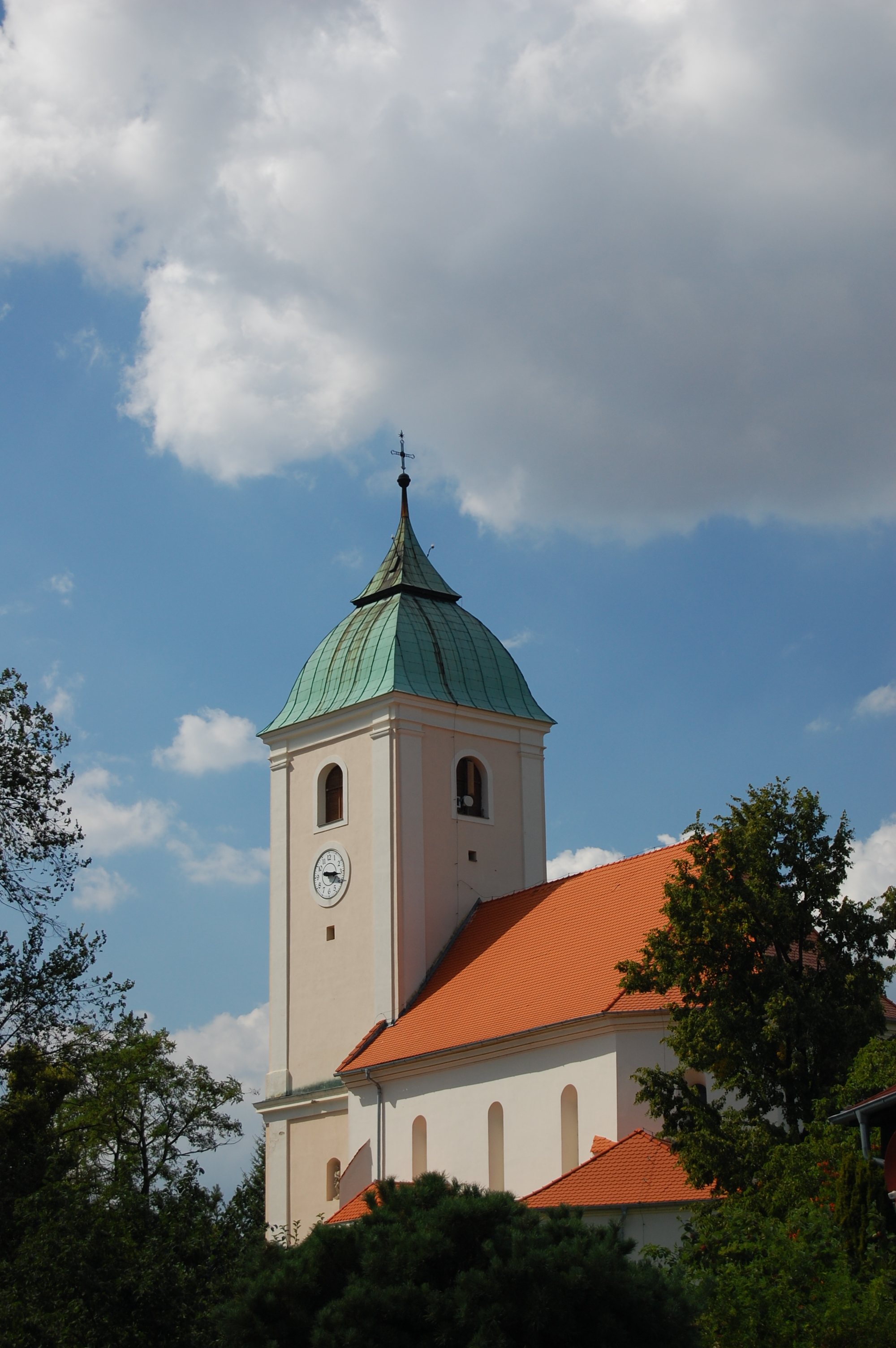
Holy Trinity Church, Plumlov

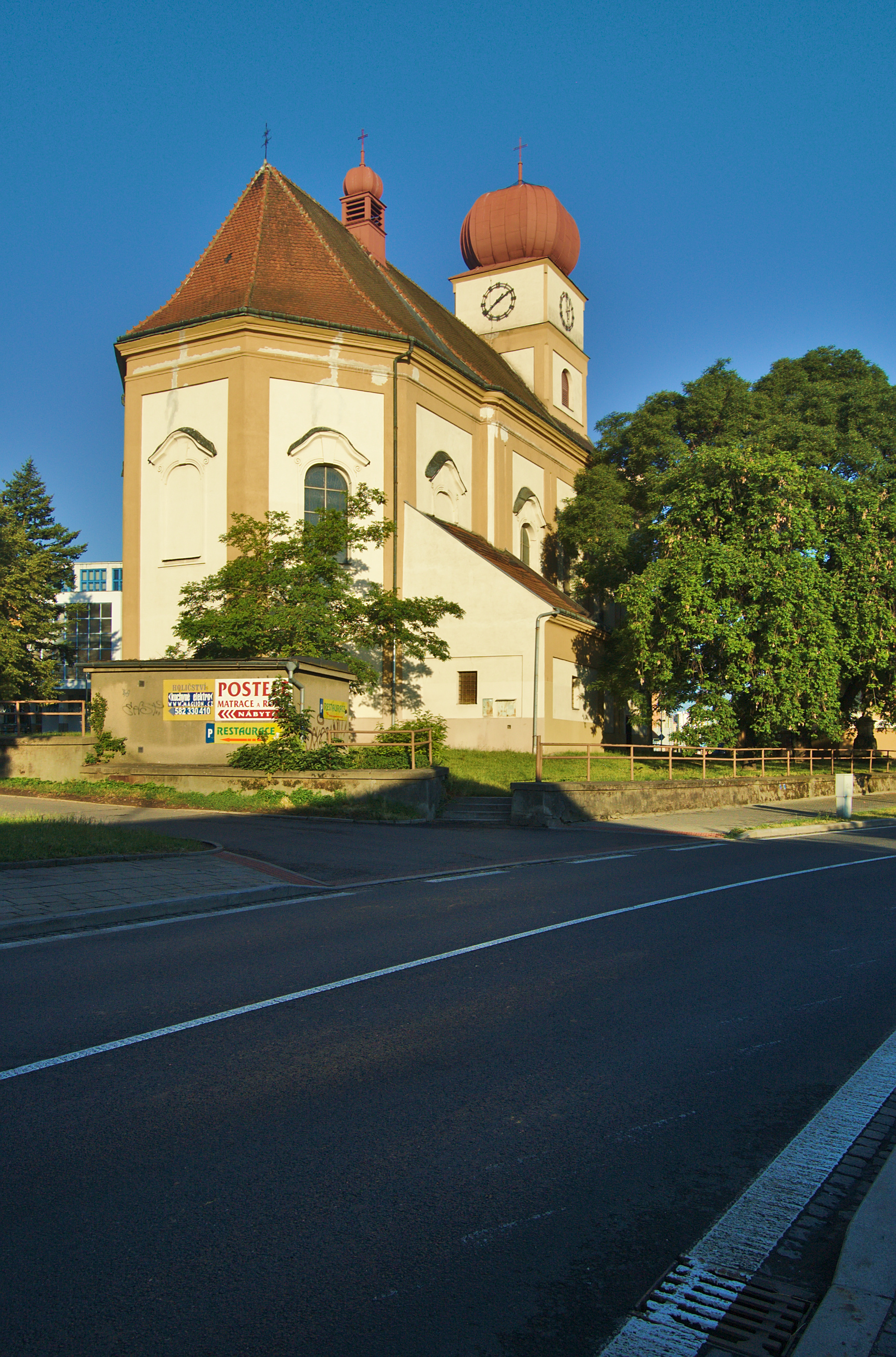
Church of Saints Peter and Paul, Prostějov

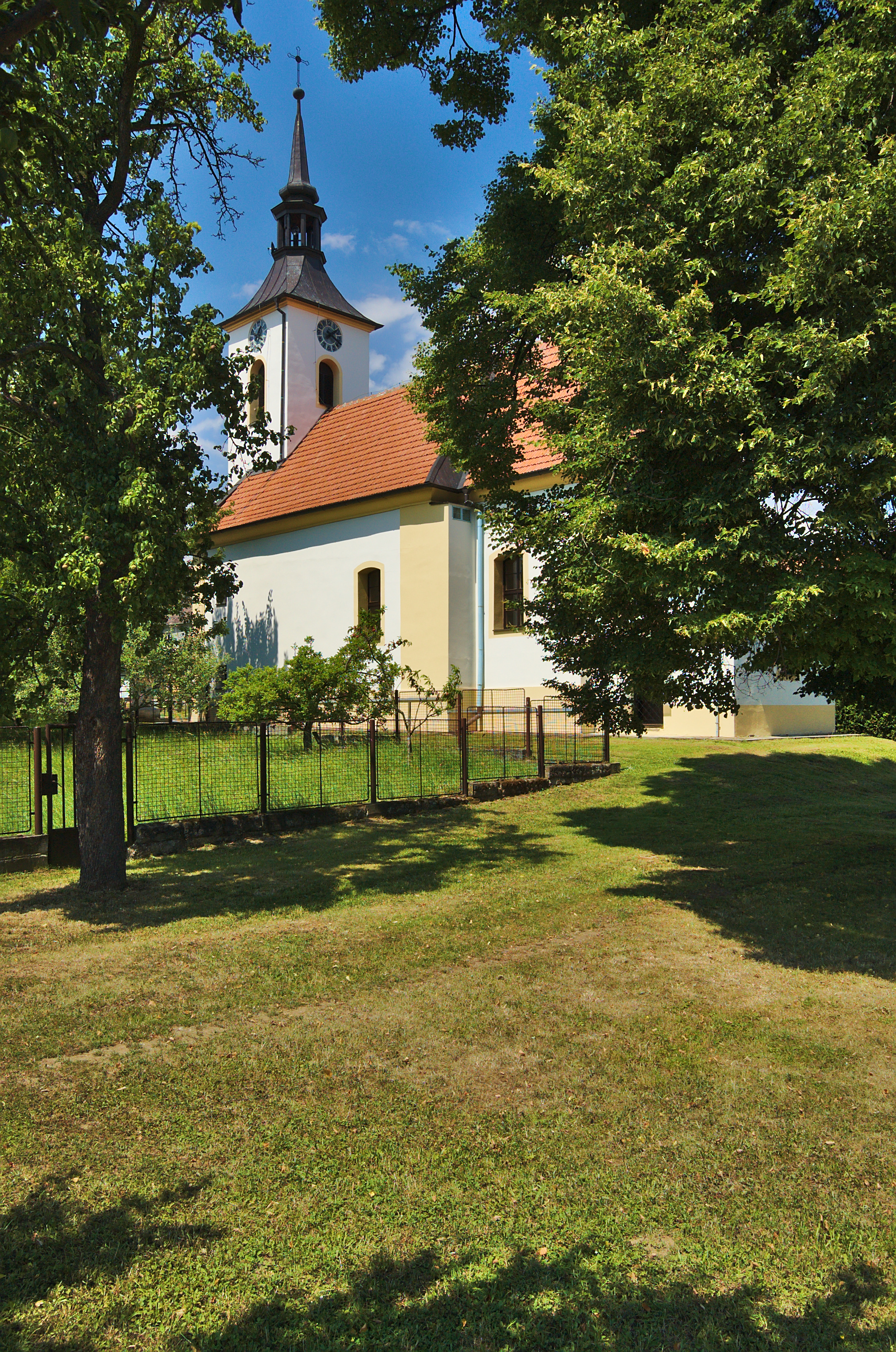
Church of Saint Forian, Vícov
