= Hrushka =

Hrushka (Czech/Slovak: Hruška, Russian/Ukrainian: Грушка) may refer to:

- the Ukrainian name for Hrușca, a commune in Transnistria, Moldova
- the Romanized version of the surname Gruszka
- David Allan Hrushka (fl. 2008), Canadian politician
- Father Hryhoriii Hrushka, founder of the newspaper Svoboda, Jersey City, New Jersey, U.S.

== See also ==
- Gruszka (disambiguation), including Gruschka and Grushka
- Hruška (disambiguation)
- Hruška (surname), including Hruska, Hruszka, Hruschka, Hrushka
