= Hrušky =

Hrušky may refer to places in the Czech Republic:

- Hrušky (Břeclav District), a municipality and village in the South Moravian Region
- Hrušky (Vyškov District), a municipality and village in the South Moravian Region
  - Hrušky oil field, an oil field

== See also ==
- Hruška (disambiguation)
