= Hruška (disambiguation) =

Hruška is a Czech-language surname.

Hruška may also refer to:

- 18841 Hruška, a minor planet
- Hruška (Prostějov District), a municipality and village in the Olomouc Region of the Czech Republic

== See also ==
- Hrušky (disambiguation)
