= Church of the Exaltation of the Holy Cross, Prostějov =

Church of the Exaltation of the Holy Cross
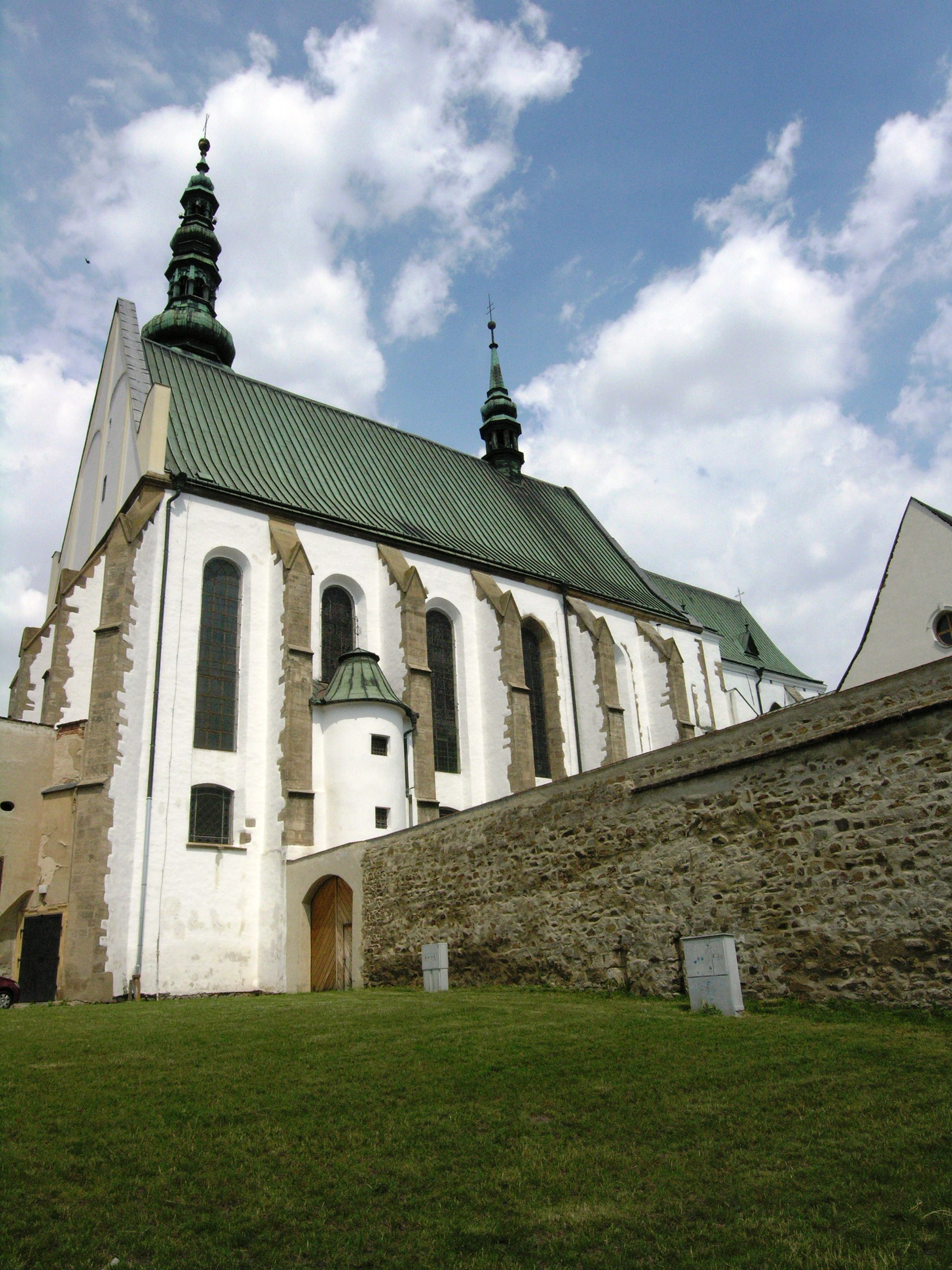
- Church of the Exaltation of the Holy Cross
- 49°28′18.34″N 17°6′43.87″E
- Location: Prostějov
- Country: Czech Republic
- Denomination: Roman Catholic Church

History
- Former name: Church of the Holy Cross
- Founder: Petr of Kravaře
- Dedicated: 16 September 1703

Architecture
- Architect: Giovanni Pietro Tencalla
- Style: Gothic and Baroque

Specifications
- Capacity: 1,400 people
- Length: 50 metres (160 ft)
- Width: 14 metres (46 ft)
- Height: 18 metres (59 ft)

Administration
- Archdiocese: Olomouc
- Deanery: Prostějov

Clergy
- Dean: R. D. Aleš Vrzala

The Church of the Exaltation of the Holy Cross (Czech: Kostel Povýšení svatého Kříže) is a Catholic parish church in Prostějov in the Olomouc Region of the Czech Republic. It is dedicated to the Exaltation of the Holy Cross. The building is the landmark of the city and it is its oldest monument.

== History ==
The church was founded together with an Augustinian monastery on the site of the original fortress in 1391 by nobleman Petr of Kravaře. The monastery was consecrated to Visitation of the Blessed Virgin Mary at Elizabeth in the Mountains Shortly after its building-up, in 1430, it was burnt out by the Hussites. Within the years 1522 and 1588, it was restored by the Utraquists.

Together with the city, the church had to withstand a huge devastating fire in 1697 when it was completely destroyed. From the time of the conflagration only a wooden cross was saved during that fire. On the request of parishioners and with the permission of the Bishop of Olomouc, Miraculous Cross was placed on the High Altar in 1703.

Walls of the presbytery are decorated with frescos by Jano Köhler. During the Feast of the Cross on 14 September, the traditional city pilgrimage is held there every year.

== Way of the Cross ==
Parish priest Karel Dostál-Lutinov asked František Bílek to create the series of Way of the Cross for the church in 1904. Bílek created painting composition drafts for all original paintings and he himself painted 11th and 13th station of the Cross. He described he had supernatural visions and received special knowledge. When working on the work, he felt the presence of Almighty, as he himself said. He was sure that the God guided his hand. He completed his work in 1905. The entire costs of CZK 10,000 were paid by factory owner Wichterle.
