= Hruška =

Hruška (feminine Hrušková) is a Czech and Slovak occupational surname, which means a grower or seller of pears, from hruška ("pear"). The name may refer to:

- Aleš Hruška (born 1985), Czech footballer
- David Hruška (born 1977), Czech ice hockey player
- Franz Hruska (1888–1977), German politician
- Jan Hruška (born 1975), Czech cyclist
- Karel Hruška (1891–1966), Czech actor and singer
- Květa Hrušková, Czech table tennis player
- Laura Chapman Hruska (1935–2010), American writer and publisher
- Luboš Hruška (born 1987), Czech footballer
- Martin Hruška (born 1981), Czech footballer
- Matúš Hruška (born 1994), Slovak footballer
- Milan Hruška (born 1985), Slovak ice hockey player
- Nina Hrušková-Bělská, Czech chess player
- Petr Hruška (poet) (born 1964), Czech writer
- Rachelle Hruska (born 1983), American businesswoman
- Radim Hruška (born 1984), Czech ice hockey player
- Roman Hruska (1904–1999), American politician
- Rudolf Hruska (1915–1995), Austrian automobile designer
- Sharon Brown-Hruska (born 1959), American finance analyst
- Vladimír Hruška (born 1957), Czech football player and manager
- Zdeněk Hruška (born 1954), Czech footballer

== See also ==
- Gruszka (Polish form)
- Hruşca (Romanian form)
