= Hrušky oil field =

Oil field in Hrušky, Czech Republic

Hrušky
- Location within Czech Republic
- Country: Czech Republic
- Region: Vyškov District
- Location: Hrušky
- Offshore/onshore: onshore
- Coordinates: 49°7′32″N 16°50′12″E
- Operator: Unipetrol

Production
- Current production of oil: 3,500 barrels per day (~1.7×10^{5} t/a)
- Estimated oil in place: 11.4 million barrels (~1.56×10^{6} t)
- Estimated gas in place: 2.1×10^{9} m^{3} 73×10^{9} cu ft

The Hrušky oil field is an oil field located in Hrušky, Vyškov District, South Moravian Region. It was discovered in 1990 and developed by Unipetrol. It began production in 1992 and produces oil. The total proven reserves of the Hrušky oil field are around 11.4 million barrels (1.82 million tonnes), and production is centered on 3,500 barrels per day (560 m^{3}/d).

== See also ==
- Energy in the Czech Republic
