= Franz Hruska =

German politician

- Born: 21 November 1888; Dobřany, Bohemia
- Died: 29 April 1977 (aged 88)
- Political party: Social Democratic Party of Germany

Franz Hruska (21 November 1888 – 29 April 1977) was a German politician from the Social Democratic Party of Germany. He was a member of the Landtag of North Rhine-Westphalia between 20 April 1947 and 4 July 1954.
