= Čehovice =

- Municipality
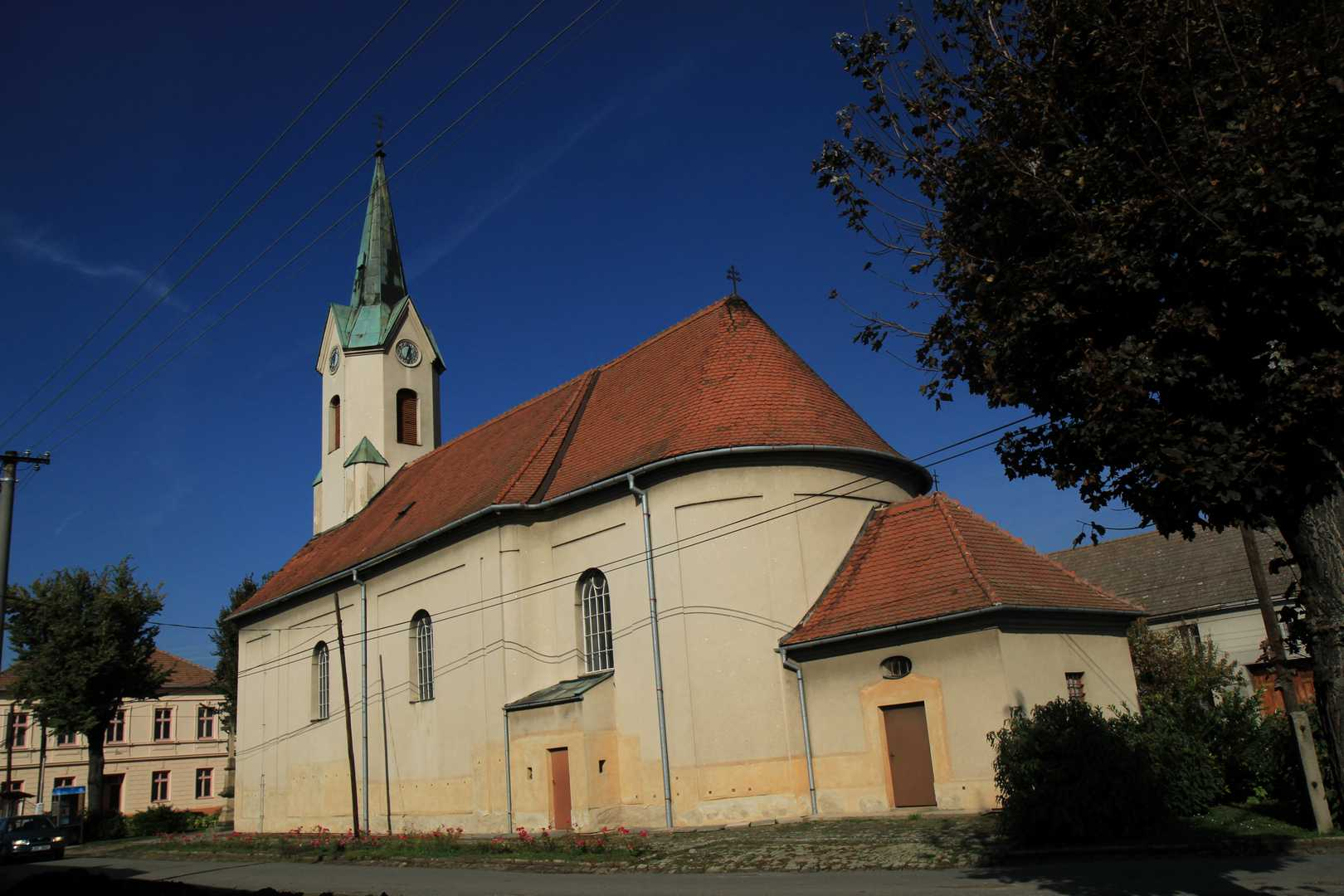
- Church of Saint Procopius

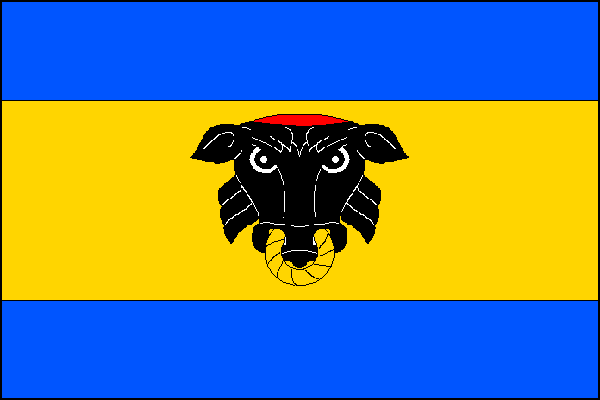
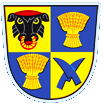
- Flag Coat of arms

- Location in the Czech Republic
- Coordinates: 49°25′57″N 17°10′30″E
- Country: Czech Republic
- Region: Olomouc
- District: Prostějov
- First mentioned: 1287

Area
  - Total: 7.11 km^{2} (2.75 sq mi)
- Elevation: 211 m (692 ft)

Population (2026-01-01)
  - Total: 519
  - Density: 73.0/km^{2} (189/sq mi)
- Time zone: UTC+1 (CET)
  - Summer (DST): UTC+2 (CEST)
- Postal code: 798 21
- Website: cehovice.cz

Čehovice is a municipality and village in Prostějov District in the Olomouc Region of the Czech Republic. It has about 500 inhabitants.

Čehovice lies approximately 7 kilometres (4 mi) south-east of Prostějov, 19 km (12 mi) south of Olomouc, and 212 km (132 mi) east of Prague.

== Demographics ==
Historical population
Year	Pop.	±%
1869	569	—
1880	626	+10.0%
1890	645	+3.0%
1900	708	+9.8%
1910	723	+2.1%
1921	706	−2.4%
1930	710	+0.6%
1950	584	−17.7%
1961	643	+10.1%
1970	583	−9.3%
1980	570	−2.2%
1991	525	−7.9%
2001	520	−1.0%
2011	472	−9.2%
2021	481	+1.9%
Source: Censuses
