= Pivín =

- Municipality
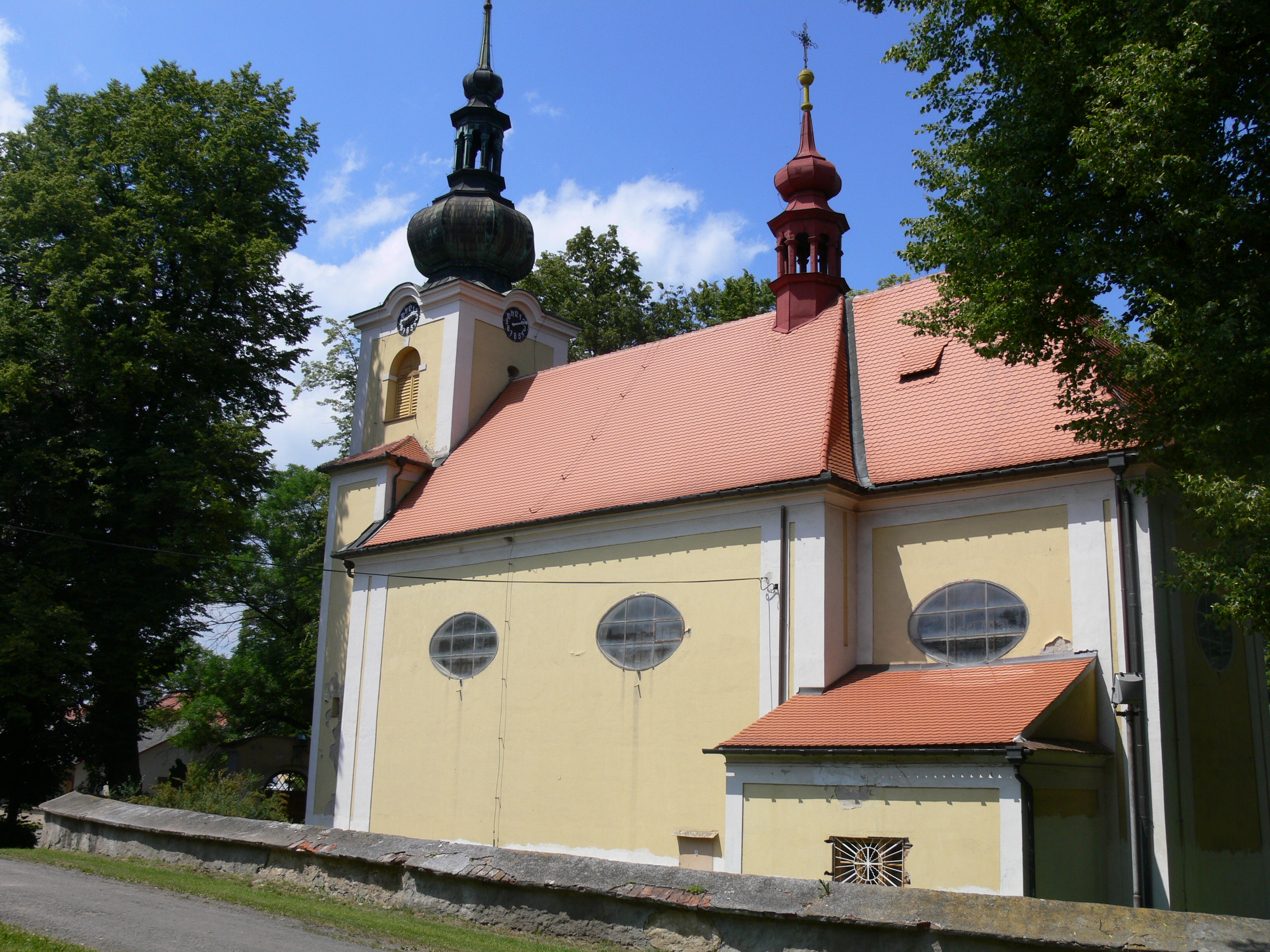
- Church of Saint George

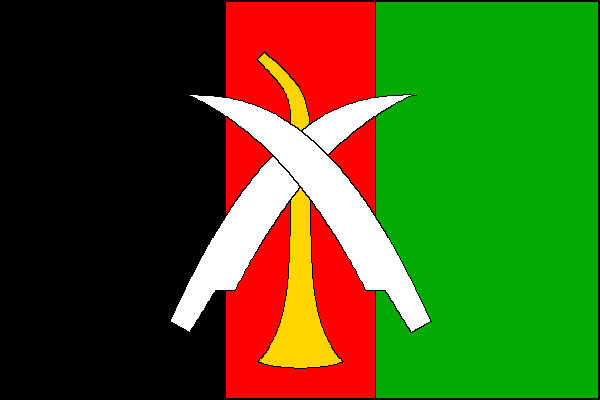
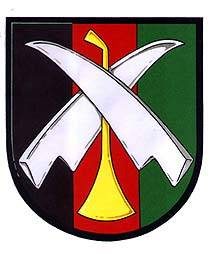
- Flag Coat of arms

- Location in the Czech Republic
- Coordinates: 49°23′5″N 17°11′5″E
- Country: Czech Republic
- Region: Olomouc
- District: Prostějov
- First mentioned: 1321

Area
  - Total: 6.93 km^{2} (2.68 sq mi)
- Elevation: 219 m (719 ft)

Population (2026-01-01)
  - Total: 760
  - Density: 110/km^{2} (280/sq mi)
- Time zone: UTC+1 (CET)
  - Summer (DST): UTC+2 (CEST)
- Postal code: 798 24
- Website: www.pivin.cz

Pivín is a municipality and village in Prostějov District in the Olomouc Region of the Czech Republic. It has about 800 inhabitants.

Pivín lies approximately 12 kilometres (7 mi) south-east of Prostějov, 24 km (15 mi) south of Olomouc, and 214 km (133 mi) east of Prague.

== History ==
The first written mention of Pivín is from 1321.

== Demographics ==
Historical population
| Year | Pop. | ±% |
|---|---|---|
| 1869 | 638 | — |
| 1880 | 675 | +5.8% |
| 1890 | 700 | +3.7% |
| 1900 | 736 | +5.1% |
| 1910 | 746 | +1.4% |
| 1921 | 823 | +10.3% |
| 1930 | 915 | +11.2% |
| 1950 | 807 | −11.8% |
| 1961 | 821 | +1.7% |
| 1970 | 742 | −9.6% |
| 1980 | 726 | −2.2% |
| 1991 | 674 | −7.2% |
| 2001 | 680 | +0.9% |
| 2011 | 703 | +3.4% |
| 2021 | 695 | −1.1% |
Source: Censuses
