= Gruszka (surname) =

Gruszka is a Polish-language surname. It means "pear" in Polish and is most common in southern Poland.

Language	Masculine	Feminine
Polish	Gruszka ([ˈɡruʂka])	
Czech, Slovak	Hruška	Hrušková
Russian (Romanization)	Грушка (Grushka)	
Ukrainian (Romanization)	Грушка (Hrushka, Grushka)	

== People ==
- Danuta Gruszka (born 1970), Polish chess master
- Franciszek Gruszka (1910–1940), Polish fighter pilot
- Józef Gruszka (1947–2020), Polish politician
- Karolina Gruszka (born 1980), Polish actress
- Piotr Gruszka (born 1977), Polish volleyball player
