= Vícov =

- Municipality
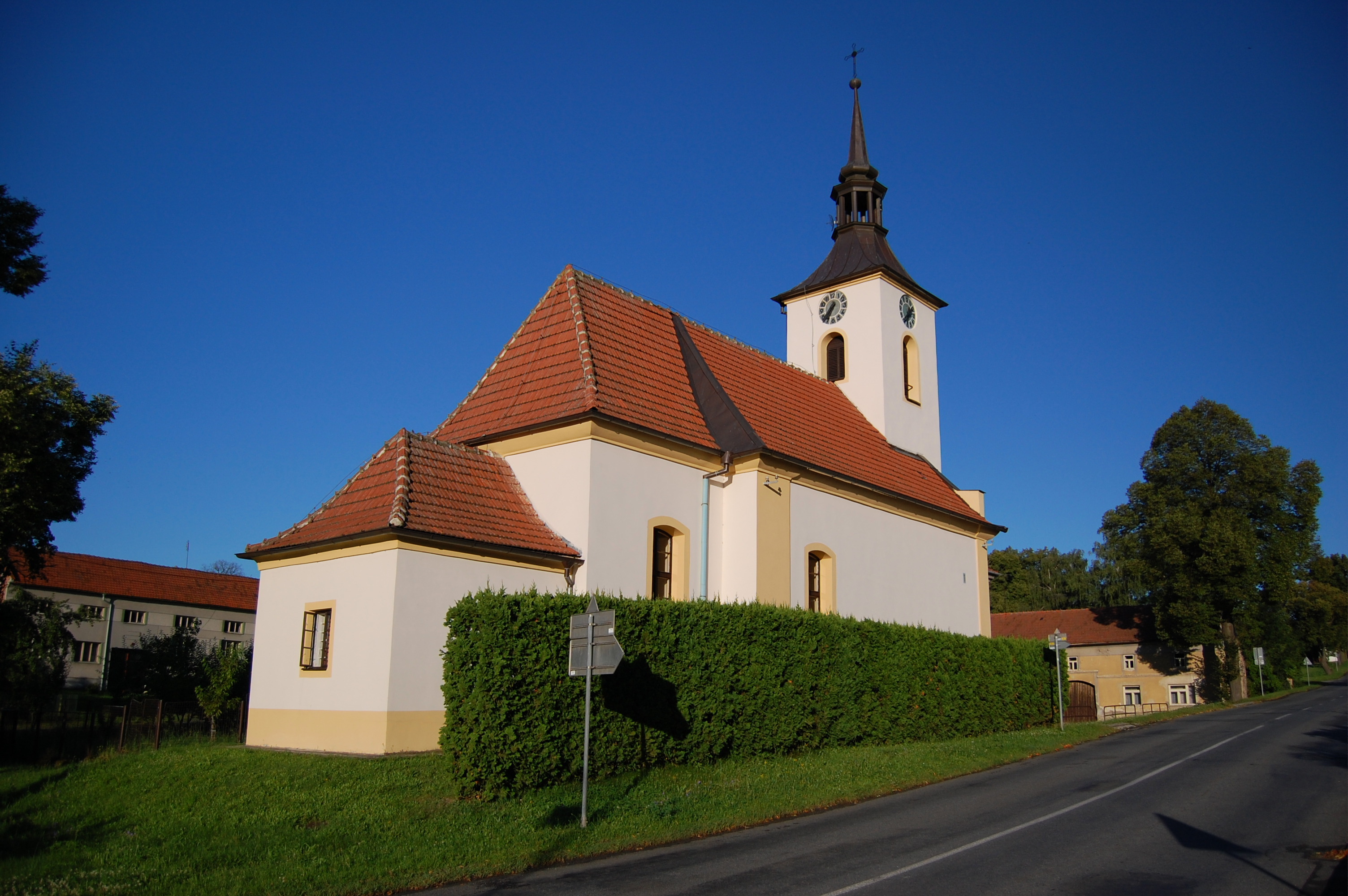
- Church of Saint Florian

- Flag Coat of arms

- Location in the Czech Republic
- Coordinates: 49°29′19″N 16°57′35″E
- Country: Czech Republic
- Region: Olomouc
- District: Prostějov
- First mentioned: 1355

Area
  - Total: 5.99 km^{2} (2.31 sq mi)
- Elevation: 364 m (1,194 ft)

Population (2026-01-01)
  - Total: 580
  - Density: 97/km^{2} (250/sq mi)
- Time zone: UTC+1 (CET)
  - Summer (DST): UTC+2 (CEST)
- Postal code: 798 03
- Website: www.vicov.cz

Vícov is a municipality and village in Prostějov District in the Olomouc Region of the Czech Republic. It has about 600 inhabitants.

Vícov lies approximately 11 kilometres (7 mi) west of Prostějov, 24 km (15 mi) south-west of Olomouc, and 195 km (121 mi) east of Prague.

== History ==
The first written mention of Vícov is from 1355.

== Demographics ==
Historical population
Year	Pop.	±%
1869	462	—
1880	499	+8.0%
1890	527	+5.6%
1900	543	+3.0%
1910	561	+3.3%
1921	585	+4.3%
1930	636	+8.7%
1950	550	−13.5%
1961	617	+12.2%
1970	590	−4.4%
1980	577	−2.2%
1991	493	−14.6%
2001	468	−5.1%
2011	466	−0.4%
2021	532	+14.2%
Source: Censuses
