= Vrchoslavice =

- Municipality
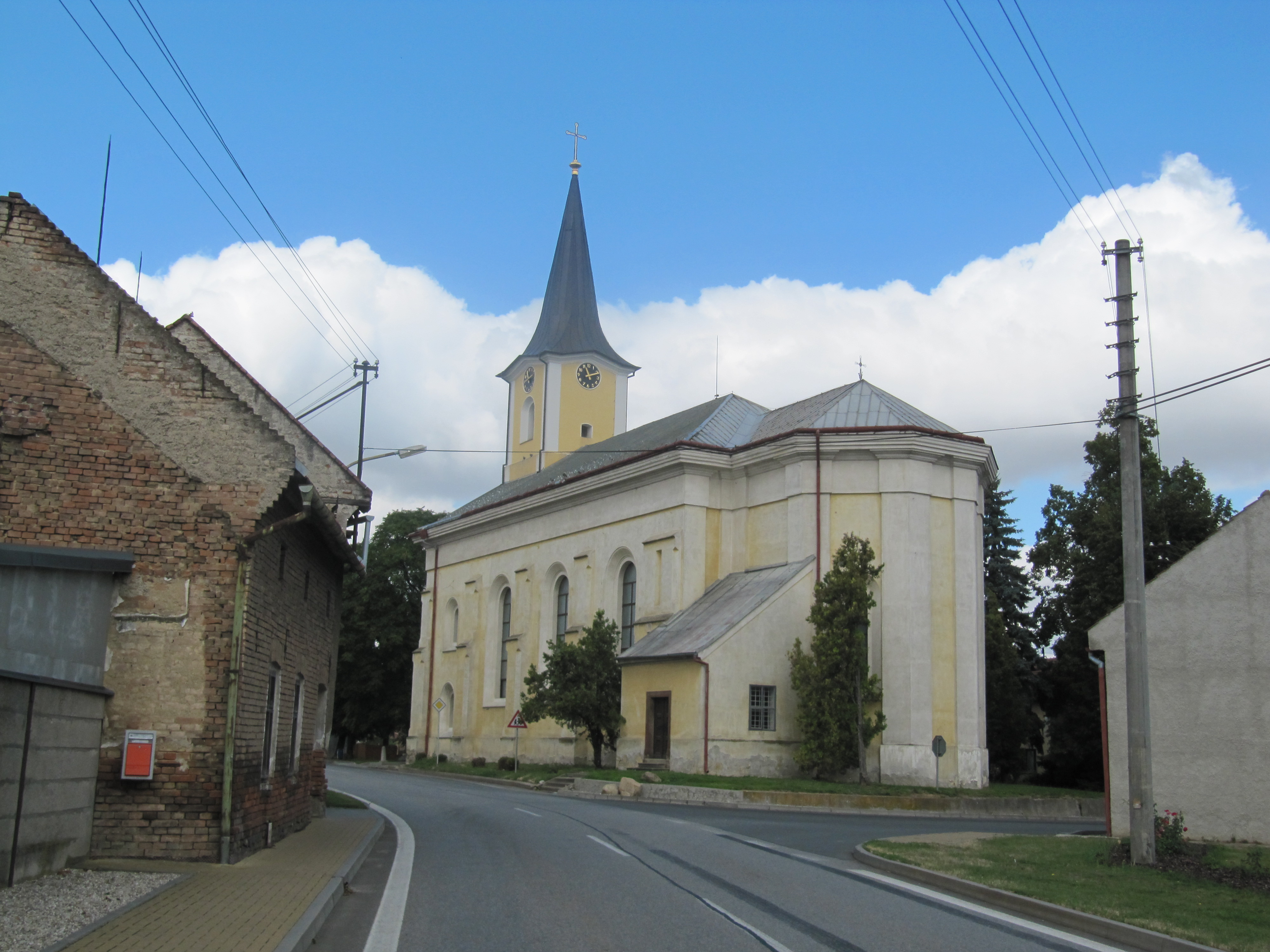
- Church of Saint Michael

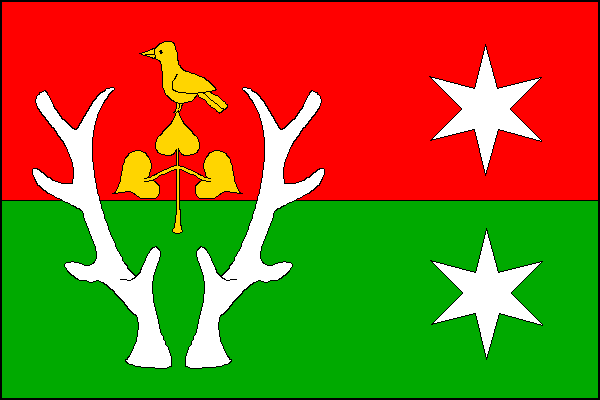
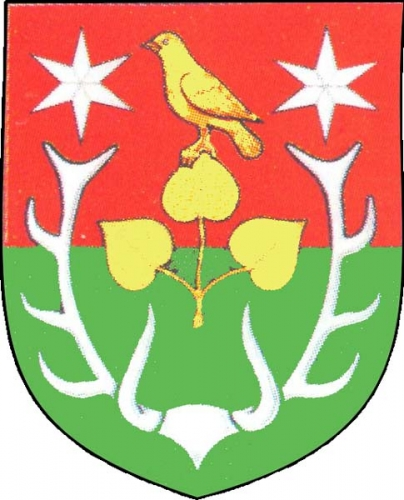
- Flag Coat of arms

- Location in the Czech Republic
- Coordinates: 49°19′59″N 17°13′6″E
- Country: Czech Republic
- Region: Olomouc
- District: Prostějov
- First mentioned: 1351

Area
  - Total: 3.36 km^{2} (1.30 sq mi)
- Elevation: 206 m (676 ft)

Population (2026-01-01)
  - Total: 607
  - Density: 181/km^{2} (468/sq mi)
- Time zone: UTC+1 (CET)
  - Summer (DST): UTC+2 (CEST)
- Postal code: 798 27
- Website: www.vrchoslavice.cz

Vrchoslavice is a municipality and village in Prostějov District in the Olomouc Region of the Czech Republic. It has about 600 inhabitants.

Vrchoslavice lies approximately 18 kilometres (11 mi) south-east of Prostějov, 30 km (19 mi) south of Olomouc, and 219 km (136 mi) south-east of Prague.

== Administrative division ==
Vrchoslavice consists of two municipal parts (in brackets population according to the 2021 census):

- Vrchoslavice (466)
- Dlouhá Ves (117)

== Demographics ==
Historical population
Year	Pop.	±%
1869	427	—
1880	490	+14.8%
1890	549	+12.0%
1900	555	+1.1%
1910	597	+7.6%
1921	588	−1.5%
1930	620	+5.4%
1950	555	−10.5%
1961	652	+17.5%
1970	618	−5.2%
1980	612	−1.0%
1991	605	−1.1%
2001	604	−0.2%
2011	592	−2.0%
2021	583	−1.5%
Source: Censuses
