= Hruška (Prostějov District) =

- Municipality
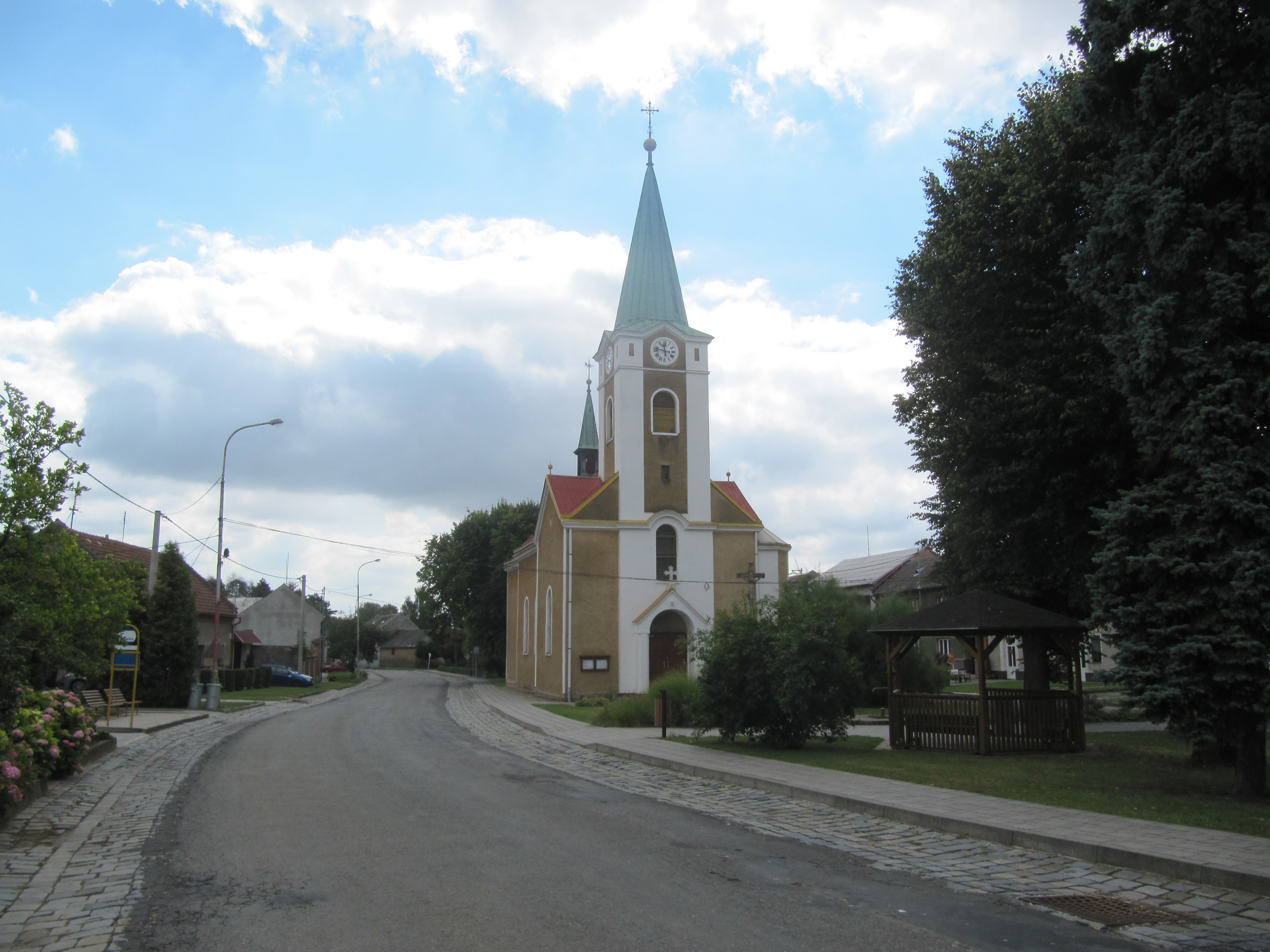
- Church of Saint John of Nepomuk

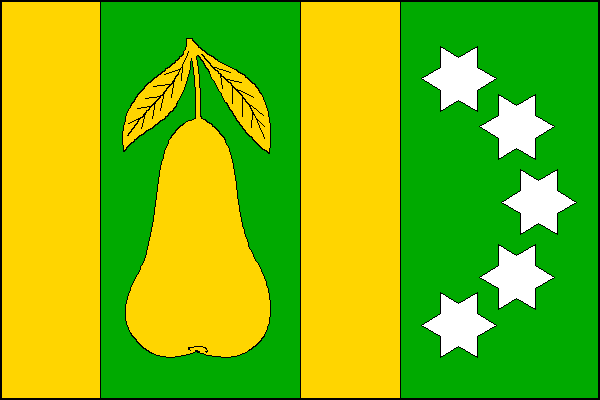
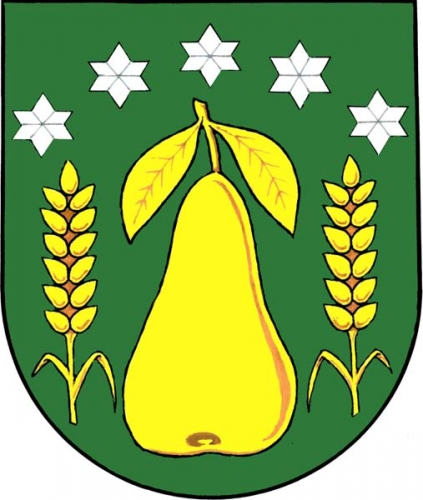
- Flag Coat of arms

- Location in the Czech Republic
- Coordinates: 49°21′32″N 17°13′36″E
- Country: Czech Republic
- Region: Olomouc
- District: Prostějov
- First mentioned: 1078

Area
  - Total: 4.48 km^{2} (1.73 sq mi)
- Elevation: 220 m (720 ft)

Population (2026-01-01)
  - Total: 249
  - Density: 55.6/km^{2} (144/sq mi)
- Time zone: UTC+1 (CET)
  - Summer (DST): UTC+2 (CEST)
- Postal code: 798 27
- Website: www.obechruska.cz

Hruška is a municipality and village in Prostějov District in the Olomouc Region of the Czech Republic. It has about 200 inhabitants.

Hruška lies approximately 16 kilometres (10 mi) south-east of Prostějov, 27 km (17 mi) south of Olomouc, and 218 km (135 mi) east of Prague.

== Demographics ==
Historical population
Year	Pop.	±%
1869	409	—
1880	439	+7.3%
1890	456	+3.9%
1900	521	+14.3%
1910	512	−1.7%
1921	489	−4.5%
1930	524	+7.2%
1950	414	−21.0%
1961	435	+5.1%
1970	368	−15.4%
1980	330	−10.3%
1991	278	−15.8%
2001	258	−7.2%
2011	223	−13.6%
2021	236	+5.8%
Source: Censuses
