= Mostkovice =

- Municipality
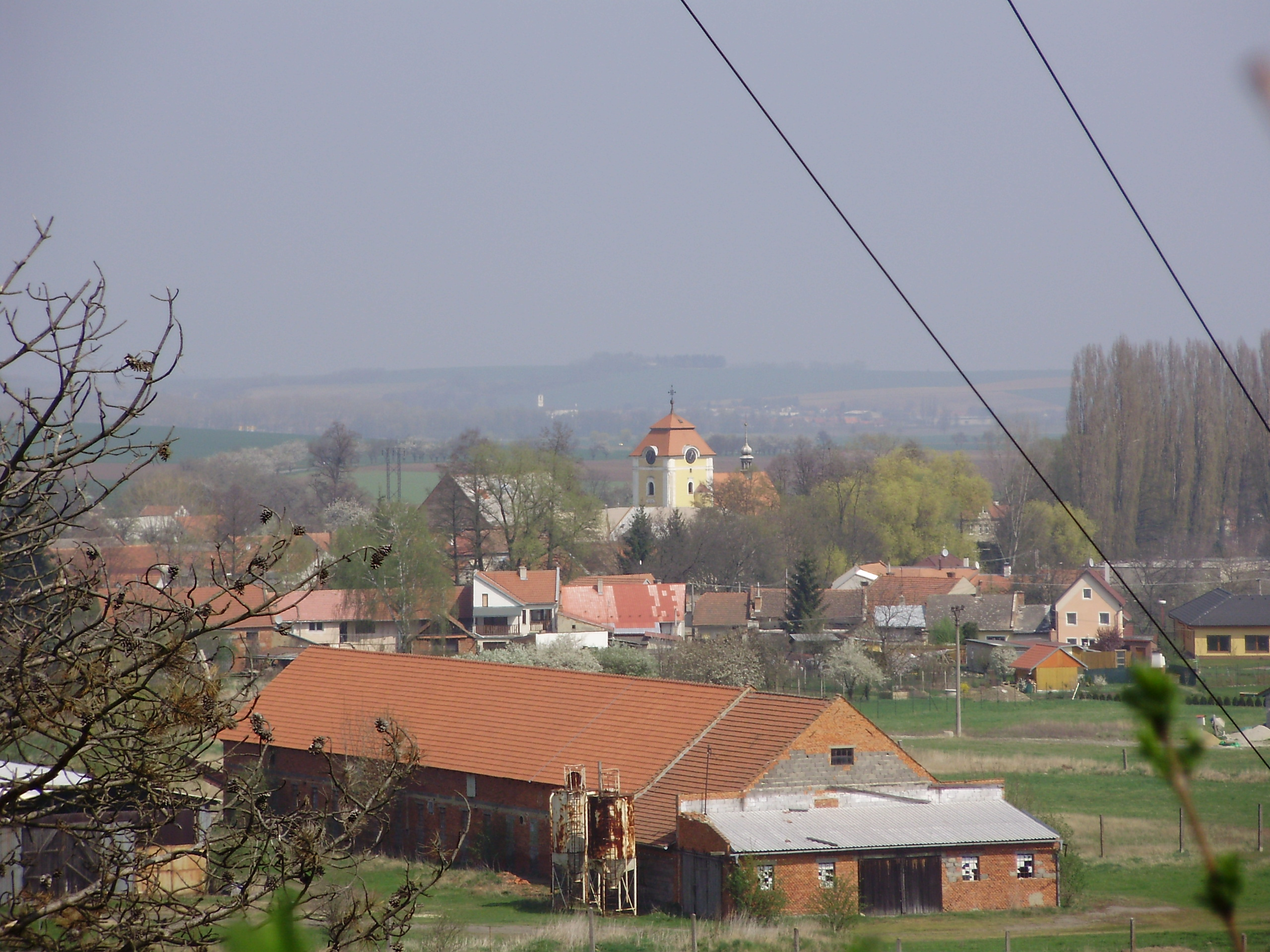
- View towards Mostkovice

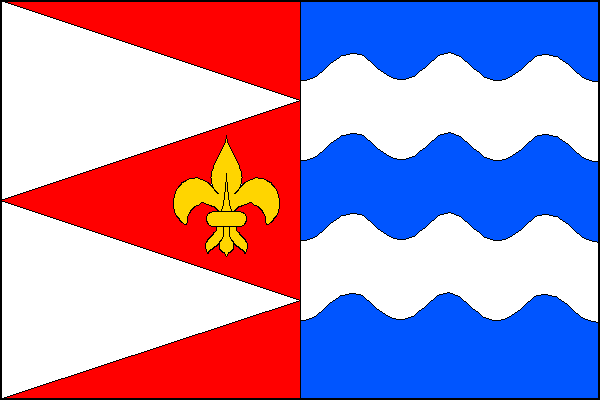
- Flag Coat of arms

- Location in the Czech Republic
- Coordinates: 49°28′20″N 17°3′8″E
- Country: Czech Republic
- Region: Olomouc
- District: Prostějov
- First mentioned: 1141

Area
  - Total: 8.34 km^{2} (3.22 sq mi)
- Elevation: 253 m (830 ft)

Population (2026-01-01)
  - Total: 1,659
  - Density: 199/km^{2} (515/sq mi)
- Time zone: UTC+1 (CET)
  - Summer (DST): UTC+2 (CEST)
- Postal code: 798 02
- Website: www.mostkovice.cz

Mostkovice is a municipality and village in Prostějov District in the Olomouc Region of the Czech Republic. It has about 1,700 inhabitants.

Mostkovice lies approximately 5 kilometres (3 mi) west of Prostějov, 21 km (13 mi) south-west of Olomouc, and 201 km (125 mi) east of Prague.

== Demographics ==
Historical population
Year	Pop.	±%
1869	885	—
1880	972	+9.8%
1890	1,055	+8.5%
1900	1,168	+10.7%
1910	1,290	+10.4%
1921	1,351	+4.7%
1930	1,448	+7.2%
1950	1,724	+19.1%
1961	1,511	−12.4%
1970	1,413	−6.5%
1980	1,415	+0.1%
1991	1,315	−7.1%
2001	1,294	−1.6%
2011	1,497	+15.7%
2021	1,571	+4.9%
Source: Censuses
