= Vřesovice (Prostějov District) =

- Municipality
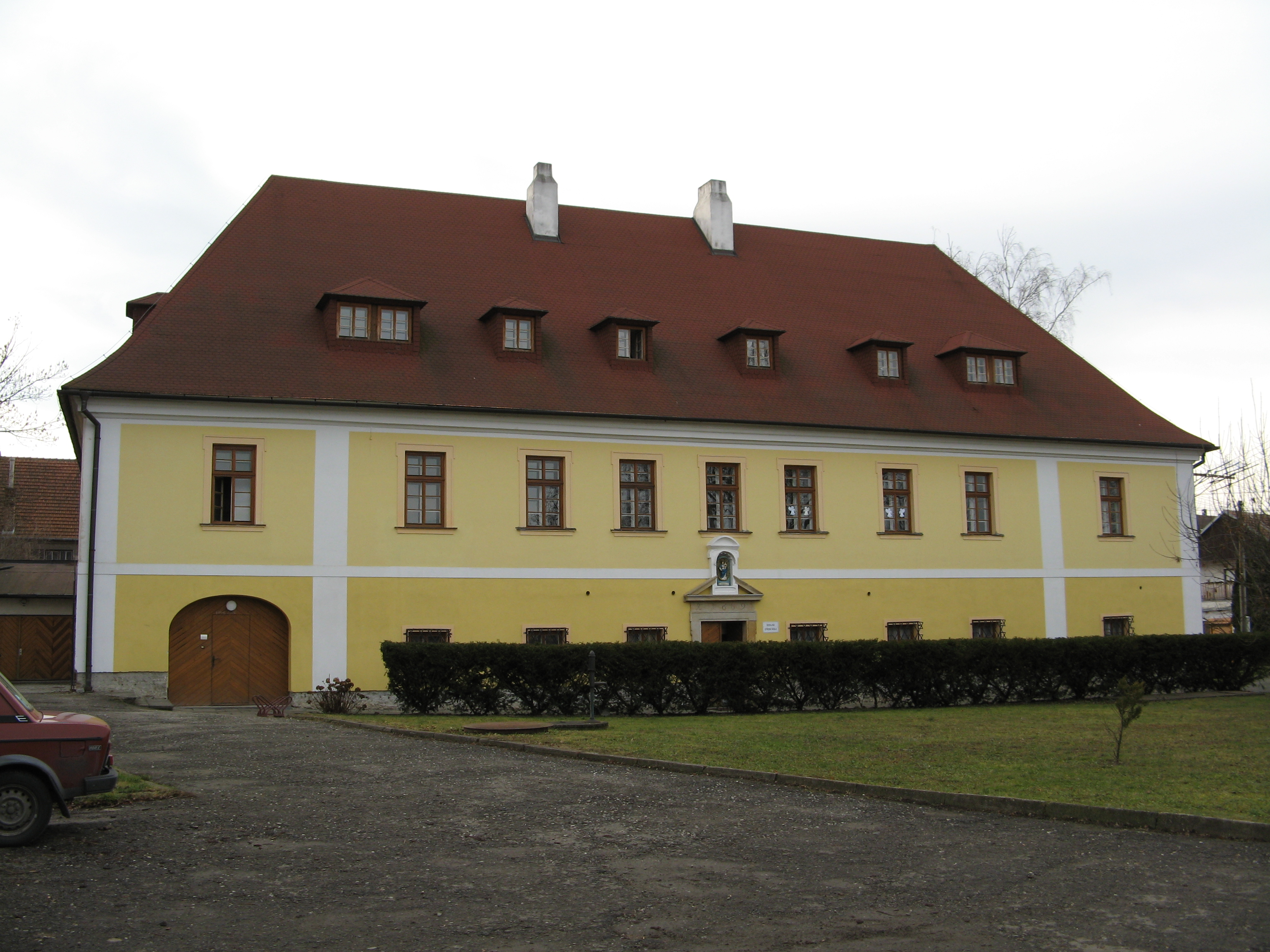
- Primary school

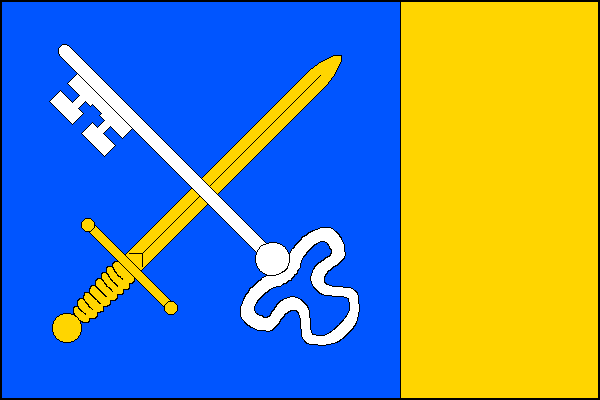
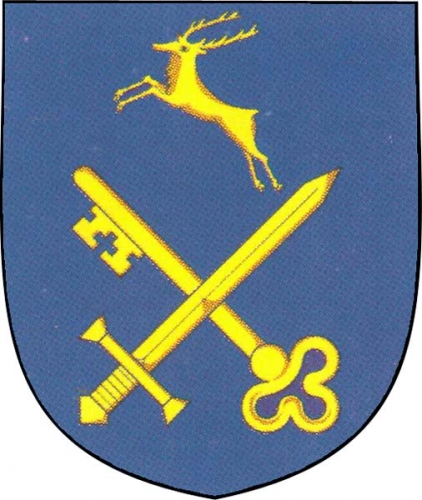
- Flag Coat of arms

- Location in the Czech Republic
- Coordinates: 49°24′6″N 17°8′20″E
- Country: Czech Republic
- Region: Olomouc
- District: Prostějov
- First mentioned: 1356

Area
  - Total: 6.20 km^{2} (2.39 sq mi)
- Elevation: 216 m (709 ft)

Population (2026-01-01)
  - Total: 580
  - Density: 94/km^{2} (240/sq mi)
- Time zone: UTC+1 (CET)
  - Summer (DST): UTC+2 (CEST)
- Postal code: 798 09
- Website: www.vresovice.cz

Vřesovice is a municipality and village in Prostějov District in the Olomouc Region of the Czech Republic. It has about 600 inhabitants.

Vřesovice lies approximately 9 kilometres (6 mi) south of Prostějov, 23 km (14 mi) south of Olomouc, and 211 km (131 mi) east of Prague.

== Demographics ==
Historical population
Year	Pop.	±%
1869	468	—
1880	556	+18.8%
1890	579	+4.1%
1900	549	−5.2%
1910	570	+3.8%
1921	574	+0.7%
1930	592	+3.1%
1950	538	−9.1%
1961	543	+0.9%
1970	496	−8.7%
1980	478	−3.6%
1991	400	−16.3%
2001	407	+1.8%
2011	469	+15.2%
2021	540	+15.1%
Source: Censuses
