= Danuta Gruszka =

Polish chess player

Personal information
- Born: 29 March 1970 (age 56)

Chess career
- Country: Poland
- Title: Woman FIDE Master (1990)
- Peak rating: 2190 (July 1989)

Danuta Gruszka (née Kłusek; born 29 March 1970) is a Polish chess Woman FIDE Master (WFM) (1990).

== Biography ==
Danuta Gruszka is a two-time Polish Youth Chess Championship winner: in 1985 in Sobótka she won in the girl's U17 age group, and in 1988 in Wągrowiec - in the girl's U19 age group. In 1987, she won a bronze medal in Miętne also in the girl's U19 age group. Twice in row she appeared in the finals of Polish Women's Chess Championship (1989, 1990). She achieved the best result in 1989 in Poznań, when won bronze medal. In 1988, she won international chess tournaments in Tübingen and Grudziądz. A year later, she represented Poland at the Women's World Chess Championship zonal tournament in Brno, taking 8th place (tournament won Margarita Voiska). Also in 1989 in Tunja she ranked 12th in World Junior Chess Championship (tournament won Ketino Kachiani) and ranked 5th in Dębica in European Junior Chess Championship (tournament won Svetlana Matveeva). In 1990, she won in Dębica the gold medal in Polish Rapid Chess Championship, and in Gdynia - the bronze medal in the Polish Blitz Chess Championship.

Danuta Gruszka reached the highest rating in her career on July 1, 1989, with a score of 2190 points, she was ranked 8th among Polish female chess players. Since 1999, she has not played in tournaments classified by International Chess Federation.
