= Ohrozim =

- Municipality
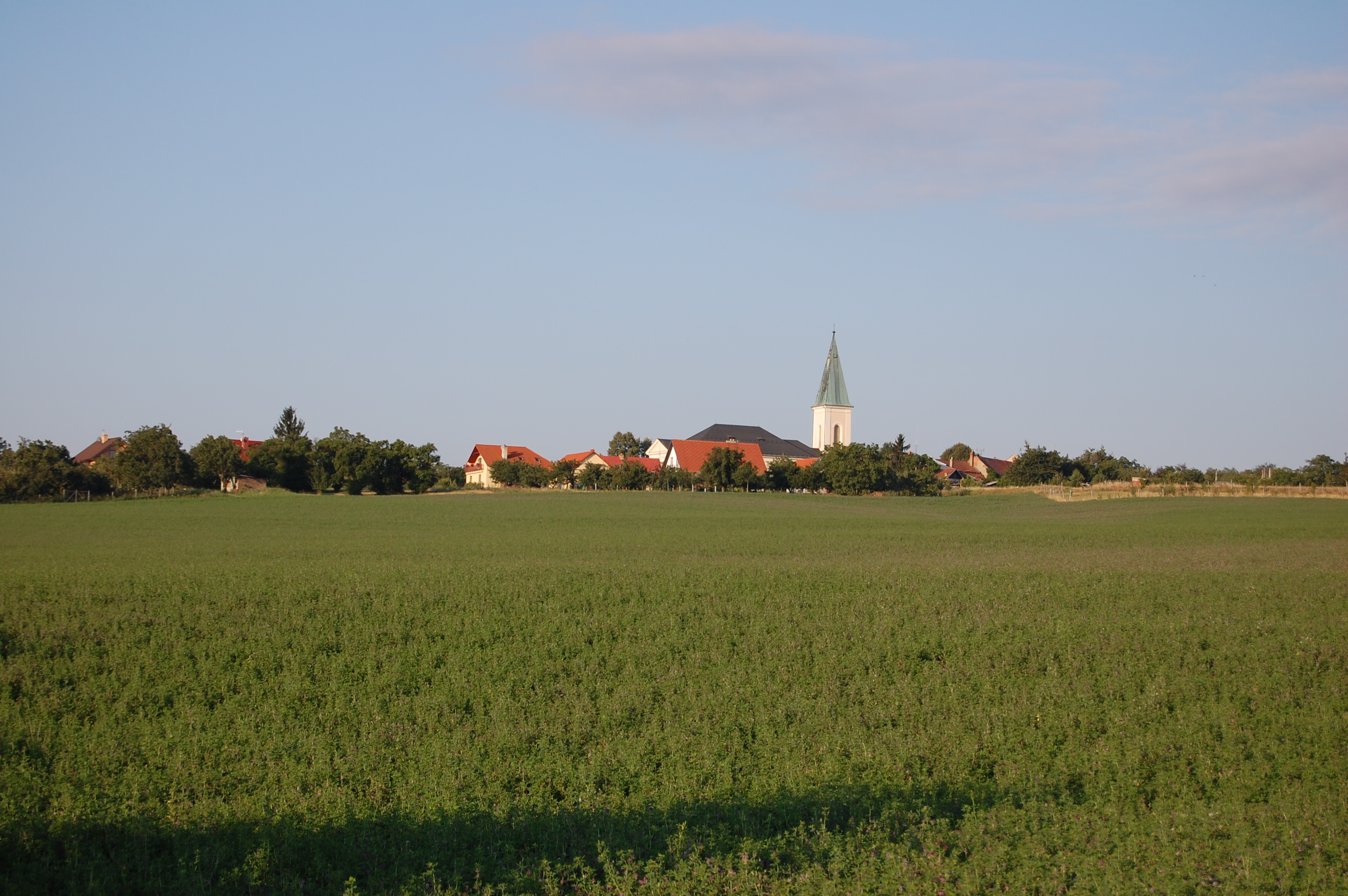
- General view

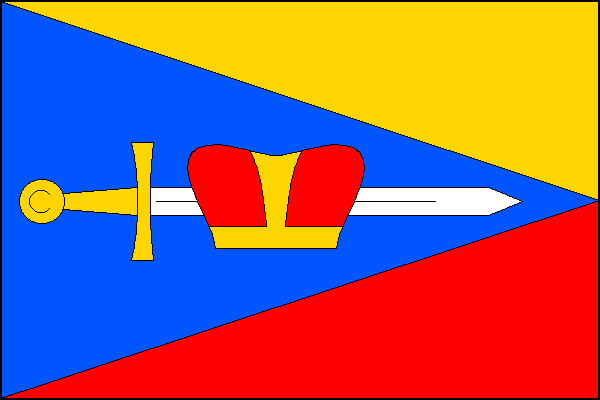
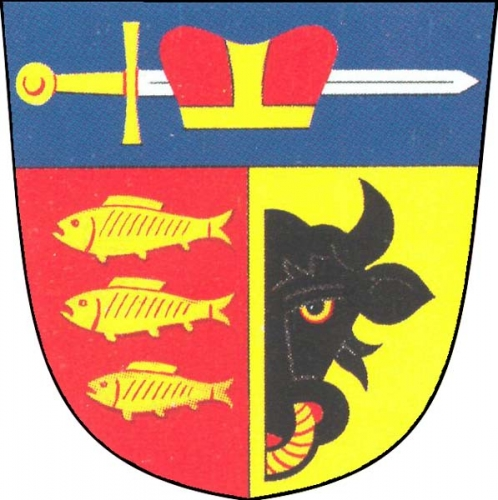
- Flag Coat of arms

- Location in the Czech Republic
- Coordinates: 49°29′11″N 17°1′14″E
- Country: Czech Republic
- Region: Olomouc
- District: Prostějov
- First mentioned: 1141

Area
  - Total: 6.28 km^{2} (2.42 sq mi)
- Elevation: 315 m (1,033 ft)

Population (2026-01-01)
  - Total: 475
  - Density: 75.6/km^{2} (196/sq mi)
- Time zone: UTC+1 (CET)
  - Summer (DST): UTC+2 (CEST)
- Postal code: 798 03
- Website: www.ohrozim.cz

Ohrozim is a municipality and village in Prostějov District in the Olomouc Region of the Czech Republic. It has about 500 inhabitants.

Ohrozim lies approximately 7 kilometres (4 mi) west of Prostějov, 21 km (13 mi) south-west of Olomouc, and 199 km (124 mi) east of Prague.

== Demographics ==
Historical population
Year	Pop.	±%
1869	582	—
1880	581	−0.2%
1890	638	+9.8%
1900	612	−4.1%
1910	657	+7.4%
1921	655	−0.3%
1930	672	+2.6%
1950	618	−8.0%
1961	633	+2.4%
1970	550	−13.1%
1980	504	−8.4%
1991	424	−15.9%
2001	424	+0.0%
2011	472	+11.3%
2021	442	−6.4%
Source: Censuses
