= Tištín =

- Market town
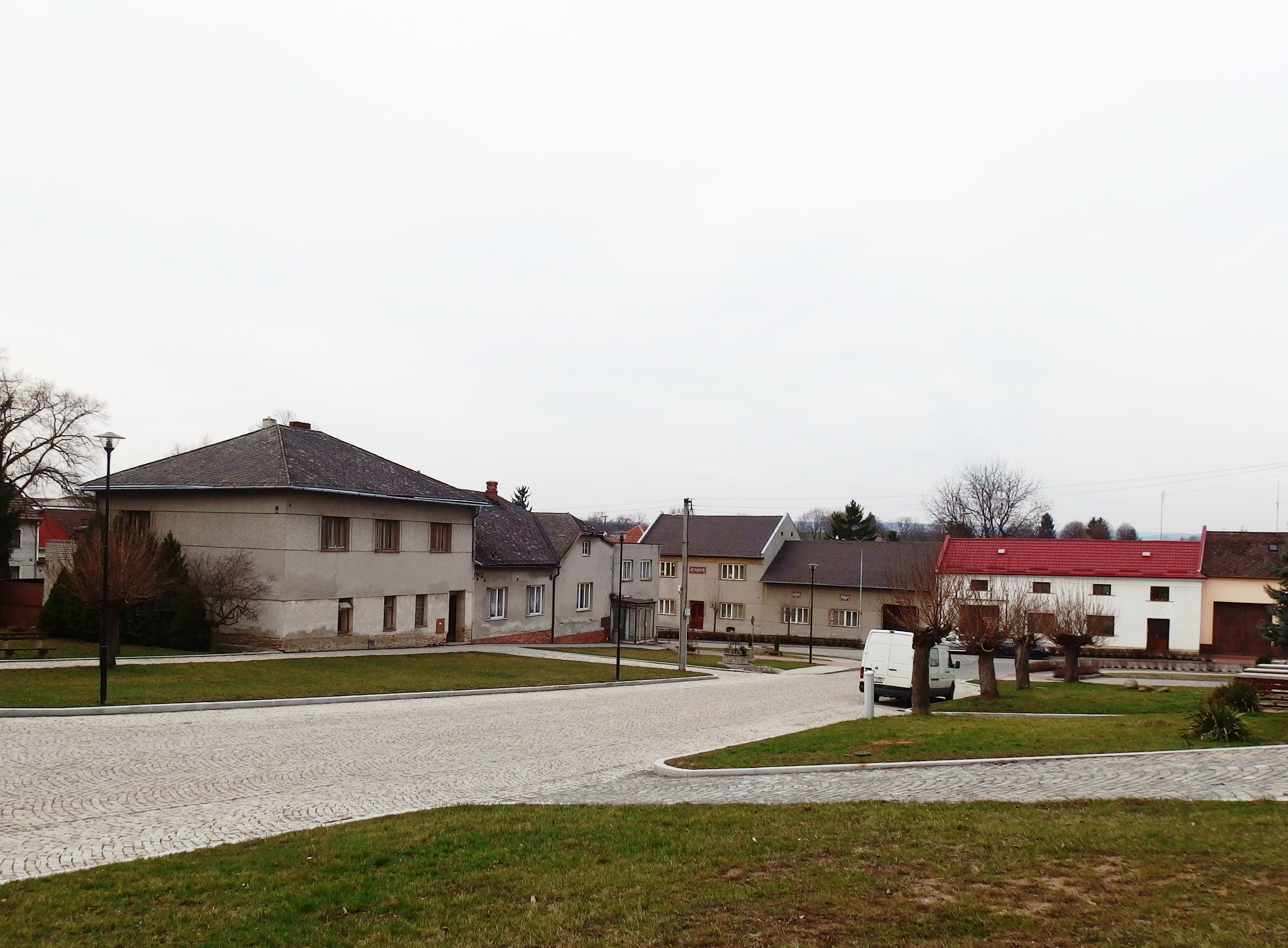
- Centre of Tištín

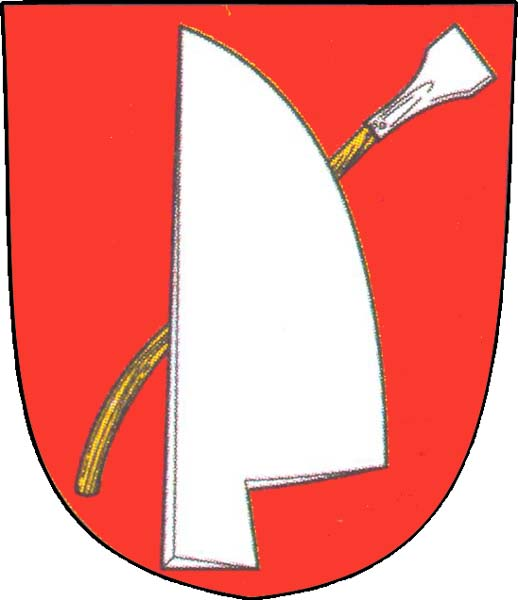
- Flag Coat of arms

- Location in the Czech Republic
- Coordinates: 49°18′25″N 17°9′56″E
- Country: Czech Republic
- Region: Olomouc
- District: Prostějov
- First mentioned: 1327

Area
  - Total: 8.25 km^{2} (3.19 sq mi)
- Elevation: 220 m (720 ft)

Population (2026-01-01)
  - Total: 461
  - Density: 55.9/km^{2} (145/sq mi)
- Time zone: UTC+1 (CET)
  - Summer (DST): UTC+2 (CEST)
- Postal code: 798 29
- Website: www.tistin.cz

Tištín (Czech pronunciation: [ˈcɪʃciːn]) is a market town in Prostějov District in the Olomouc Region of the Czech Republic. It has about 500 inhabitants.

== Etymology ==
The oldest written form of the name is Ciesczyn. The name was derived from the personal name Částa and by gradual distortion it evolved into Tištín.

== Geography ==
Tištín is located about 18 kilometres (11 mi) south of Prostějov and 31 km (19 mi) south of Olomouc. It lies in an agricultural landscape in the Litenčice Hills. The Tištinka Stream flows through the market town.

== History ==
The first written mention of Tištín is in a donation deed of King John of Bohemia from 1327. It 1390, Tištín was already referred to as a market town. During the Thirty Years' War, Tištín was badly damaged and depopulated. It became again a village, but in 1676, it was again promoted to a market town.

== Demographics ==
Historical population

Year	Pop.	±%
1869	712	—
1880	753	+5.8%
1890	734	−2.5%
1900	721	−1.8%
1910	798	+10.7%

Year	Pop.	±%
1921	876	+9.8%
1930	879	+0.3%
1950	737	−16.2%
1961	780	+5.8%
1970	645	−17.3%

Year	Pop.	±%
1980	606	−6.0%
1991	535	−11.7%
2001	522	−2.4%
2011	492	−5.7%
2021	434	−11.8%

Source: Censuses

== Transport ==
The D1 motorway from Brno to Ostrava runs along the northern municipal border.

== Sights ==
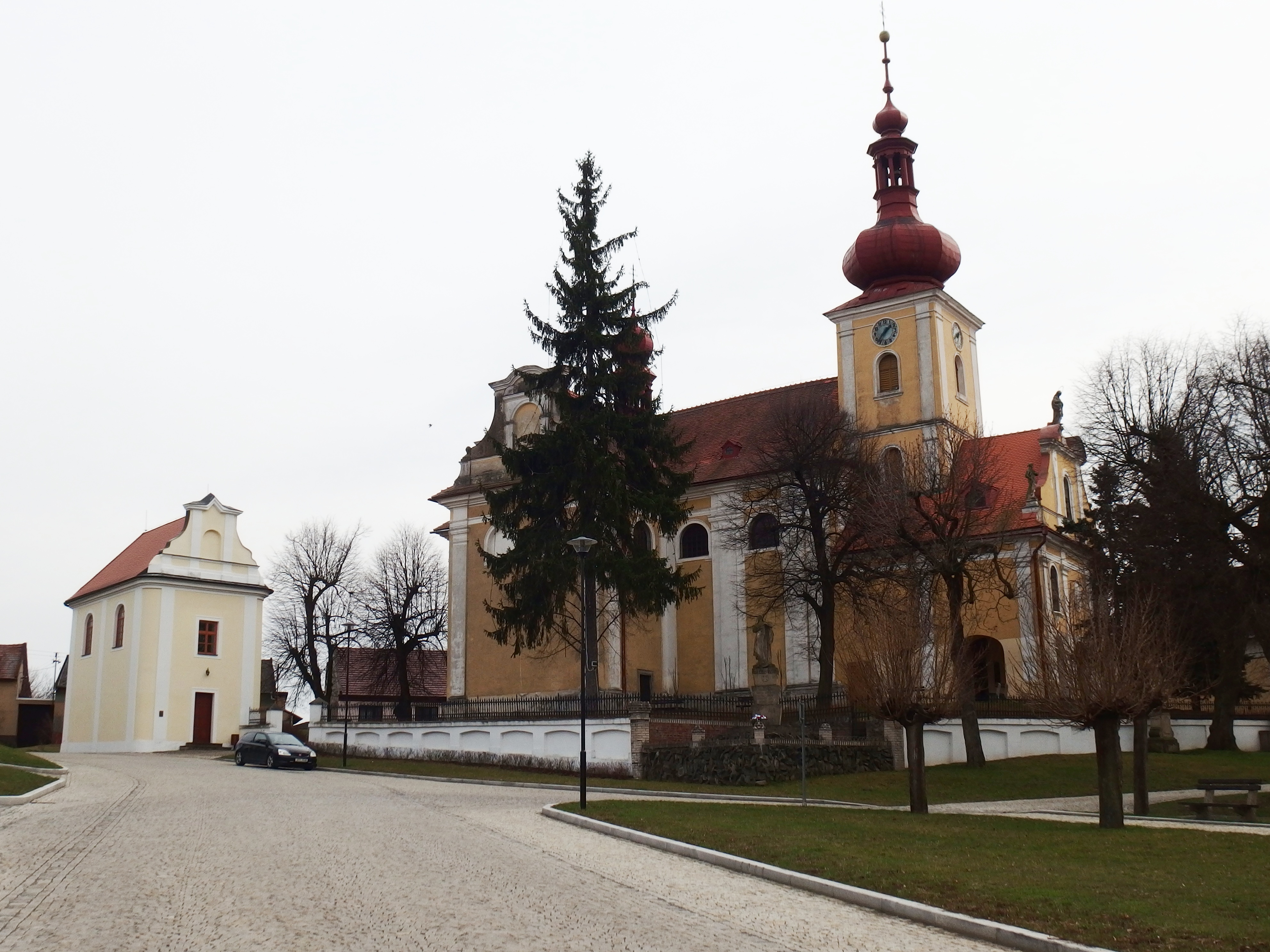
Church of Saints Peter and Paul

The main landmark of Tištín is the Church of Saints Peter and Paul. It was built in the Baroque style in the 18th century. Next to the church is the former chapel of Saint Joseph.
