= Dubany =

- Municipality
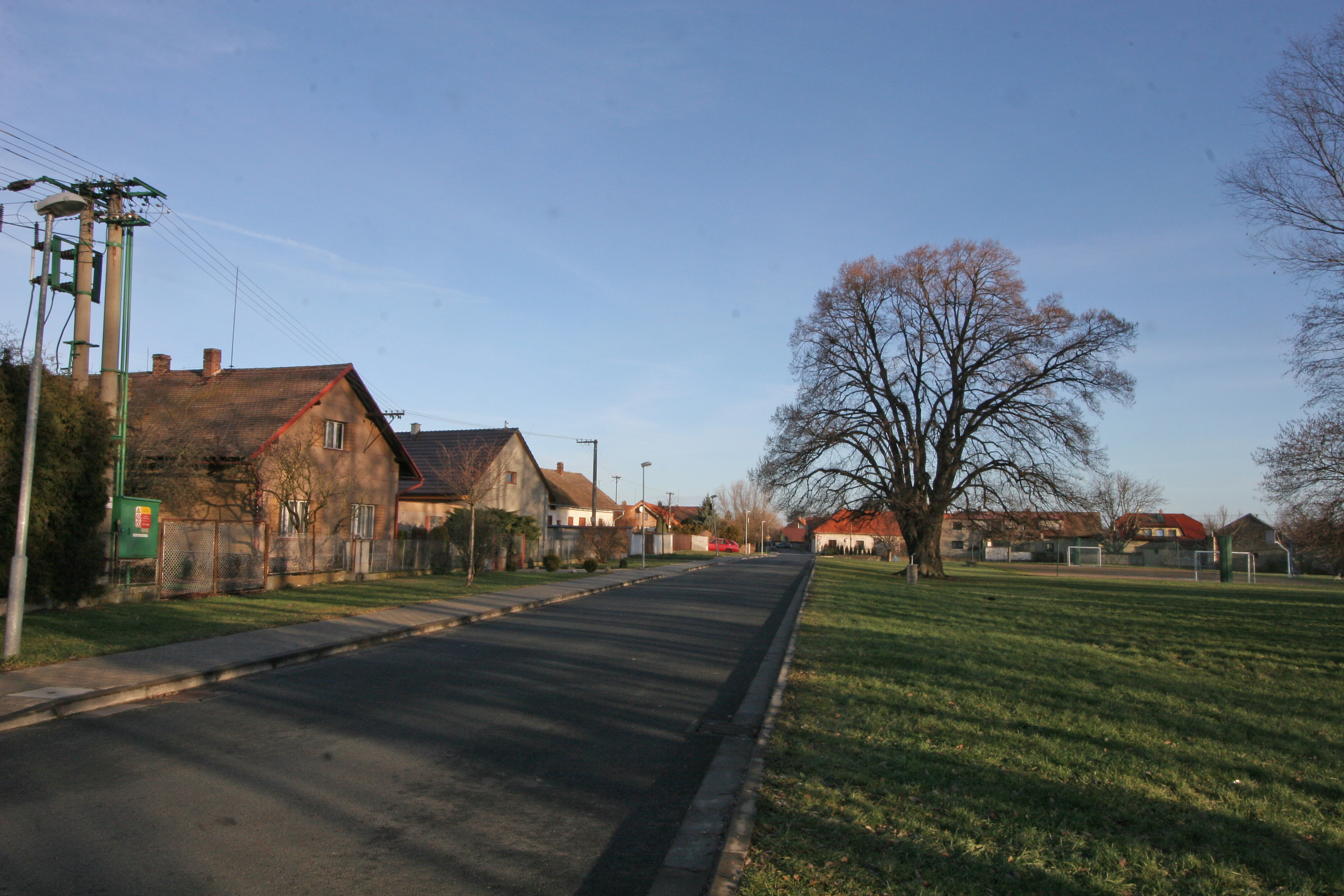
- Centre of Dubany

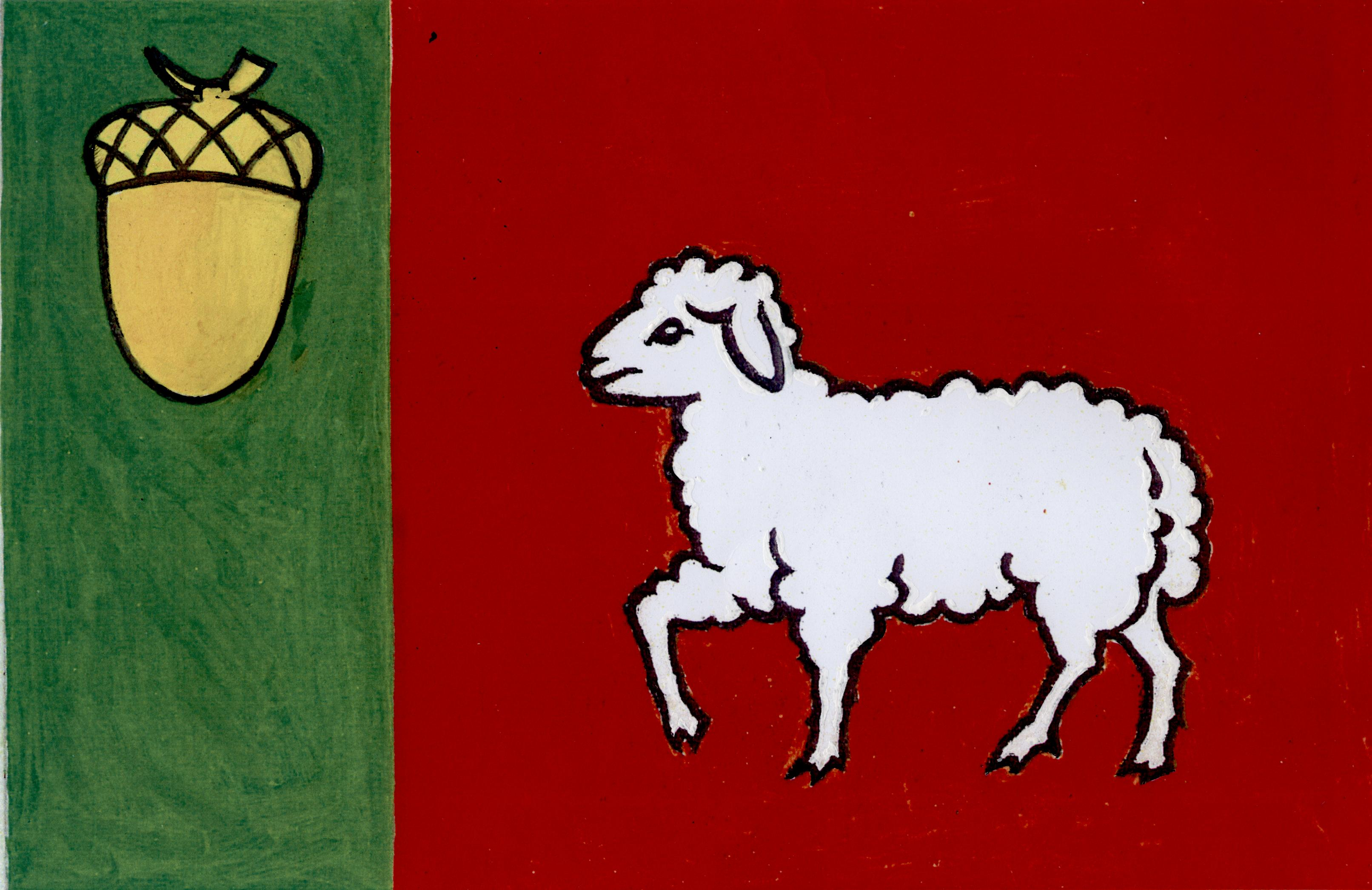
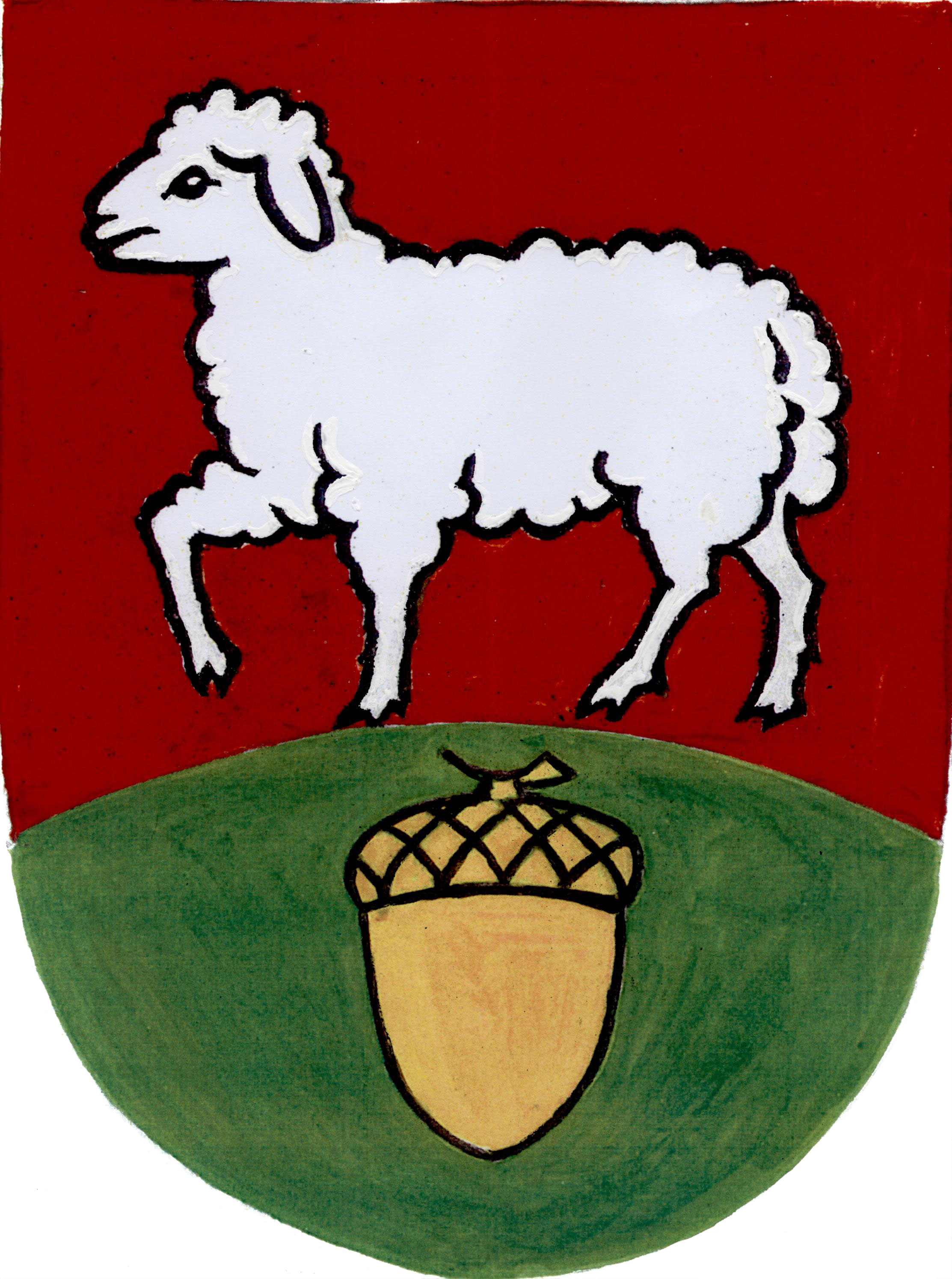
- Flag Coat of arms

- Location in the Czech Republic
- Coordinates: 49°59′35″N 15°43′30″E
- Country: Czech Republic
- Region: Pardubice
- District: Pardubice
- First mentioned: 1261

Area
  - Total: 1.73 km^{2} (0.67 sq mi)
- Elevation: 238 m (781 ft)

Population (2026-01-01)
  - Total: 349
  - Density: 202/km^{2} (522/sq mi)
- Time zone: UTC+1 (CET)
  - Summer (DST): UTC+2 (CEST)
- Postal code: 530 02
- Website: www.dubany.cz

Dubany is a municipality and village in Pardubice District in the Pardubice Region of the Czech Republic. It has about 300 inhabitants.

== Demographics ==
Historical population
Year	Pop.	±%
1869	225	—
1880	221	−1.8%
1890	240	+8.6%
1900	259	+7.9%
1910	330	+27.4%
1921	346	+4.8%
1930	358	+3.5%
1950	301	−15.9%
1961	248	−17.6%
1970	223	−10.1%
1980	187	−16.1%
1991	170	−9.1%
2001	183	+7.6%
2011	245	+33.9%
2021	318	+29.8%
Source: Censuses
