= Myslejovice =

- Municipality
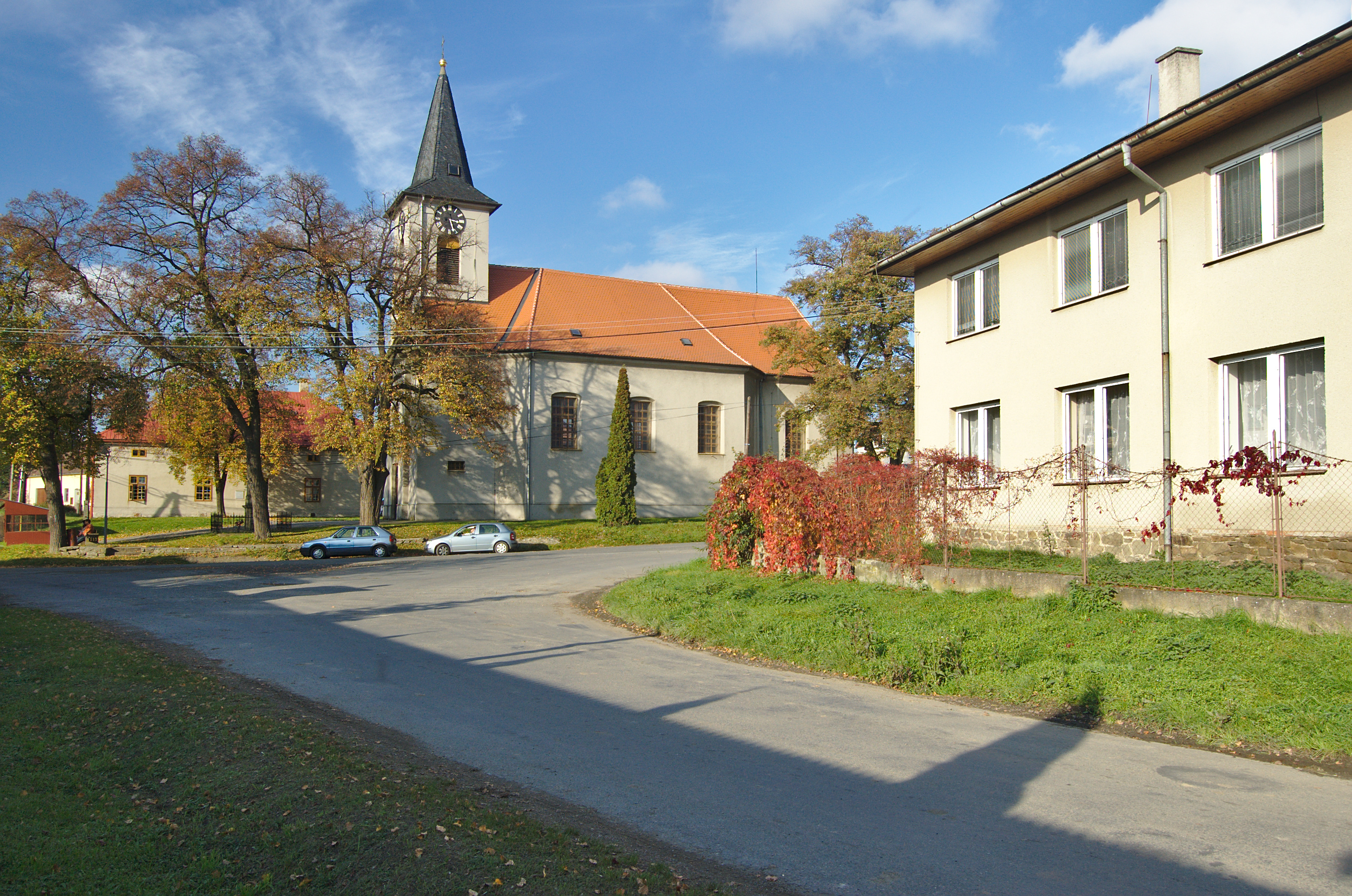
- Church of the Assumption of the Virgin Mary

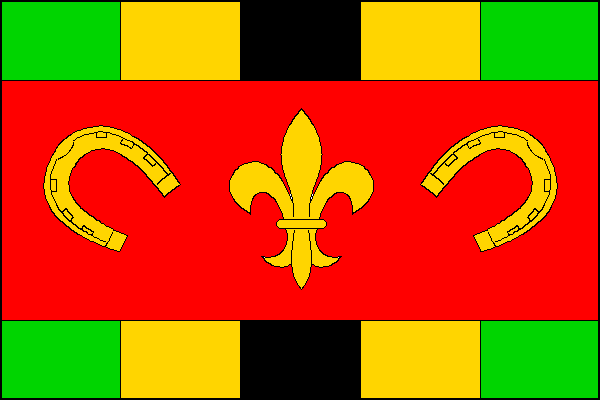
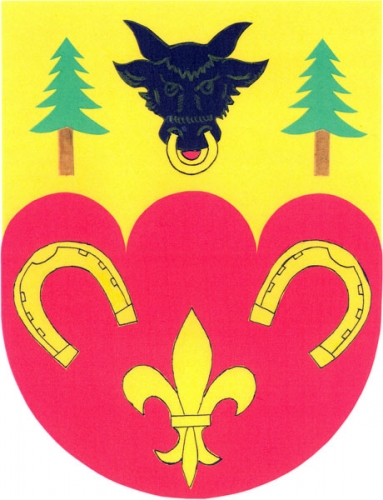
- Flag Coat of arms

- Location in the Czech Republic
- Coordinates: 49°24′26″N 17°1′4″E
- Country: Czech Republic
- Region: Olomouc
- District: Prostějov
- First mentioned: 1267

Area
  - Total: 6.94 km^{2} (2.68 sq mi)
- Elevation: 353 m (1,158 ft)

Population (2026-01-01)
  - Total: 677
  - Density: 97.6/km^{2} (253/sq mi)
- Time zone: UTC+1 (CET)
  - Summer (DST): UTC+2 (CEST)
- Postal code: 798 05
- Website: www.myslejovice.cz

Myslejovice is a municipality and village in Prostějov District in the Olomouc Region of the Czech Republic. It has about 700 inhabitants.

== Administrative division ==
Myslejovice consists of three municipal parts (in brackets population according to the 2021 census):

- Myslejovice (355)
- Kobylničky (103)
- Křenůvky (167)

== History ==
The first written mention of Myslejovice is from 1267.

== Demographics ==
Historical population
Year	Pop.	±%
1869	843	—
1880	899	+6.6%
1890	919	+2.2%
1900	976	+6.2%
1910	993	+1.7%
1921	1,008	+1.5%
1930	1,062	+5.4%
1950	1,010	−4.9%
1961	946	−6.3%
1970	878	−7.2%
1980	767	−12.6%
1991	656	−14.5%
2001	632	−3.7%
2011	663	+4.9%
2021	625	−5.7%
Source: Censuses
