= Klenovice na Hané =

- Municipality
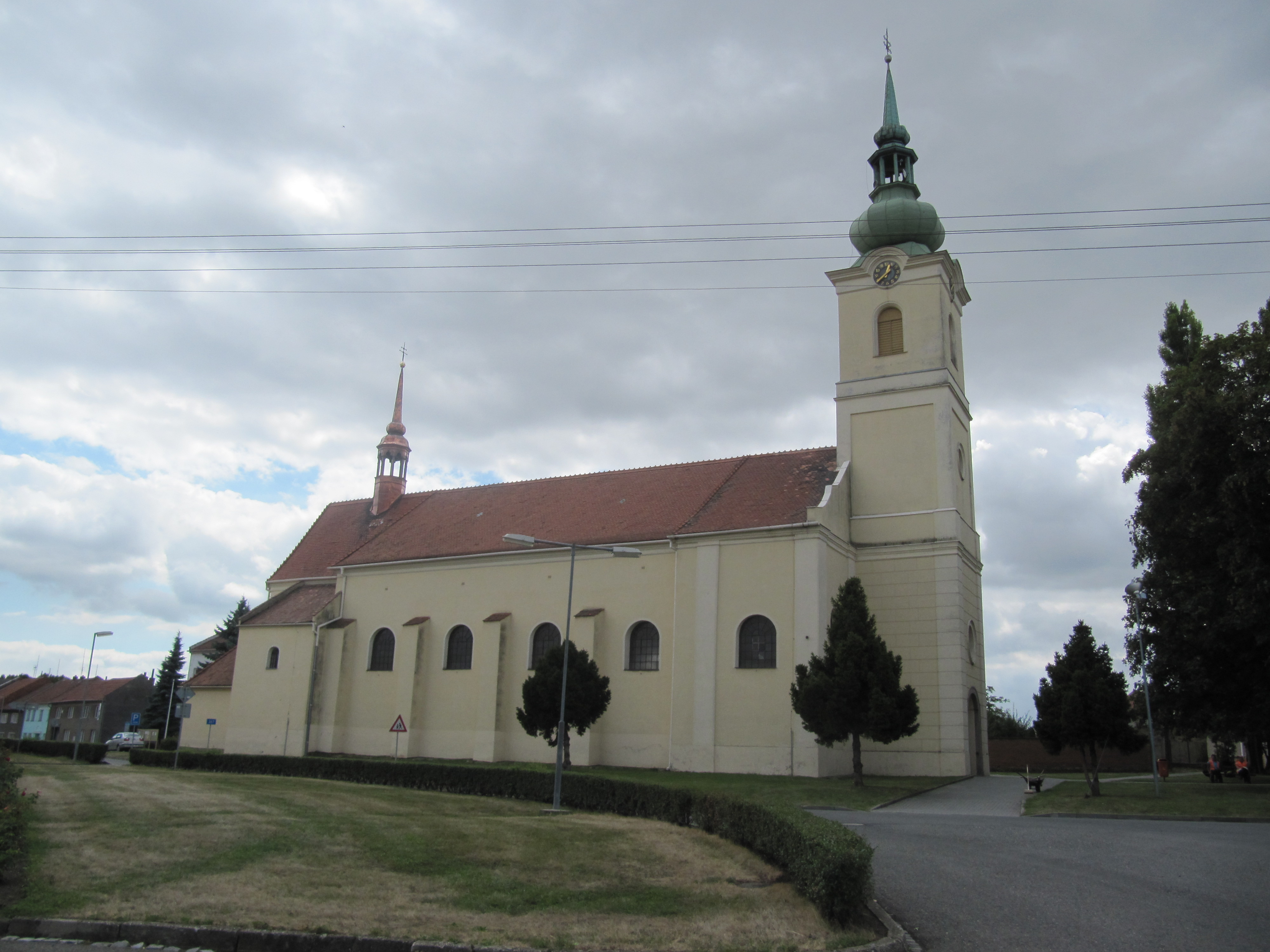
- Church of Saint Bartholomew

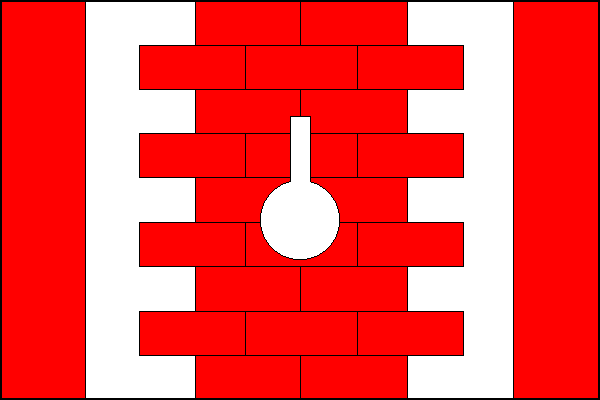
- Flag Coat of arms

- Location in the Czech Republic
- Coordinates: 49°24′11″N 17°12′40″E
- Country: Czech Republic
- Region: Olomouc
- District: Prostějov
- First mentioned: 1309

Area
  - Total: 8.02 km^{2} (3.10 sq mi)
- Elevation: 227 m (745 ft)

Population (2026-01-01)
  - Total: 813
  - Density: 101/km^{2} (263/sq mi)
- Time zone: UTC+1 (CET)
  - Summer (DST): UTC+2 (CEST)
- Postal code: 798 23
- Website: www.klenovicenahane.cz

Klenovice na Hané is a municipality and village in Prostějov District in the Olomouc Region of the Czech Republic. It has about 800 inhabitants.

Klenovice na Hané lies approximately 11 kilometres (7 mi) south-east of Prostějov, 22 km (14 mi) south of Olomouc, and 215 km (134 mi) east of Prague.

== Demographics ==
Historical population
Year	Pop.	±%
1869	632	—
1880	693	+9.7%
1890	729	+5.2%
1900	799	+9.6%
1910	951	+19.0%
1921	1,019	+7.2%
1930	998	−2.1%
1950	818	−18.0%
1961	853	+4.3%
1970	843	−1.2%
1980	849	+0.7%
1991	820	−3.4%
2001	795	−3.0%
2011	791	−0.5%
2021	814	+2.9%
Source: Censuses
