= Rozstání (Prostějov District) =

- Municipality
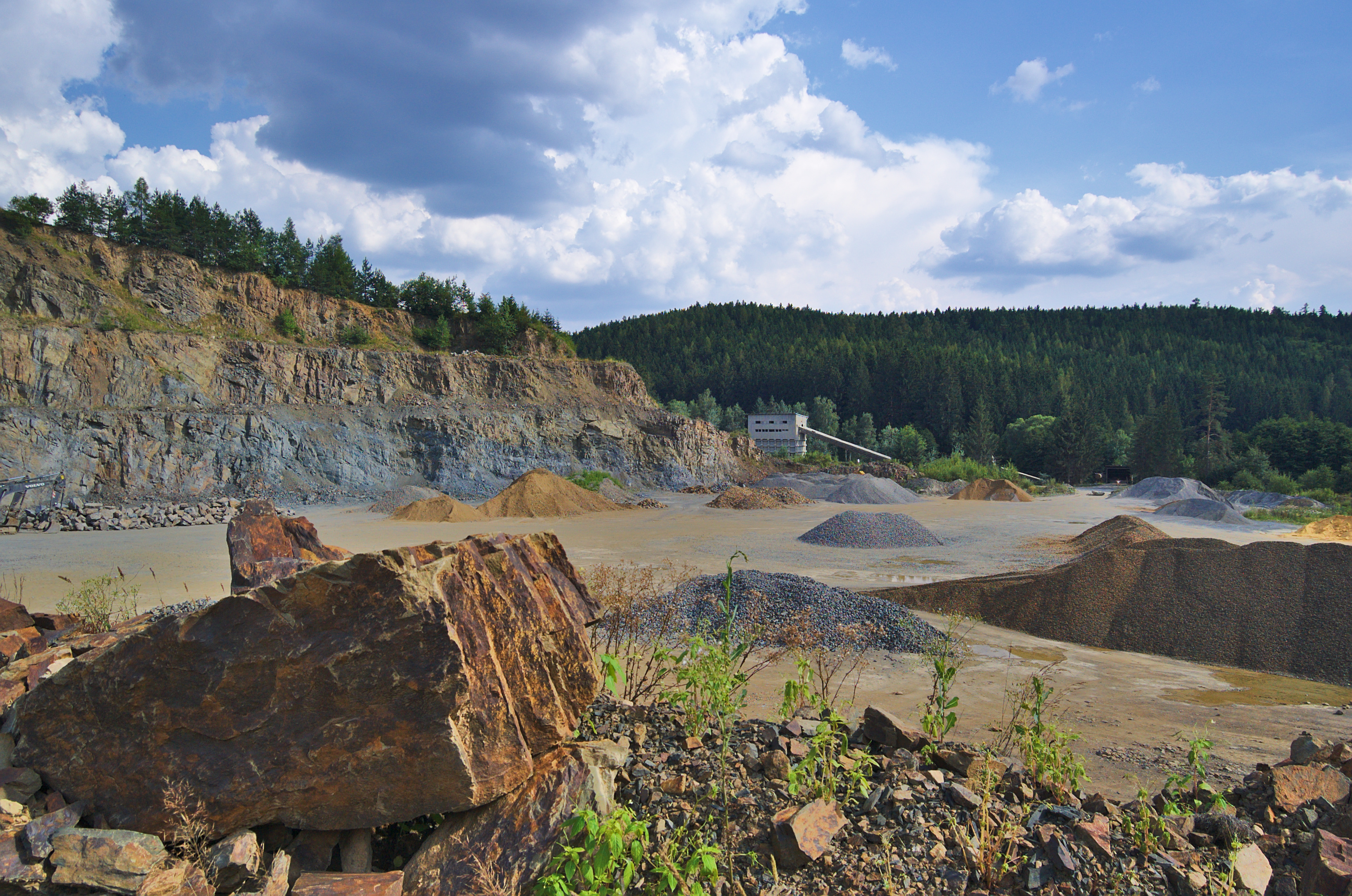
- Quarry in Baldovec

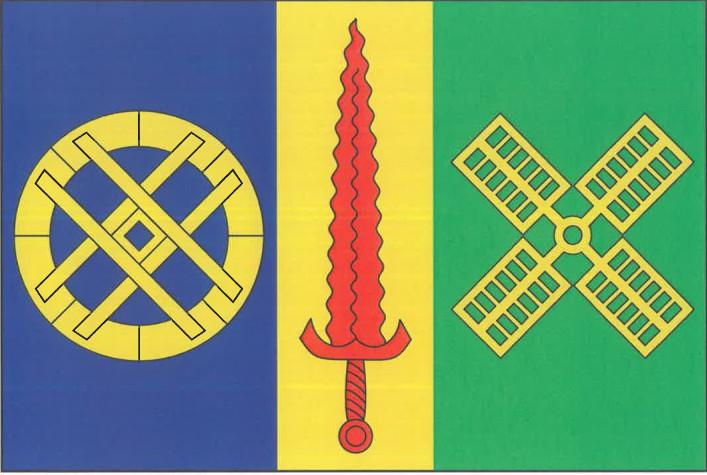
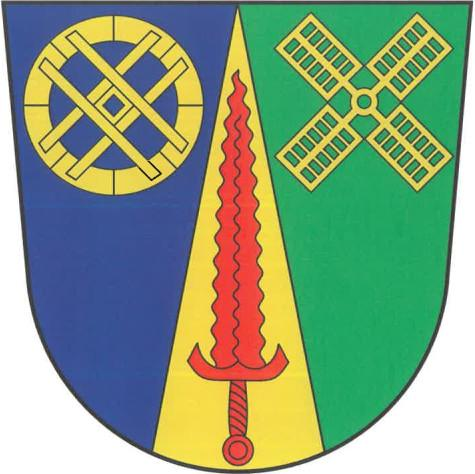
- Flag Coat of arms

- Location in the Czech Republic
- Coordinates: 49°23′52″N 16°50′25″E
- Country: Czech Republic
- Region: Olomouc
- District: Prostějov
- First mentioned: 1358

Area
  - Total: 16.52 km^{2} (6.38 sq mi)
- Elevation: 545 m (1,788 ft)

Population (2026-01-01)
  - Total: 633
  - Density: 38.3/km^{2} (99.2/sq mi)
- Time zone: UTC+1 (CET)
  - Summer (DST): UTC+2 (CEST)
- Postal codes: 798 61, 798 62
- Website: www.rozstani.eu

Rozstání is a municipality and village in Prostějov District in the Olomouc Region of the Czech Republic. It has about 600 inhabitants.

Rozstání lies approximately 21 kilometres (13 mi) south-west of Prostějov, 37 km (23 mi) south-west of Olomouc, and 191 km (119 mi) south-east of Prague.

== Administrative division ==
Rozstání consists of two municipal parts (in brackets population according to the 2021 census):

- Rozstání (534)
- Baldovec (104)

== Demographics ==
Historical population
Year	Pop.	±%
1869	1,144	—
1880	1,212	+5.9%
1890	1,268	+4.6%
1900	1,327	+4.7%
1910	1,350	+1.7%
1921	1,334	−1.2%
1930	1,283	−3.8%
1950	1,089	−15.1%
1961	1,175	+7.9%
1970	1,047	−10.9%
1980	880	−16.0%
1991	752	−14.5%
2001	685	−8.9%
2011	643	−6.1%
2021	638	−0.8%
Source: Censuses
