= Gruszka =

Gruszka (Polish pronunciation: [ˈɡruʂka]) is a Polish place name. It may refer to:

- Gruszka, Lublin Voivodeship (east Poland)
- Gruszka, Kielce County in Świętokrzyskie Voivodeship (south-central Poland)
- Gruszka, Końskie County in Świętokrzyskie Voivodeship (south-central Poland)
- Gruszka, Warmian-Masurian Voivodeship (north Poland)
