= Pavlovice u Kojetína =

- Municipality
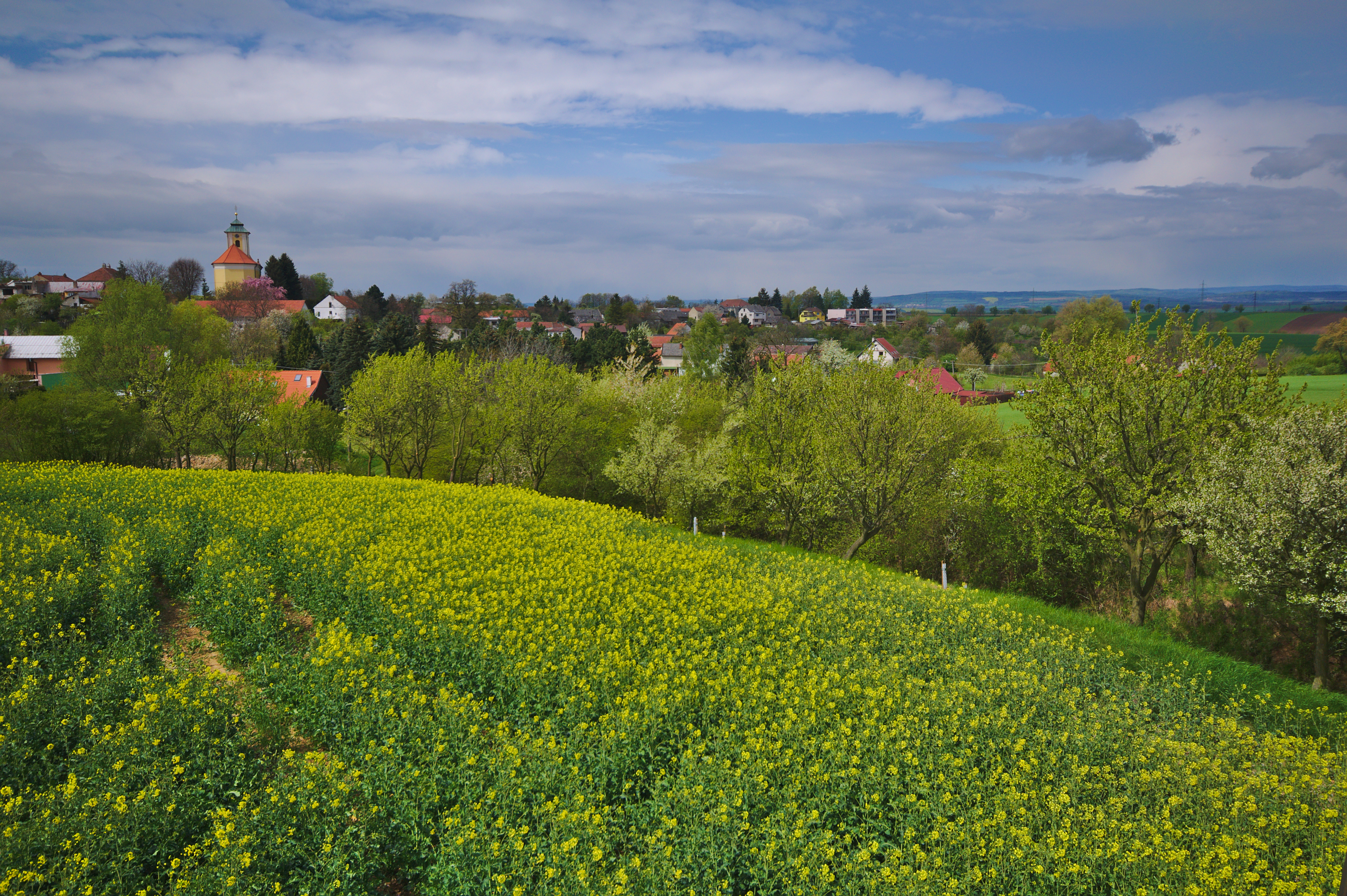
- View from the east

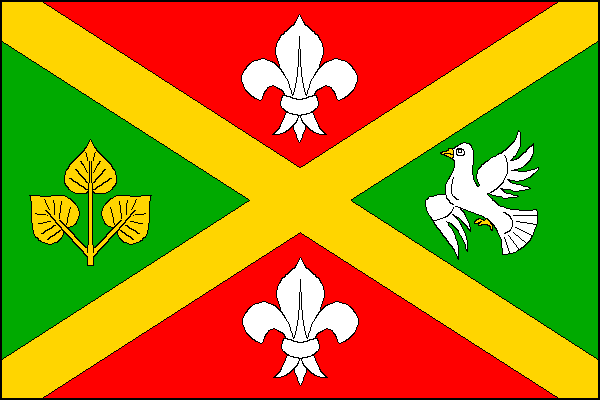
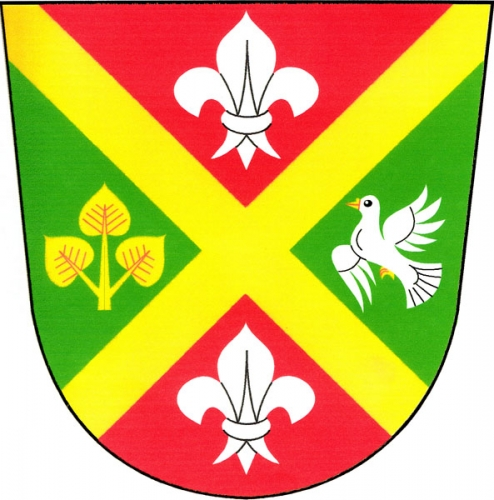
- Flag Coat of arms

- Location in the Czech Republic
- Coordinates: 49°18′7″N 17°12′45″E
- Country: Czech Republic
- Region: Olomouc
- District: Prostějov
- First mentioned: 1329

Area
  - Total: 5.20 km^{2} (2.01 sq mi)
- Elevation: 257 m (843 ft)

Population (2026-01-01)
  - Total: 286
  - Density: 55.0/km^{2} (142/sq mi)
- Time zone: UTC+1 (CET)
  - Summer (DST): UTC+2 (CEST)
- Postal codes: 798 27, 798 30
- Website: www.pavlovice.cz

Pavlovice u Kojetína is a municipality and village in Prostějov District in the Olomouc Region of the Czech Republic. It has about 300 inhabitants.

Pavlovice u Kojetína lies approximately 21 kilometres (13 mi) south of Prostějov, 33 km (21 mi) south of Olomouc, and 219 km (136 mi) south-east of Prague.

== Administrative division ==
Pavlovice u Kojetína consists of two municipal parts (in brackets population according to the 2021 census):

- Pavlovice u Kojetína (194)
- Unčice (64)

== Demographics ==
Historical population
| Year | Pop. | ±% |
|---|---|---|
| 1869 | 494 | — |
| 1880 | 548 | +10.9% |
| 1890 | 542 | −1.1% |
| 1900 | 573 | +5.7% |
| 1910 | 628 | +9.6% |
| 1921 | 652 | +3.8% |
| 1930 | 611 | −6.3% |
| 1950 | 454 | −25.7% |
| 1961 | 469 | +3.3% |
| 1970 | 427 | −9.0% |
| 1980 | 352 | −17.6% |
| 1991 | 329 | −6.5% |
| 2001 | 309 | −6.1% |
| 2011 | 284 | −8.1% |
| 2021 | 258 | −9.2% |
Source: Censuses
