= Hrușca =

- Commune
- Interactive map of Hrușca
- Location within Moldova
- Coordinates: 48°7′20″N 28°33′4″E
- Country (de jure): Moldova
- Country (de facto): Transnistria (Note: Transnistria's political status is disputed. It considers itself to be an independent state, but this is not recognised by any UN member state. The Moldovan government and the international community consider Transnistria a part of Moldova's territory.)
- Elevation: 90 m (300 ft)

Population (1979)
  - Total: 2,800
- Time zone: UTC+2 (EET)
  - Summer (DST): UTC+3 (EEST)

Hrușca (Moldovan Cyrillic: Хришка, Ukrainian: Грушка, Hrushka, Russian: Грушка, Grushka) is a commune in the Camenca District of Transnistria, Moldova. It is composed of two villages, Frunzăuca (Фрунзівка, Фрунзовка) and Hrușca. Since 1990, it has been administered as a part of the breakaway Pridnestrovian Moldavian Republic.

According to the 2004 census, the population of the locality was 1,290 inhabitants, of which 921 (71.39%) were Moldovans (Romanians), 309 (23.95%) Ukrainians and 46 (3.48%) Russians.
