= Hrušky (Vyškov District) =

- Municipality
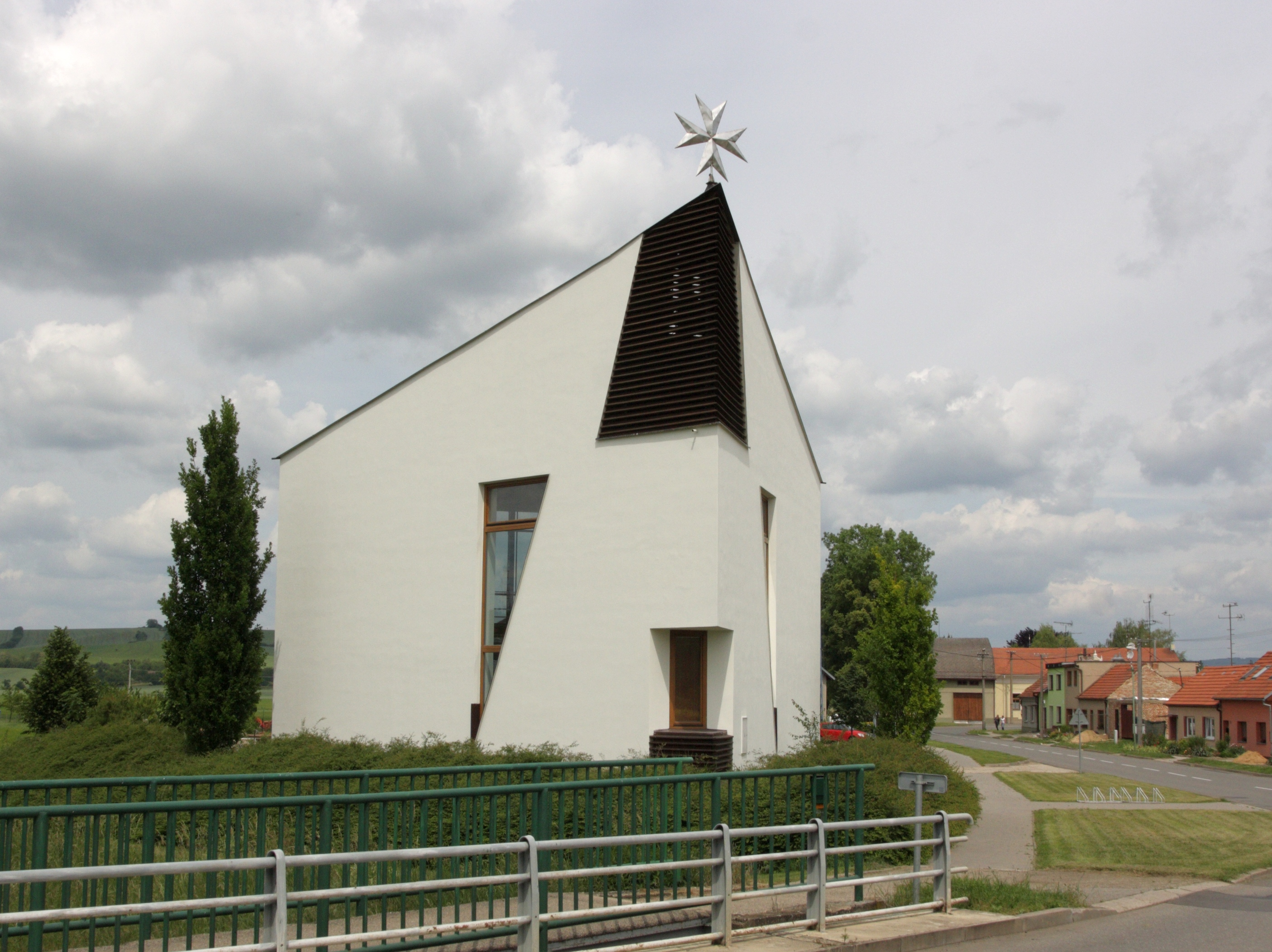
- Chapel of Our Lady of the Snows

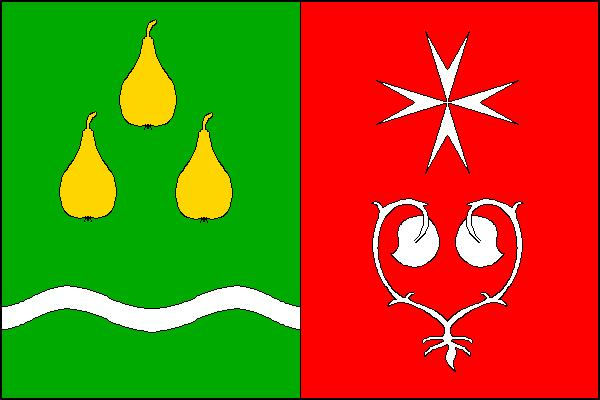
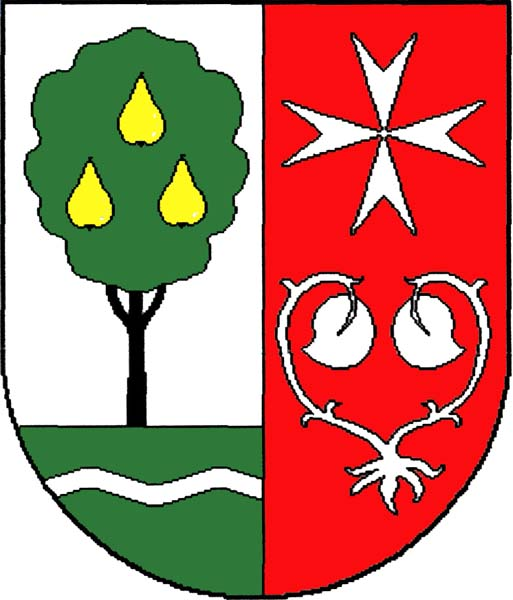
- Flag Coat of arms

- Location in the Czech Republic
- Coordinates: 49°7′45″N 16°50′0″E
- Country: Czech Republic
- Region: South Moravian
- District: Vyškov
- First mentioned: 1294

Area
  - Total: 5.47 km^{2} (2.11 sq mi)
- Elevation: 199 m (653 ft)

Population (2026-01-01)
  - Total: 784
  - Density: 143/km^{2} (371/sq mi)
- Time zone: UTC+1 (CET)
  - Summer (DST): UTC+2 (CEST)
- Postal code: 683 52
- Website: www.obec-hrusky.cz

Hrušky (German: Birnbaum) is a municipality and village in Vyškov District in the South Moravian Region of the Czech Republic. It has about 800 inhabitants.

Hrušky lies approximately 20 kilometres (12 mi) south-west of Vyškov, 19 km (12 mi) south-east of Brno, and 205 km (127 mi) south-east of Prague.

== Demographics ==
Historical population
Year	Pop.	±%
1869	632	—
1880	686	+8.5%
1890	745	+8.6%
1900	786	+5.5%
1910	870	+10.7%
1921	932	+7.1%
1930	1,004	+7.7%
1950	849	−15.4%
1961	917	+8.0%
1970	853	−7.0%
1980	836	−2.0%
1991	754	−9.8%
2001	742	−1.6%
2011	767	+3.4%
2021	777	+1.3%
Source: Censuses
