= Doloplazy =

Doloplazy may refer to places in the Czech Republic:

- Doloplazy (Olomouc District), a municipality and village in the Olomouc Region
- Doloplazy (Prostějov District), a municipality and village in the Olomouc Region
- Doloplazy, a hamlet and part of Neveklov in the Central Bohemian Region
