= Březsko =

- Municipality
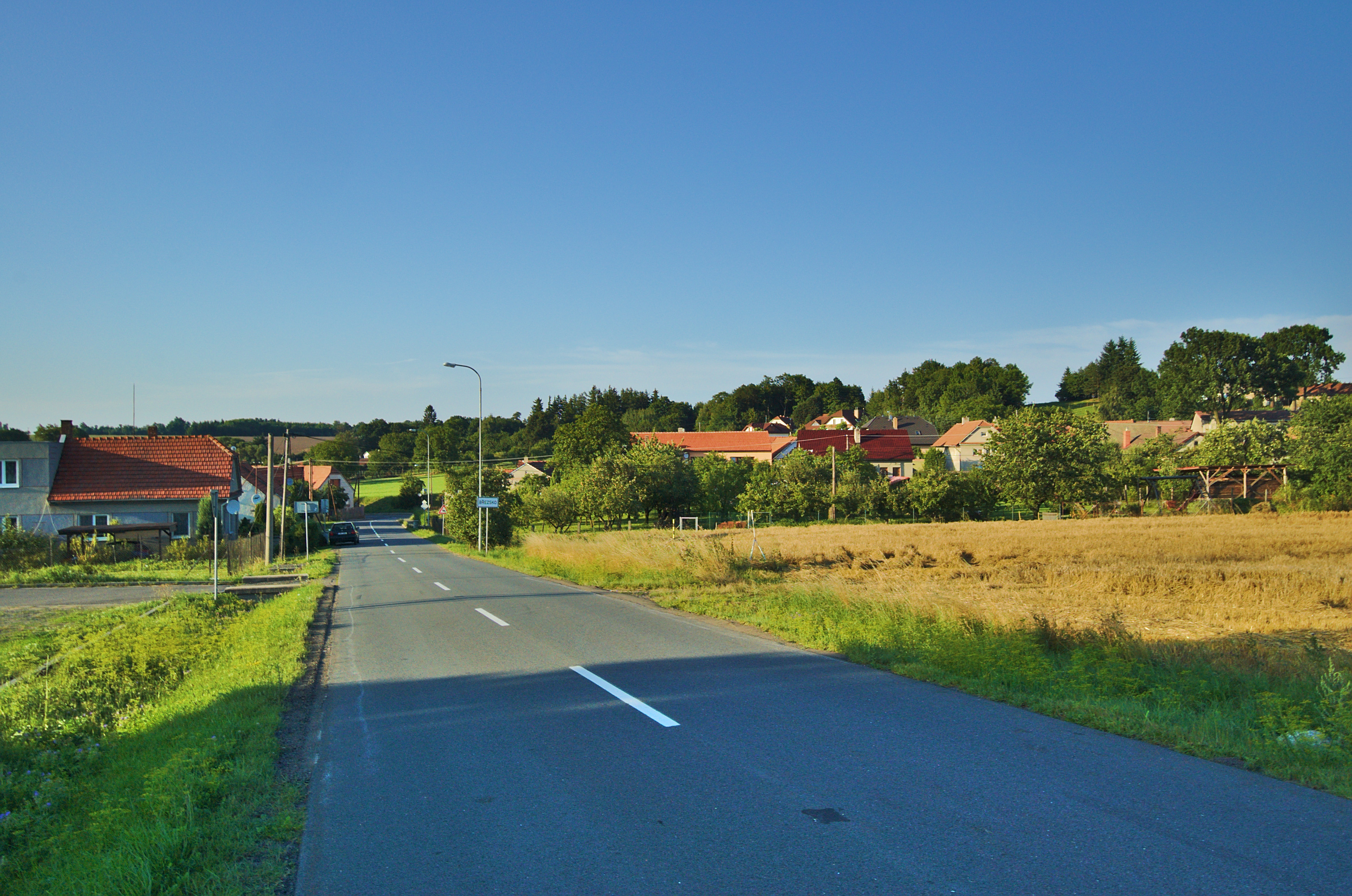
- View from the south

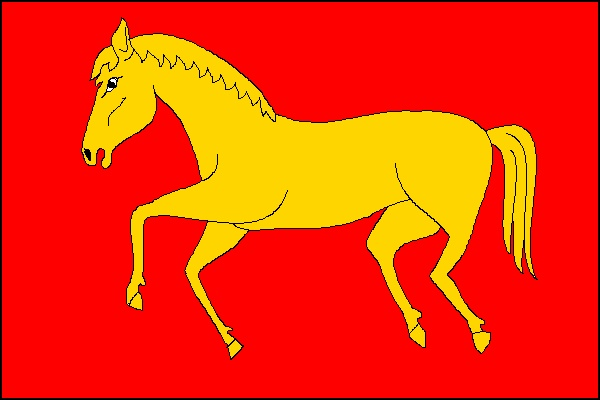
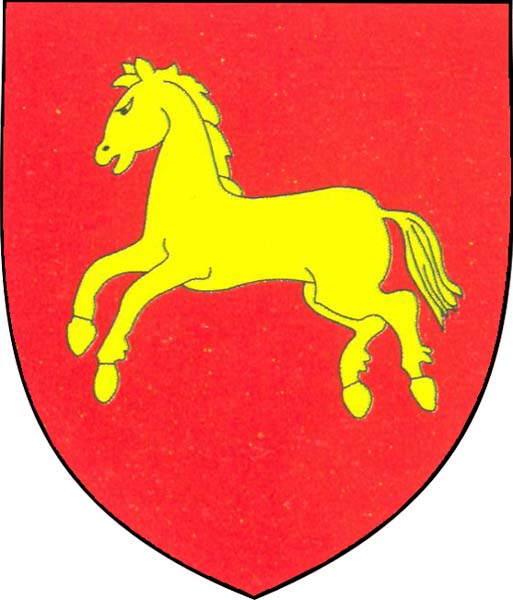
- Flag Coat of arms

- Location in the Czech Republic
- Coordinates: 49°36′31″N 16°53′33″E
- Country: Czech Republic
- Region: Olomouc
- District: Prostějov
- First mentioned: 1351

Area
  - Total: 4.05 km^{2} (1.56 sq mi)
- Elevation: 510 m (1,670 ft)

Population (2026-01-01)
  - Total: 210
  - Density: 52/km^{2} (130/sq mi)
- Time zone: UTC+1 (CET)
  - Summer (DST): UTC+2 (CEST)
- Postal code: 798 52
- Website: www.obecbrezsko.cz

Březsko is a municipality and village in Prostějov District in the Olomouc Region of the Czech Republic. It has about 200 inhabitants.

Březsko lies approximately 23 kilometres (14 mi) north-west of Prostějov, 27 km (17 mi) west of Olomouc, and 185 km (115 mi) east of Prague.

== Demographics ==
Historical population
Year	Pop.	±%
1869	551	—
1880	570	+3.4%
1890	572	+0.4%
1900	520	−9.1%
1910	522	+0.4%
1921	494	−5.4%
1930	464	−6.1%
1950	355	−23.5%
1961	385	+8.5%
1970	320	−16.9%
1980	269	−15.9%
1991	227	−15.6%
2001	223	−1.8%
2011	206	−7.6%
2021	184	−10.7%
Source: Censuses
