= Raková u Konice =

- Municipality
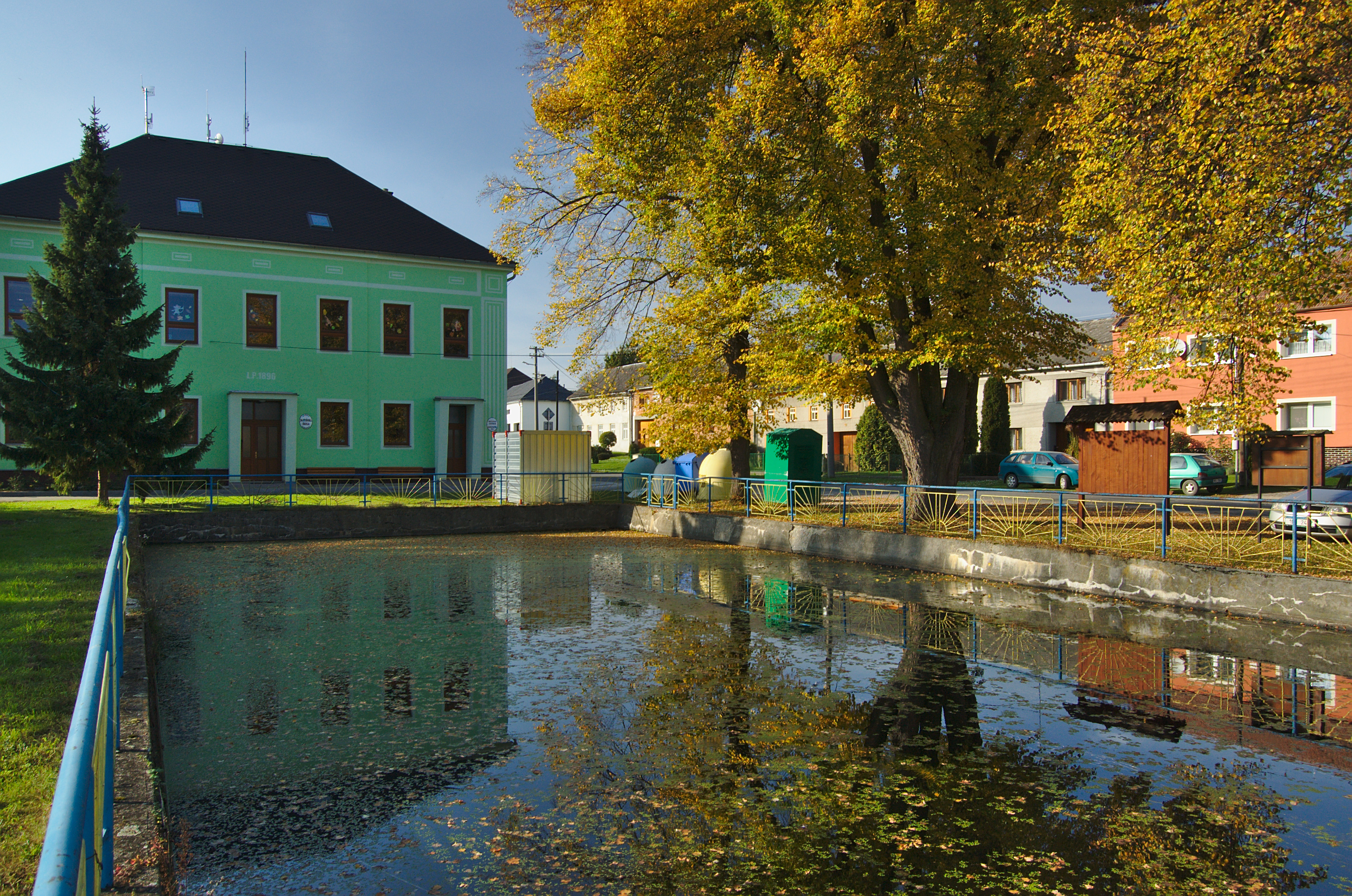
- Water tank in the centre of Raková u Konice

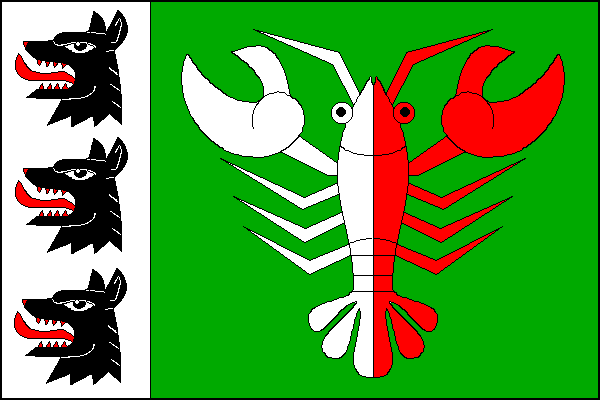
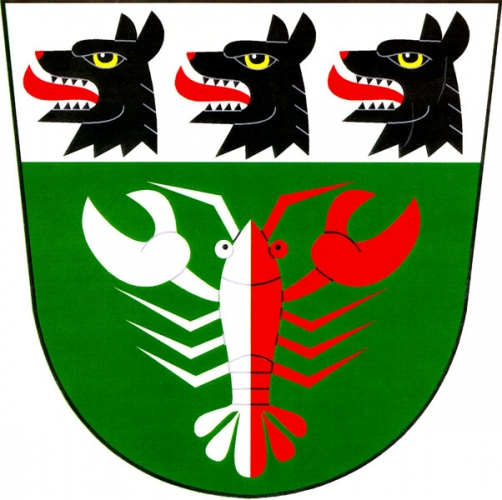
- Flag Coat of arms

- Location in the Czech Republic
- Coordinates: 49°36′26″N 16°57′3″E
- Country: Czech Republic
- Region: Olomouc
- District: Prostějov
- First mentioned: 1276

Area
  - Total: 4.21 km^{2} (1.63 sq mi)
- Elevation: 404 m (1,325 ft)

Population (2026-01-01)
  - Total: 201
  - Density: 47.7/km^{2} (124/sq mi)
- Time zone: UTC+1 (CET)
  - Summer (DST): UTC+2 (CEST)
- Postal code: 798 57
- Website: www.rakova.cz

Raková u Konice is a municipality and village in Prostějov District in the Olomouc Region of the Czech Republic. It has about 200 inhabitants.

Raková u Konice lies approximately 19 kilometres (12 mi) north-west of Prostějov, 22 km (14 mi) west of Olomouc, and 190 km (120 mi) east of Prague.

== Demographics ==
Historical population
| Year | Pop. | ±% |
|---|---|---|
| 1869 | 497 | — |
| 1880 | 506 | +1.8% |
| 1890 | 499 | −1.4% |
| 1900 | 468 | −6.2% |
| 1910 | 451 | −3.6% |
| 1921 | 457 | +1.3% |
| 1930 | 438 | −4.2% |
| 1950 | 354 | −19.2% |
| 1961 | 323 | −8.8% |
| 1970 | 270 | −16.4% |
| 1980 | 223 | −17.4% |
| 1991 | 168 | −24.7% |
| 2001 | 181 | +7.7% |
| 2011 | 191 | +5.5% |
| 2021 | 194 | +1.6% |
Source: Censuses
