= Bousín =

- Municipality
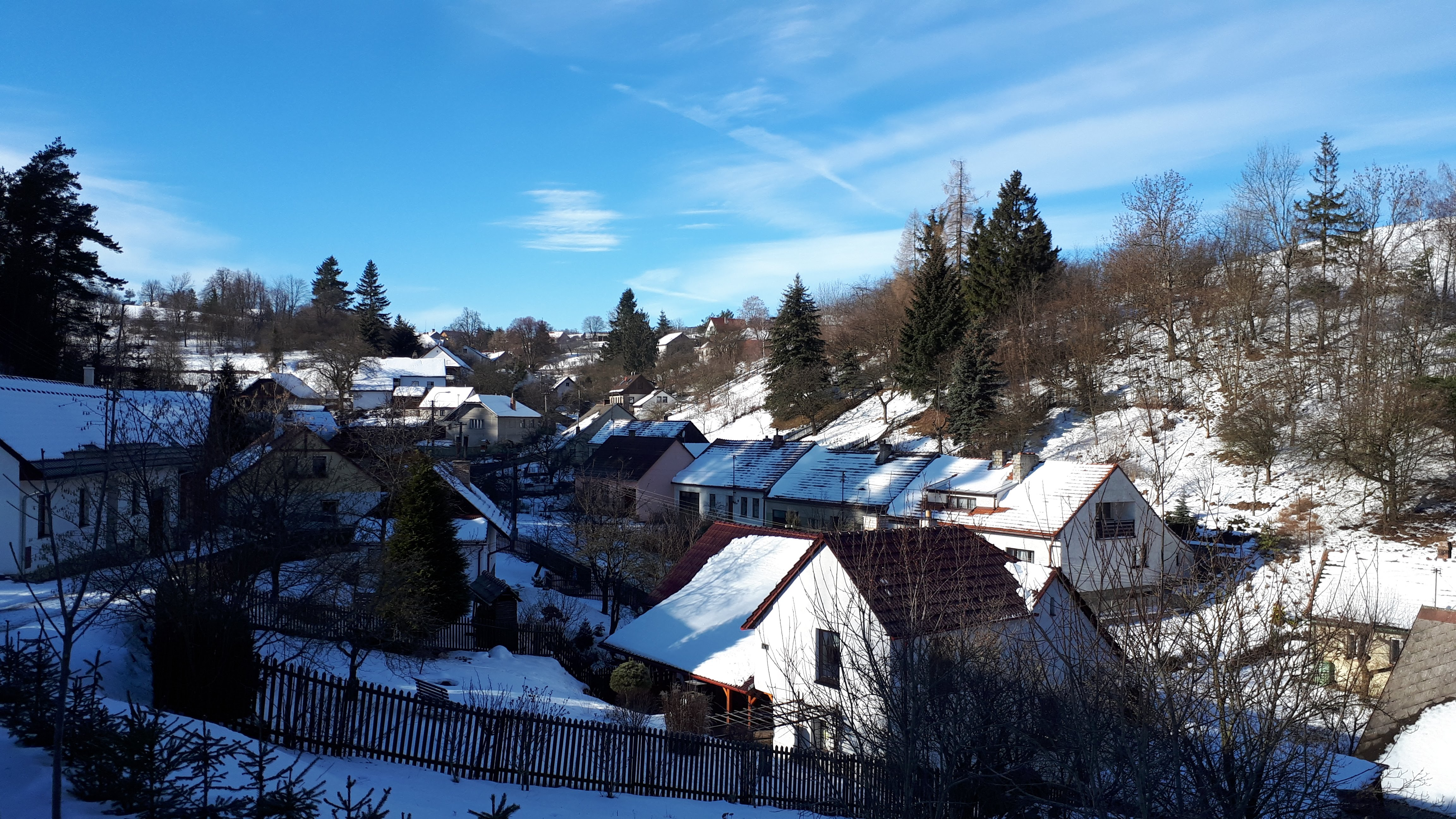
- Repechy, a part of Bousín

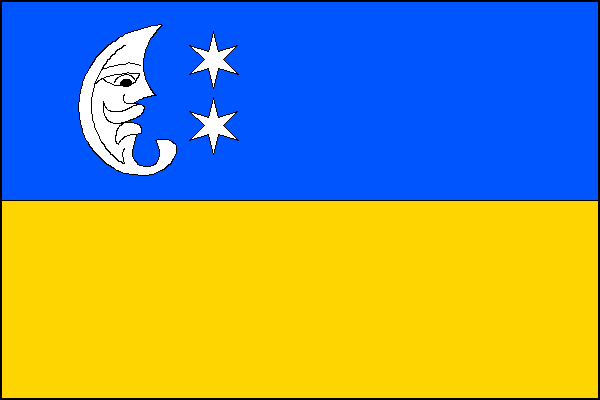
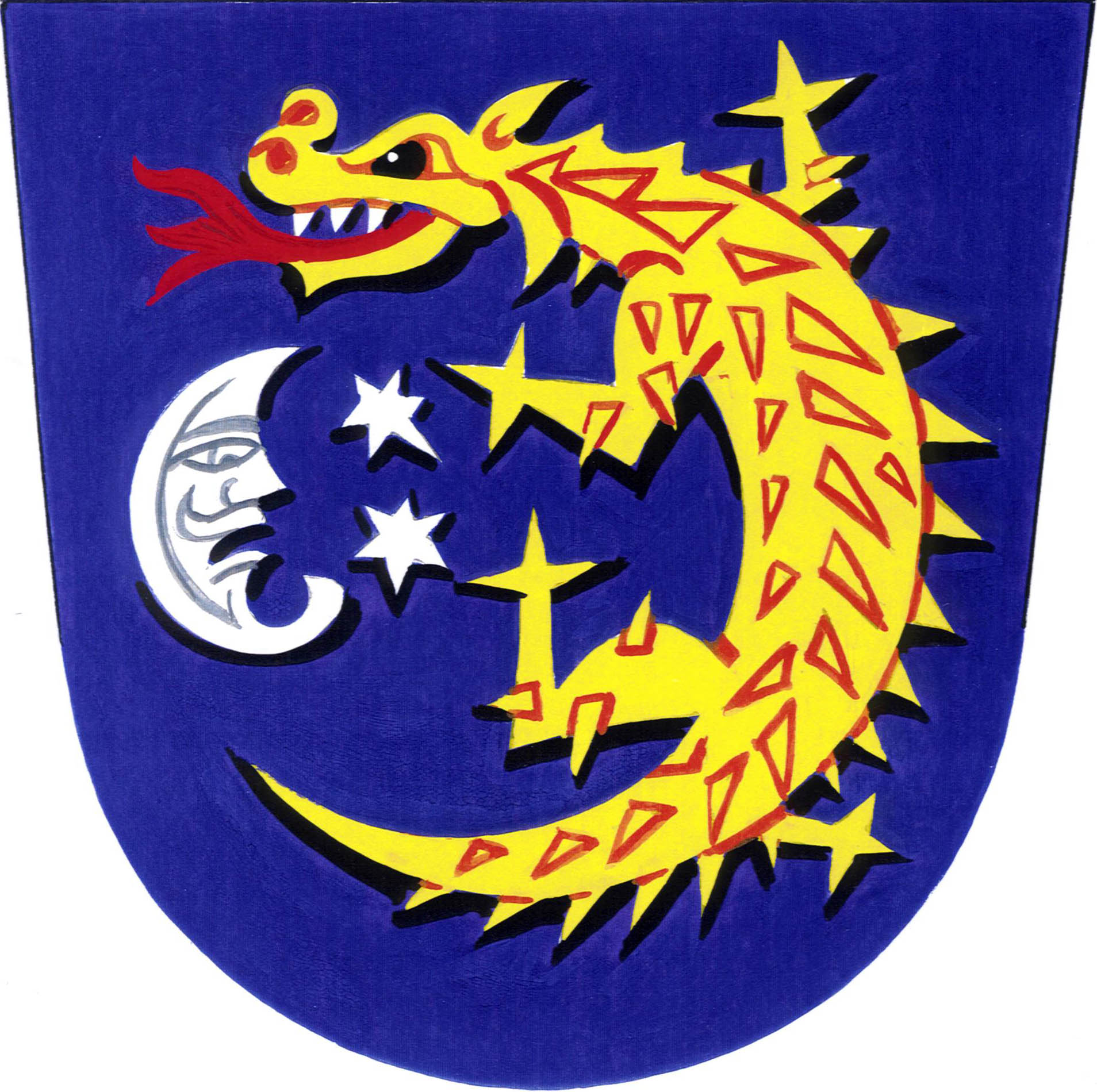
- Flag Coat of arms

- Location in the Czech Republic
- Coordinates: 49°27′18″N 16°53′23″E
- Country: Czech Republic
- Region: Olomouc
- District: Prostějov
- First mentioned: 1347

Area
  - Total: 3.42 km^{2} (1.32 sq mi)
- Elevation: 611 m (2,005 ft)

Population (2026-01-01)
  - Total: 124
  - Density: 36.3/km^{2} (93.9/sq mi)
- Time zone: UTC+1 (CET)
  - Summer (DST): UTC+2 (CEST)
- Postal code: 798 61
- Website: www.bousin.cz

Bousín is a municipality and village in Prostějov District in the Olomouc Region of the Czech Republic. It has about 100 inhabitants.

Bousín lies approximately 17 kilometres (11 mi) west of Prostějov, 31 km (19 mi) south-west of Olomouc, and 191 km (119 mi) east of Prague.

== Administrative division ==
Bousín consists of two municipal parts (in brackets population according to the 2021 census):

- Bousín (99)
- Repechy (27)

== History ==
The first written mention of Bousín is from 1347.

== Demographics ==
Historical population
Year	Pop.	±%
1869	518	—
1880	541	+4.4%
1890	508	−6.1%
1900	550	+8.3%
1910	596	+8.4%
1921	596	+0.0%
1930	578	−3.0%
1950	286	−50.5%
1961	326	+14.0%
1970	275	−15.6%
1980	217	−21.1%
1991	169	−22.1%
2001	140	−17.2%
2011	132	−5.7%
2021	126	−4.5%
Source: Censuses
