= Bohuslavice (Prostějov District) =

- Municipality
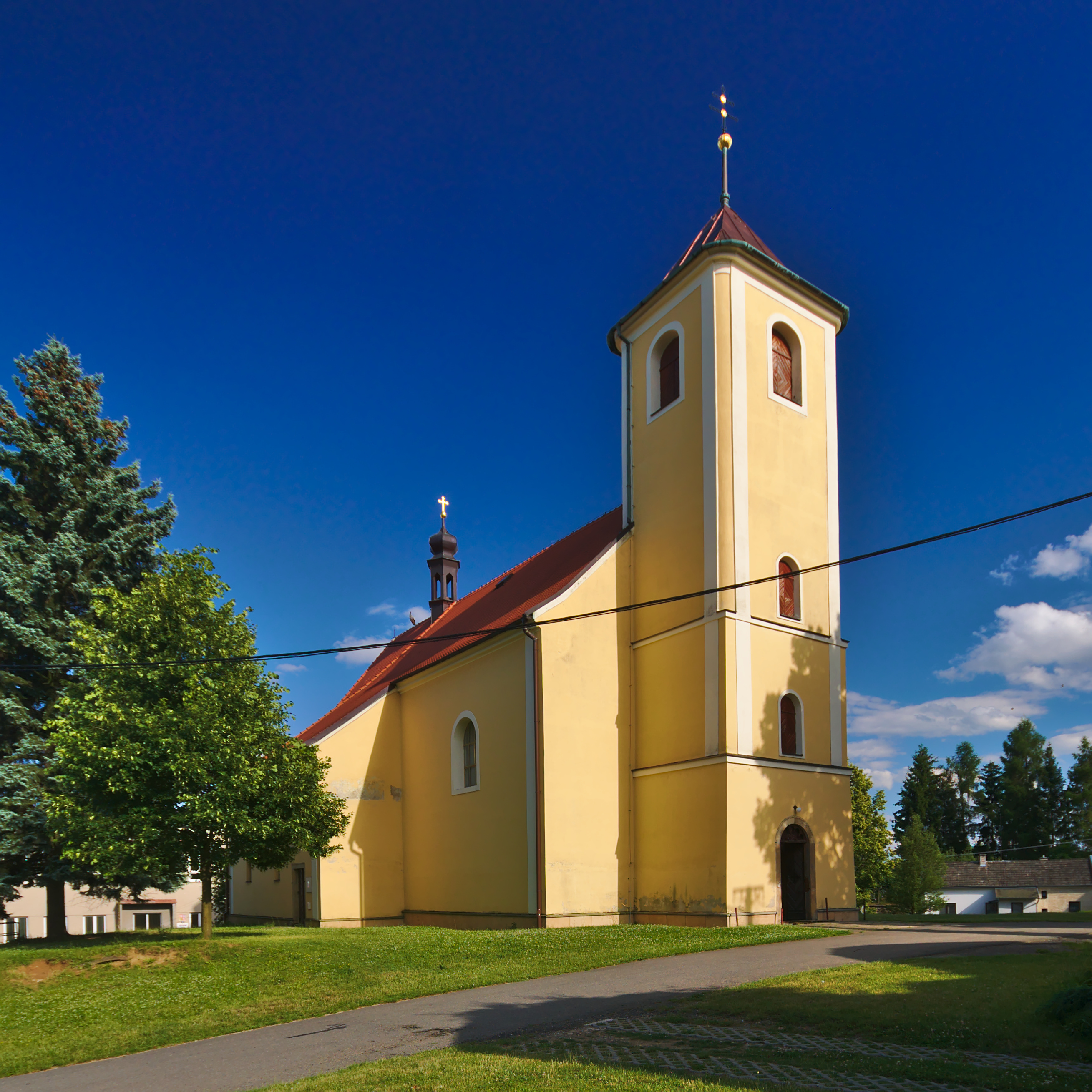
- Church of Saint Bartholomew

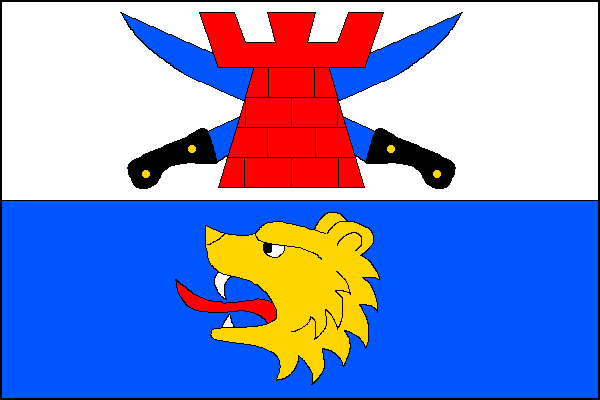
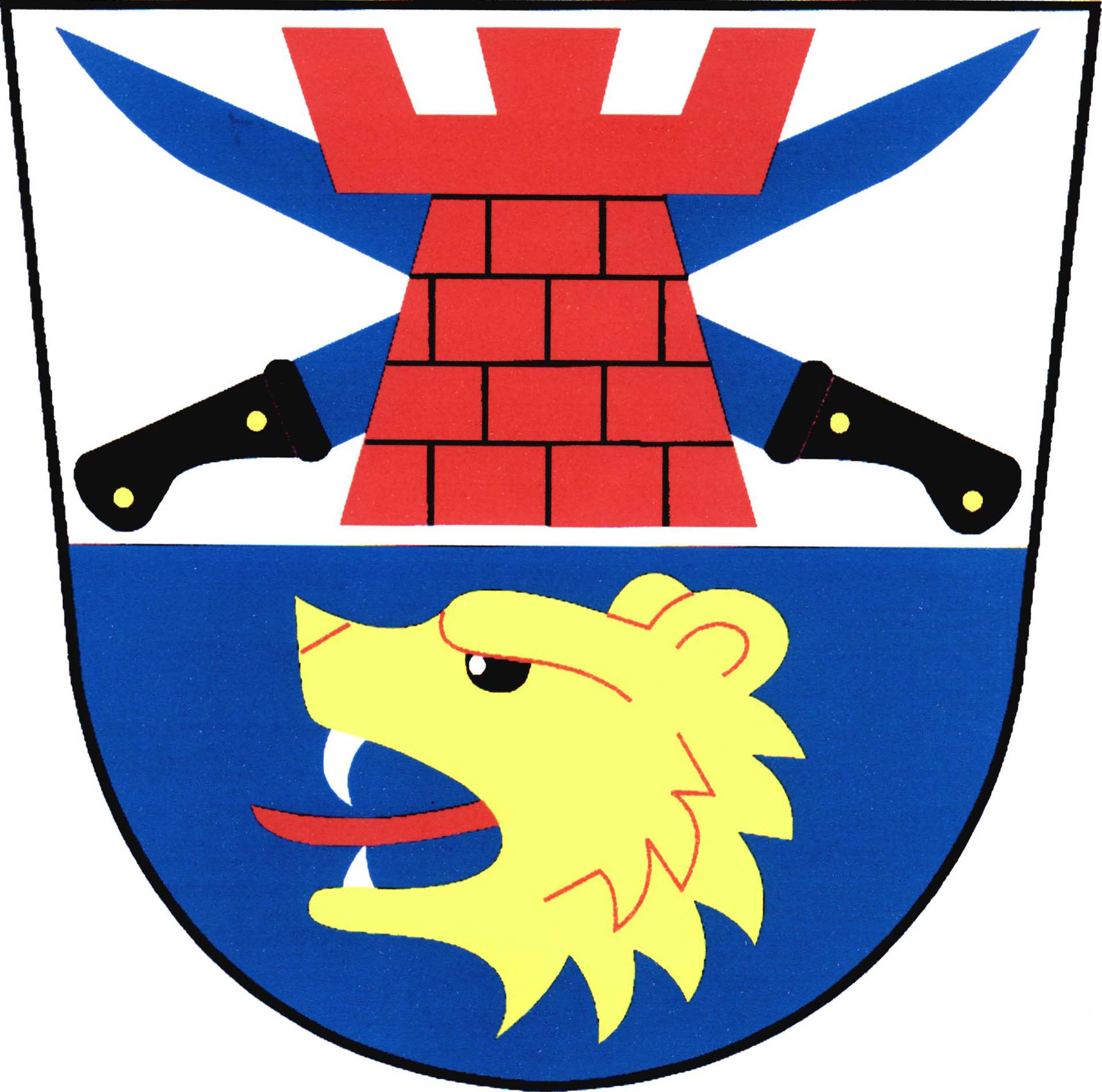
- Flag Coat of arms

- Location in the Czech Republic
- Coordinates: 49°37′15″N 16°57′27″E
- Country: Czech Republic
- Region: Olomouc
- District: Prostějov
- First mentioned: 1288

Area
  - Total: 4.87 km^{2} (1.88 sq mi)
- Elevation: 409 m (1,342 ft)

Population (2026-01-01)
  - Total: 449
  - Density: 92.2/km^{2} (239/sq mi)
- Time zone: UTC+1 (CET)
  - Summer (DST): UTC+2 (CEST)
- Postal code: 798 56
- Website: www.obec-bohuslavice.cz

Bohuslavice is a municipality and village in Prostějov District in the Olomouc Region of the Czech Republic. It has about 400 inhabitants.

Bohuslavice lies approximately 20 kilometres (12 mi) north-west of Prostějov, 22 km (14 mi) west of Olomouc, and 190 km (120 mi) east of Prague.

== Demographics ==
Historical population
Year	Pop.	±%
1869	283	—
1880	255	−9.9%
1890	308	+20.8%
1900	333	+8.1%
1910	353	+6.0%
1921	313	−11.3%
1930	317	+1.3%
1950	317	+0.0%
1961	337	+6.3%
1970	292	−13.4%
1980	286	−2.1%
1991	470	+64.3%
2001	519	+10.4%
2011	456	−12.1%
2021	448	−1.8%
Source: Censuses
