= Vitčice =

- Municipality
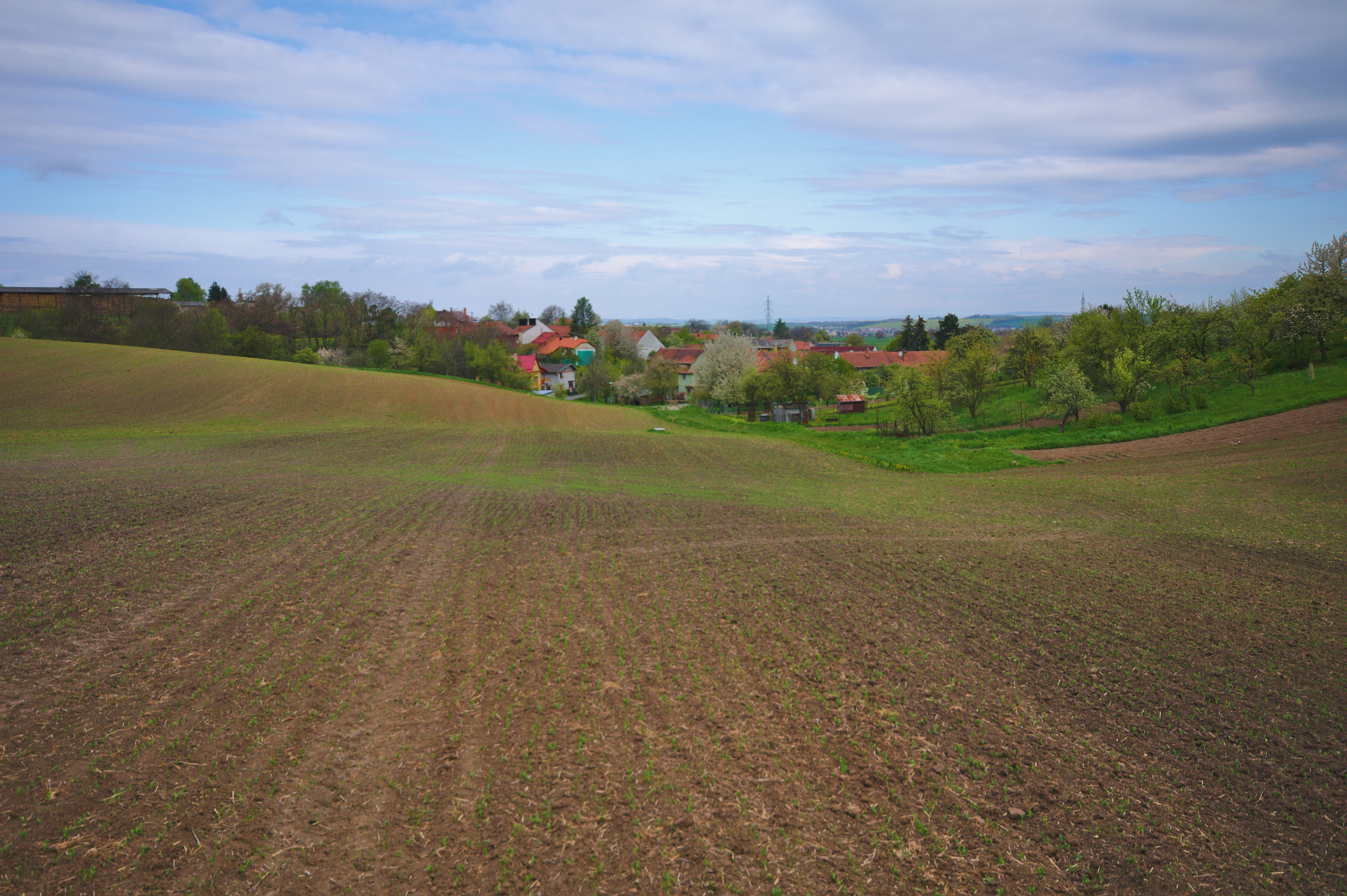
- View from the south

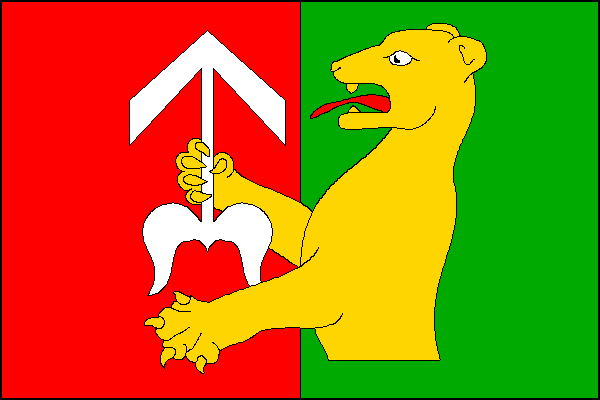
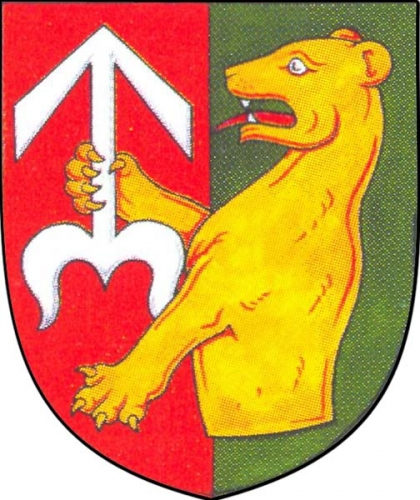
- Flag Coat of arms

- Location in the Czech Republic
- Coordinates: 49°18′43″N 17°14′27″E
- Country: Czech Republic
- Region: Olomouc
- District: Prostějov
- First mentioned: 1353

Area
  - Total: 4.59 km^{2} (1.77 sq mi)
- Elevation: 237 m (778 ft)

Population (2026-01-01)
  - Total: 185
  - Density: 40.3/km^{2} (104/sq mi)
- Time zone: UTC+1 (CET)
  - Summer (DST): UTC+2 (CEST)
- Postal code: 798 27
- Website: www.vitcice.cz

Vitčice is a municipality and village in Prostějov District in the Olomouc Region of the Czech Republic. It has about 200 inhabitants.

Vitčice lies approximately 21 kilometres (13 mi) south-east of Prostějov, 32 km (20 mi) south of Olomouc, and 221 km (137 mi) south-east of Prague.

== Demographics ==
Historical population
Year	Pop.	±%
1869	373	—
1880	352	−5.6%
1890	415	+17.9%
1900	389	−6.3%
1910	425	+9.3%
1921	487	+14.6%
1930	429	−11.9%
1950	310	−27.7%
1961	319	+2.9%
1970	296	−7.2%
1980	247	−16.6%
1991	211	−14.6%
2001	189	−10.4%
2011	160	−15.3%
2021	178	+11.3%
Source: Censuses
