= Tvorovice =

- Municipality
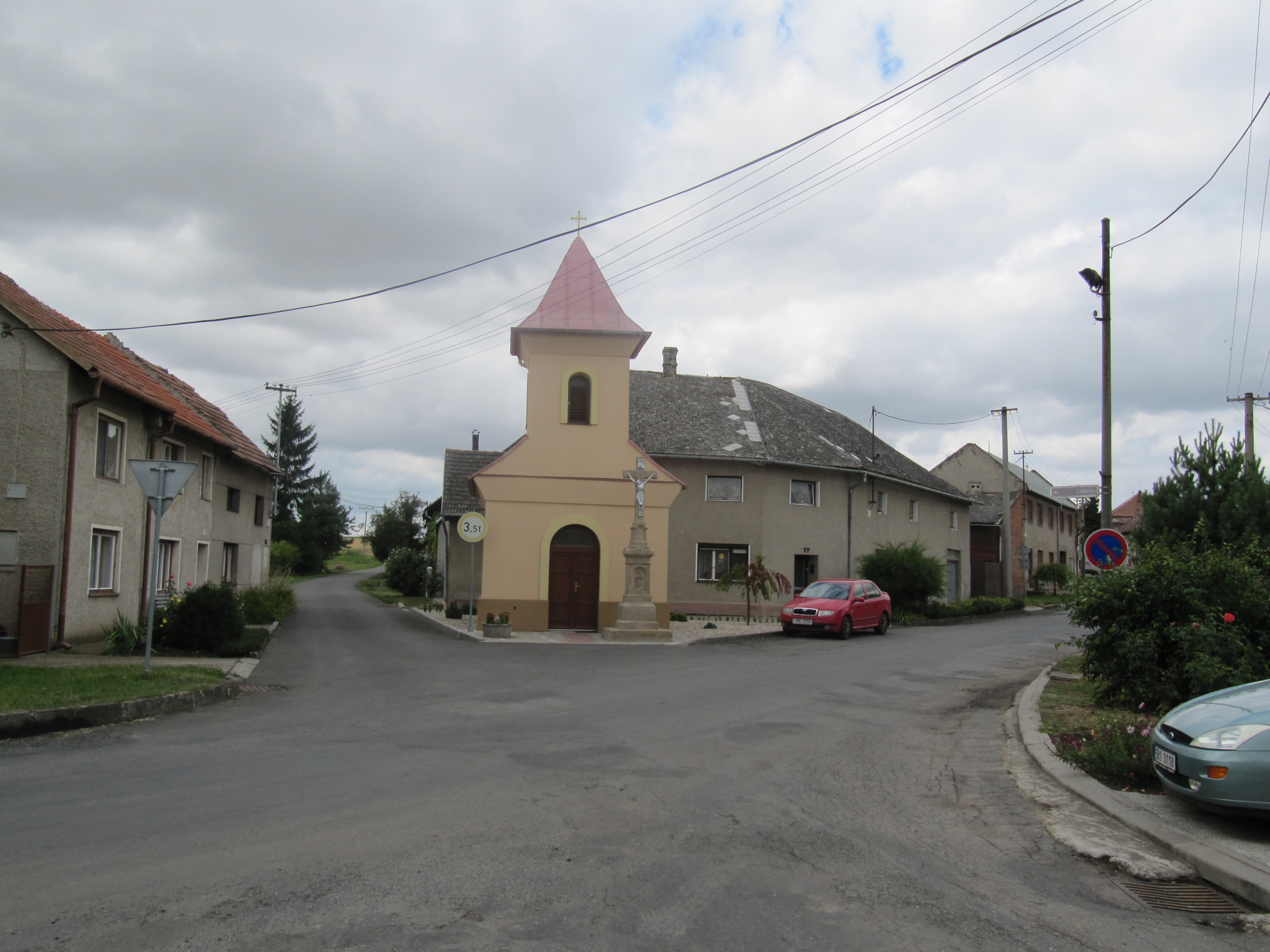
- Chapel of Saint Bartholomew in the centre of Tvorovice

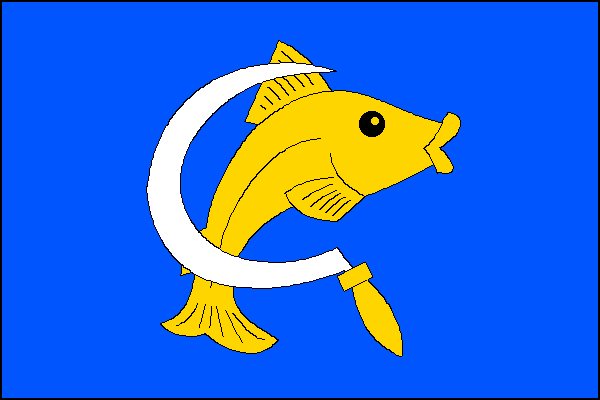
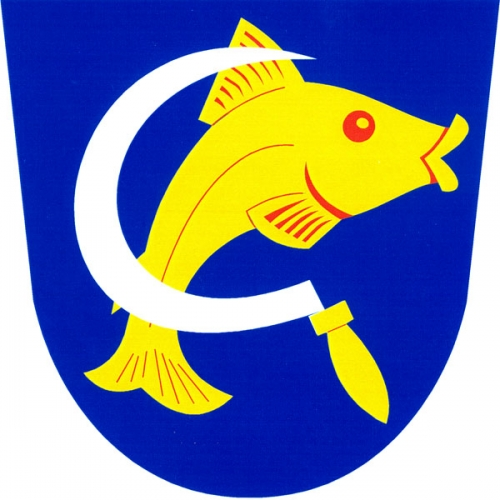
- Flag Coat of arms

- Location in the Czech Republic
- Coordinates: 49°22′28″N 17°13′19″E
- Country: Czech Republic
- Region: Olomouc
- District: Prostějov
- First mentioned: 1367

Area
  - Total: 3.72 km^{2} (1.44 sq mi)
- Elevation: 232 m (761 ft)

Population (2026-01-01)
  - Total: 288
  - Density: 77.4/km^{2} (201/sq mi)
- Time zone: UTC+1 (CET)
  - Summer (DST): UTC+2 (CEST)
- Postal code: 798 23
- Website: www.tvorovice.cz

Tvorovice is a municipality and village in Prostějov District in the Olomouc Region of the Czech Republic. It has about 300 inhabitants.

Tvorovice lies approximately 14 kilometres (9 mi) south-east of Prostějov, 25 km (16 mi) south of Olomouc, and 217 km (135 mi) east of Prague.

== Demographics ==
Historical population
| Year | Pop. | ±% |
|---|---|---|
| 1869 | 414 | — |
| 1880 | 457 | +10.4% |
| 1890 | 437 | −4.4% |
| 1900 | 474 | +8.5% |
| 1910 | 478 | +0.8% |
| 1921 | 494 | +3.3% |
| 1930 | 500 | +1.2% |
| 1950 | 412 | −17.6% |
| 1961 | 436 | +5.8% |
| 1970 | 430 | −1.4% |
| 1980 | 376 | −12.6% |
| 1991 | 312 | −17.0% |
| 2001 | 300 | −3.8% |
| 2011 | 292 | −2.7% |
| 2021 | 272 | −6.8% |
Source: Censuses
