= Šubířov =

- Municipality
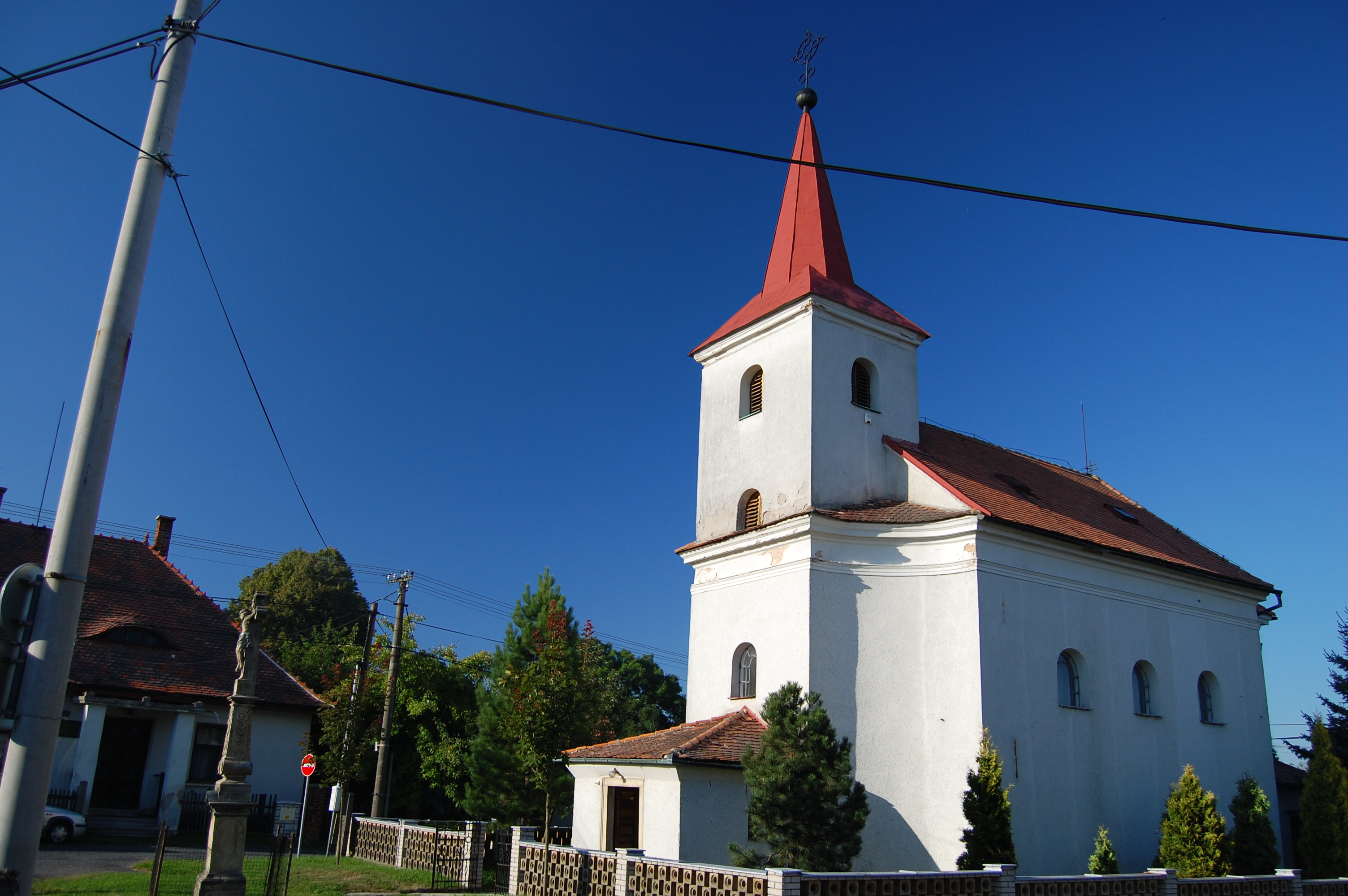
- Church of Our Lady of Sorrows

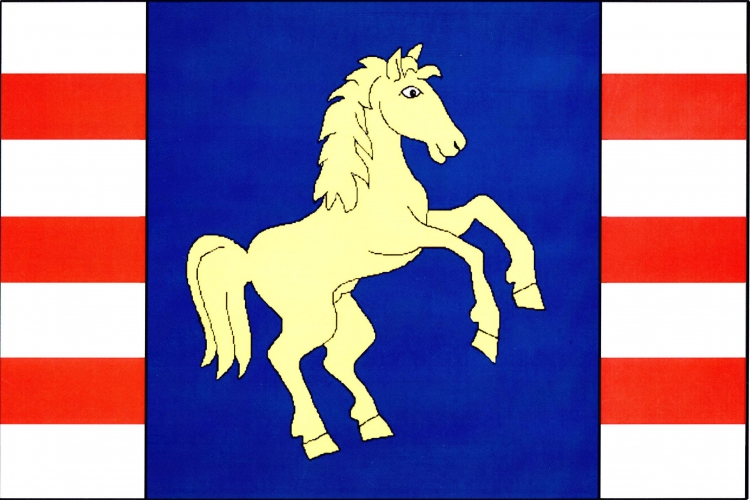
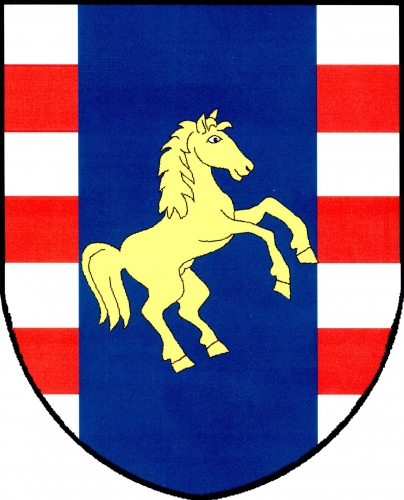
- Flag Coat of arms

- Location in the Czech Republic
- Coordinates: 49°36′8″N 16°48′48″E
- Country: Czech Republic
- Region: Olomouc
- District: Prostějov
- First mentioned: 1710

Area
  - Total: 2.54 km^{2} (0.98 sq mi)
- Elevation: 564 m (1,850 ft)

Population (2026-01-01)
  - Total: 265
  - Density: 104/km^{2} (270/sq mi)
- Time zone: UTC+1 (CET)
  - Summer (DST): UTC+2 (CEST)
- Postal code: 798 52
- Website: www.subirov.cz

Šubířov is a municipality and village in Prostějov District in the Olomouc Region of the Czech Republic. It has about 300 inhabitants.

Šubířov lies approximately 27 kilometres (17 mi) north-west of Prostějov, 32 km (20 mi) west of Olomouc, and 180 km (110 mi) east of Prague.

== Administrative division ==
Šubířov consists of two municipal parts (in brackets population according to the 2021 census):

- Šubířov (180)
- Chobyně (64)

== Demographics ==
Historical population
Year	Pop.	±%
1869	911	—
1880	833	−8.6%
1890	851	+2.2%
1900	877	+3.1%
1910	858	−2.2%
1921	783	−8.7%
1930	730	−6.8%
1950	486	−33.4%
1961	542	+11.5%
1970	469	−13.5%
1980	374	−20.3%
1991	296	−20.9%
2001	273	−7.8%
2011	231	−15.4%
2021	244	+5.6%
Source: Censuses
