= Koválovice-Osíčany =

- Municipality
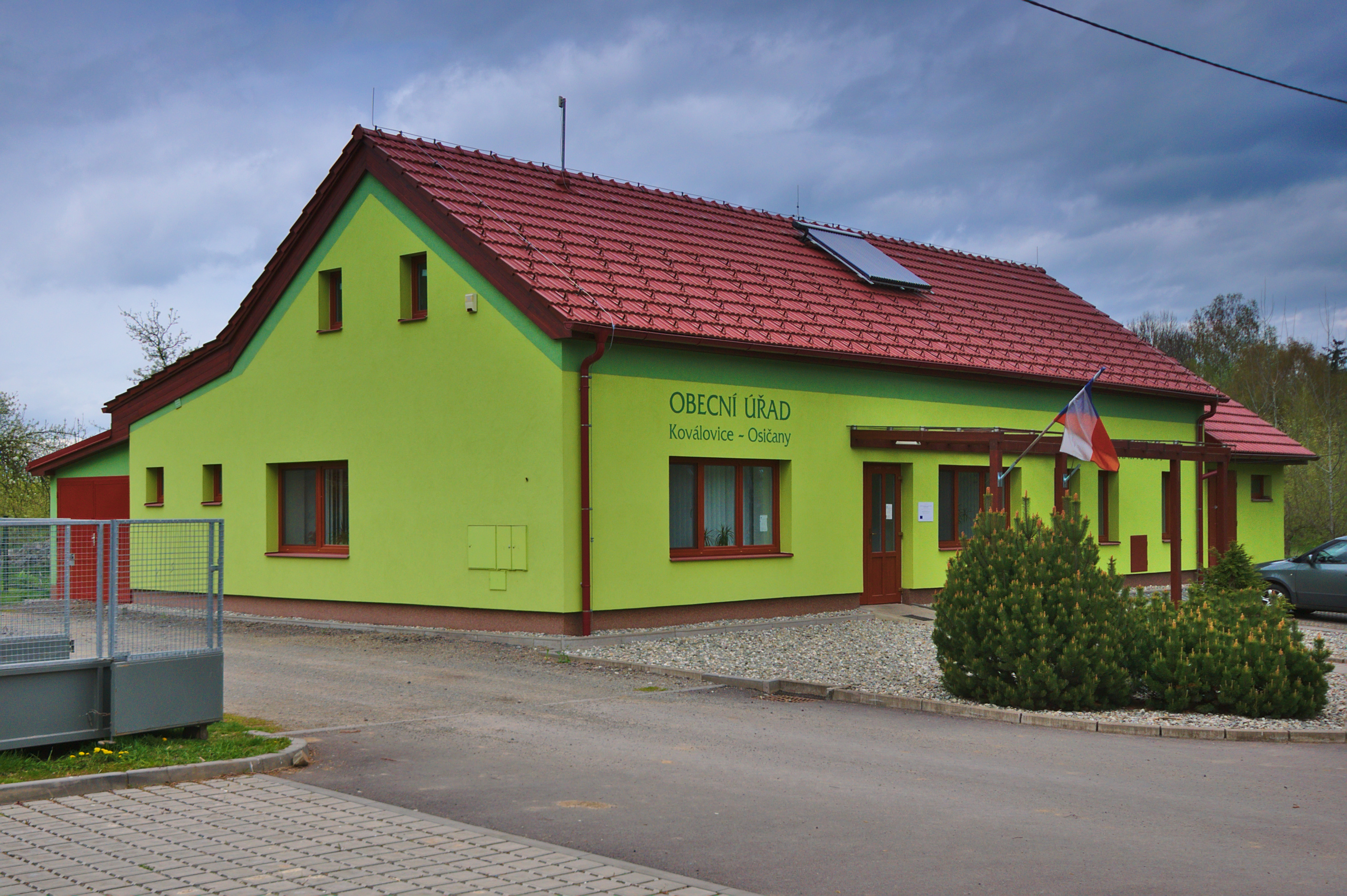
- Municipal office

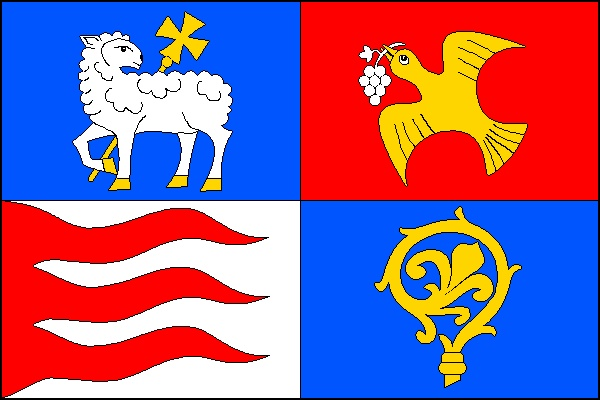
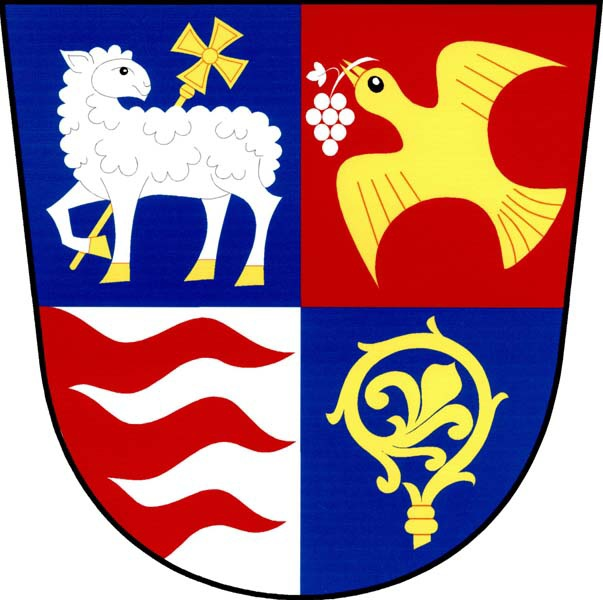
- Flag Coat of arms

- Location in the Czech Republic
- Coordinates: 49°17′7″N 17°10′12″E
- Country: Czech Republic
- Region: Olomouc
- District: Prostějov
- First mentioned: 1349

Area
  - Total: 4.44 km^{2} (1.71 sq mi)
- Elevation: 238 m (781 ft)

Population (2026-01-01)
  - Total: 271
  - Density: 61.0/km^{2} (158/sq mi)
- Time zone: UTC+1 (CET)
  - Summer (DST): UTC+2 (CEST)
- Postal code: 798 29
- Website: www.kovaloviceosicany.cz

Koválovice-Osíčany is a municipality in Prostějov District in the Olomouc Region of the Czech Republic. It has about 300 inhabitants.

Koválovice-Osíčany lies approximately 22 kilometres (14 mi) south of Prostějov, 36 km (22 mi) south of Olomouc, and 218 km (135 mi) south-east of Prague.

== Administrative division ==
Koválovice-Osíčany consists of two municipal parts (in brackets population according to the 2021 census):

- Koválovice u Tištína (154)
- Osíčany (103)

== Demographics ==
Historical population
Year	Pop.	±%
1869	424	—
1880	450	+6.1%
1890	469	+4.2%
1900	466	−0.6%
1910	483	+3.6%
1921	505	+4.6%
1930	515	+2.0%
1950	411	−20.2%
1961	408	−0.7%
1970	384	−5.9%
1980	331	−13.8%
1991	315	−4.8%
2001	284	−9.8%
2011	295	+3.9%
2021	257	−12.9%
Source: Censuses
