= Srbce =

- Municipality
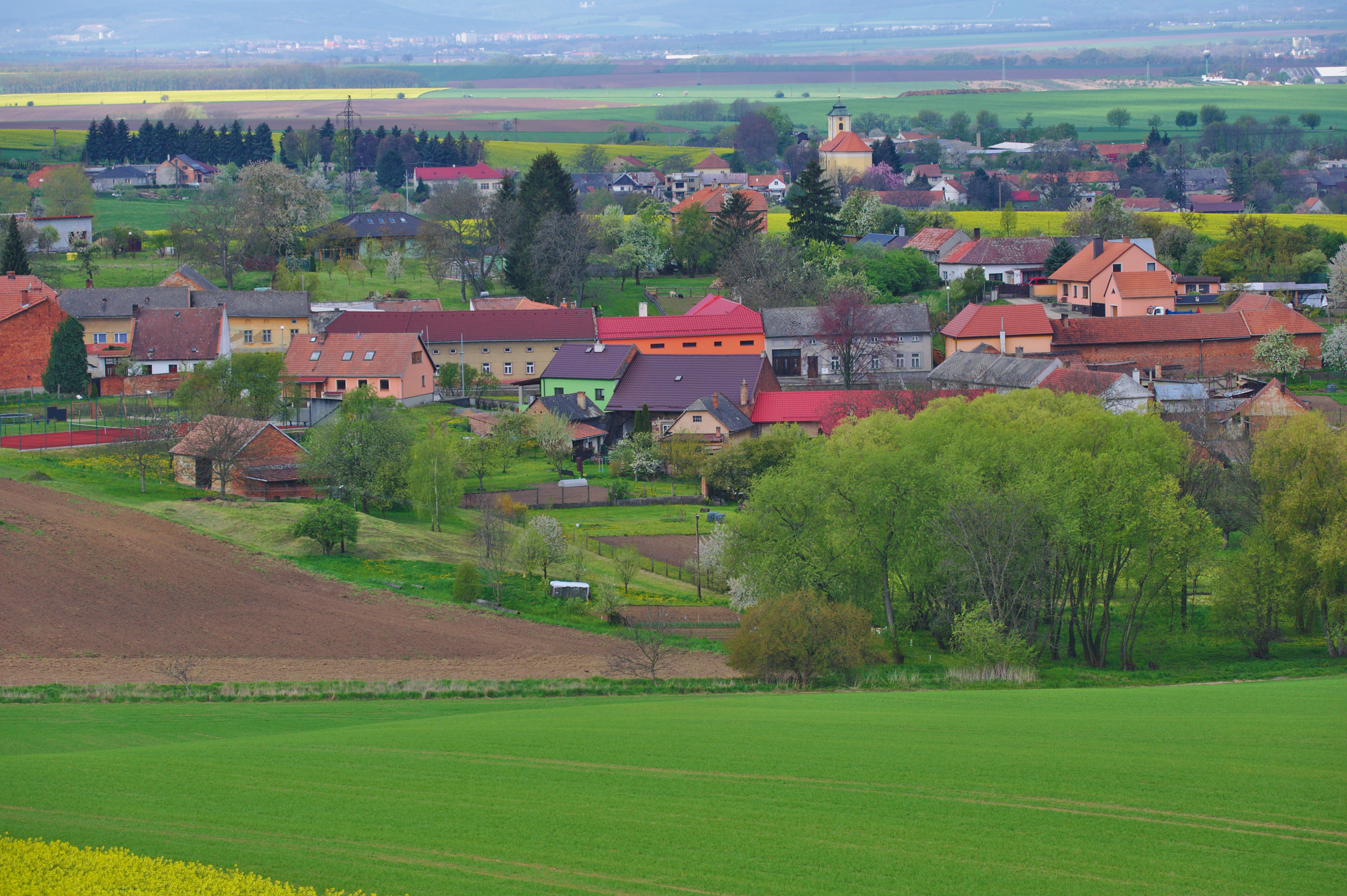
- View from the east

- Flag Coat of arms

- Location in the Czech Republic
- Coordinates: 49°18′8″N 17°13′45″E
- Country: Czech Republic
- Region: Olomouc
- District: Prostějov
- First mentioned: 1141

Area
  - Total: 1.59 km^{2} (0.61 sq mi)
- Elevation: 267 m (876 ft)

Population (2026-01-01)
  - Total: 74
  - Density: 47/km^{2} (120/sq mi)
- Time zone: UTC+1 (CET)
  - Summer (DST): UTC+2 (CEST)
- Postal code: 798 27
- Website: www.srbce.cz

Srbce is a municipality and village in Prostějov District in the Olomouc Region of the Czech Republic. It has about 70 inhabitants.

Srbce lies approximately 21 kilometres (13 mi) south-east of Prostějov, 33 km (21 mi) south of Olomouc, and 221 km (137 mi) south-east of Prague.

== Demographics ==
Historical population
| Year | Pop. | ±% |
|---|---|---|
| 1869 | 144 | — |
| 1880 | 166 | +15.3% |
| 1890 | 173 | +4.2% |
| 1900 | 177 | +2.3% |
| 1910 | 154 | −13.0% |
| 1921 | 159 | +3.2% |
| 1930 | 182 | +14.5% |
| 1950 | 121 | −33.5% |
| 1961 | 116 | −4.1% |
| 1970 | 98 | −15.5% |
| 1980 | 98 | +0.0% |
| 1991 | 81 | −17.3% |
| 2001 | 91 | +12.3% |
| 2011 | 81 | −11.0% |
| 2021 | 83 | +2.5% |
Source: Censuses
