= Rakůvka =

- Municipality
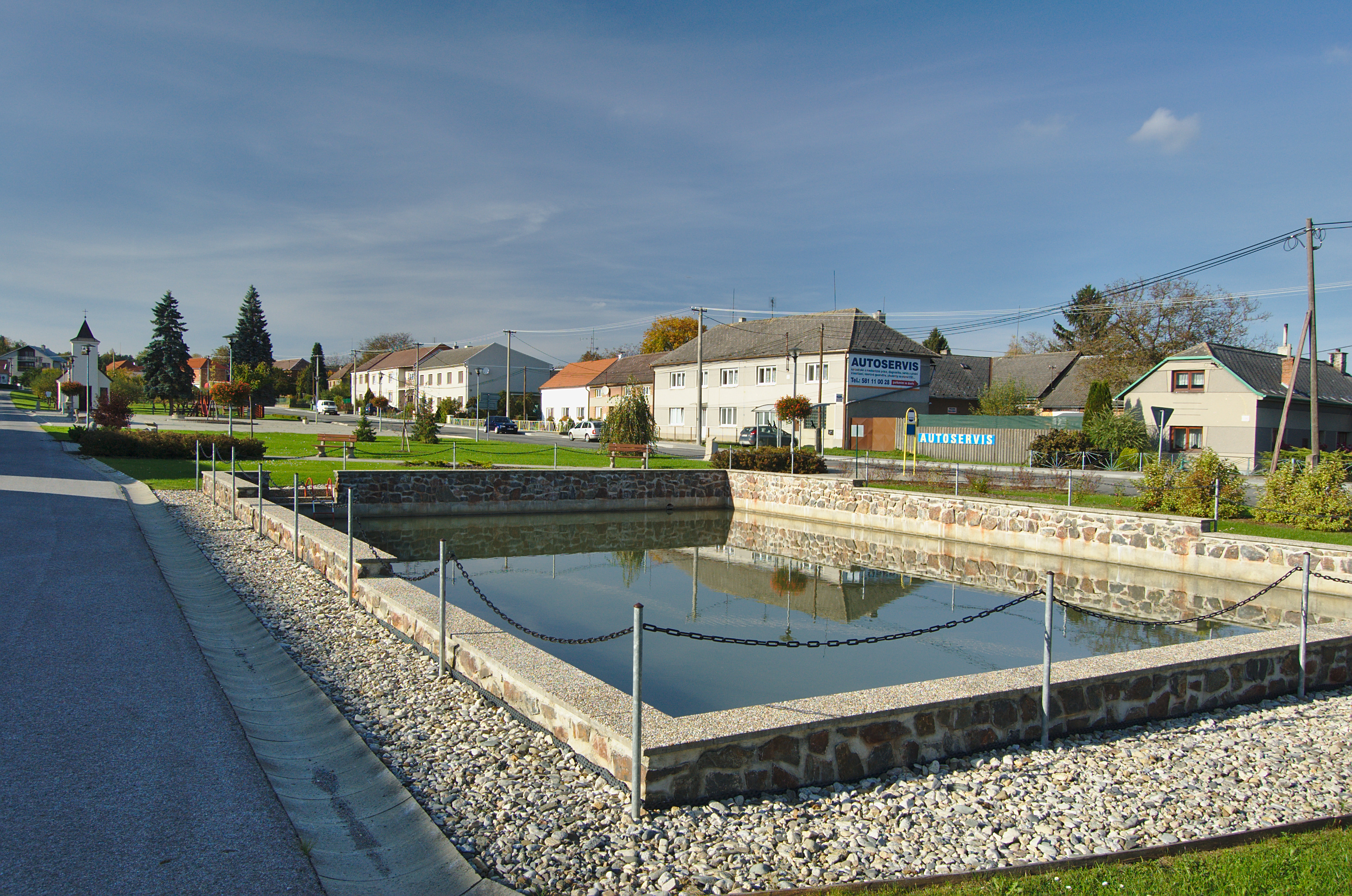
- Centre of Rakůvka

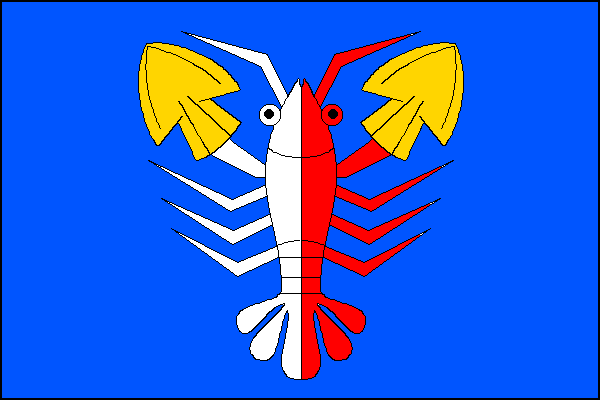
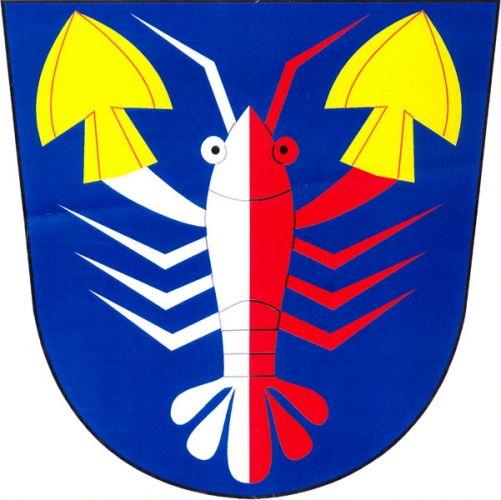
- Flag Coat of arms

- Location in the Czech Republic
- Coordinates: 49°36′35″N 16°56′15″E
- Country: Czech Republic
- Region: Olomouc
- District: Prostějov
- First mentioned: 1371

Area
  - Total: 2.89 km^{2} (1.12 sq mi)
- Elevation: 434 m (1,424 ft)

Population (2026-01-01)
  - Total: 112
  - Density: 38.8/km^{2} (100/sq mi)
- Time zone: UTC+1 (CET)
  - Summer (DST): UTC+2 (CEST)
- Postal code: 798 57
- Website: www.rakuvka.cz

Rakůvka is a municipality and village in Prostějov District in the Olomouc Region of the Czech Republic. It has about 100 inhabitants.

Rakůvka lies approximately 20 kilometres (12 mi) north-west of Prostějov, 23 km (14 mi) west of Olomouc, and 189 km (117 mi) east of Prague.

== Demographics ==
Historical population
| Year | Pop. | ±% |
|---|---|---|
| 1869 | 183 | — |
| 1880 | 199 | +8.7% |
| 1890 | 192 | −3.5% |
| 1900 | 221 | +15.1% |
| 1910 | 218 | −1.4% |
| 1921 | 222 | +1.8% |
| 1930 | 211 | −5.0% |
| 1950 | 167 | −20.9% |
| 1961 | 162 | −3.0% |
| 1970 | 135 | −16.7% |
| 1980 | 127 | −5.9% |
| 1991 | 118 | −7.1% |
| 2001 | 103 | −12.7% |
| 2011 | 96 | −6.8% |
| 2021 | 94 | −2.1% |
Source: Censuses
