= Ochoz =

- Municipality
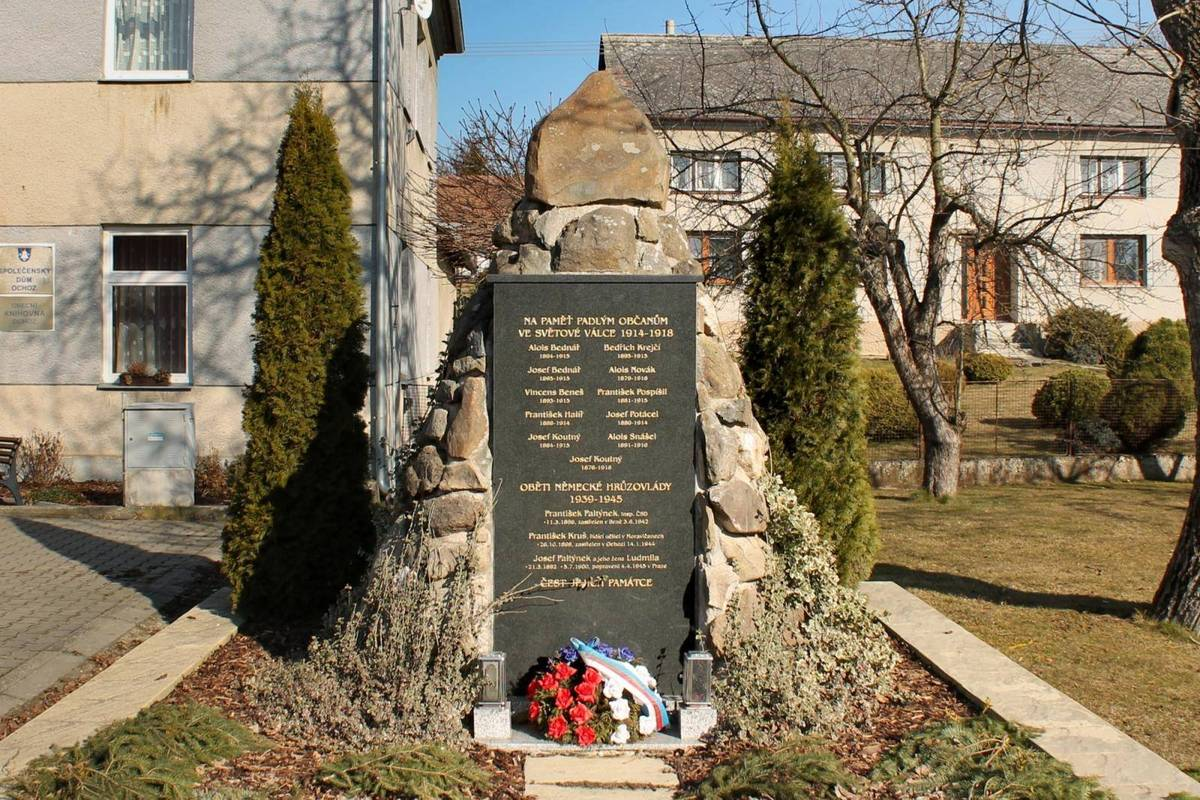
- Memorial to the Fallen

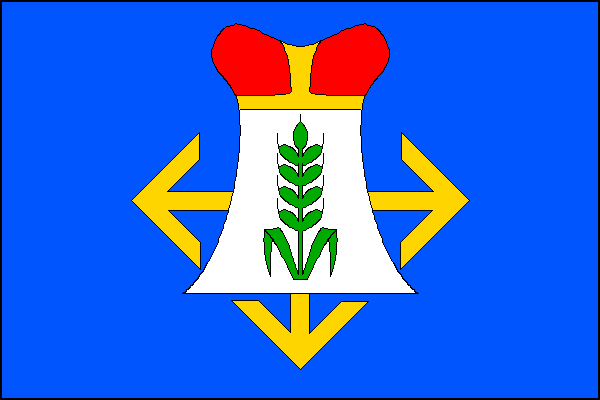
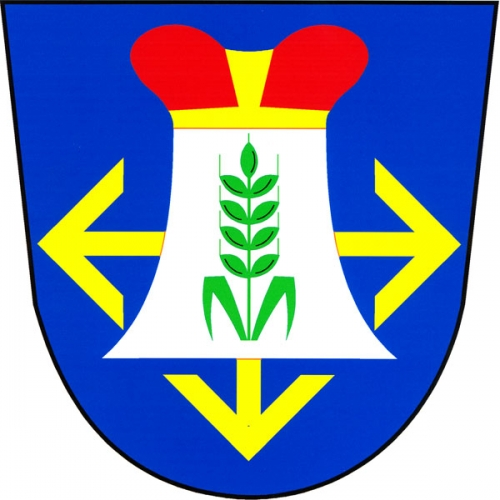
- Flag Coat of arms

- Location in the Czech Republic
- Coordinates: 49°36′0″N 16°54′54″E
- Country: Czech Republic
- Region: Olomouc
- District: Prostějov
- First mentioned: 1351

Area
  - Total: 3.30 km^{2} (1.27 sq mi)
- Elevation: 557 m (1,827 ft)

Population (2026-01-01)
  - Total: 198
  - Density: 60.0/km^{2} (155/sq mi)
- Time zone: UTC+1 (CET)
  - Summer (DST): UTC+2 (CEST)
- Postal code: 798 52
- Website: www.obecochoz.cz

Ochoz is a municipality and village in Prostějov District in the Olomouc Region of the Czech Republic. It has about 200 inhabitants.

Ochoz lies approximately 21 kilometres (13 mi) north-west of Prostějov, 25 km (16 mi) west of Olomouc, and 188 km (117 mi) east of Prague.

== Demographics ==
Historical population
| Year | Pop. | ±% |
|---|---|---|
| 1869 | 311 | — |
| 1880 | 292 | −6.1% |
| 1890 | 319 | +9.2% |
| 1900 | 316 | −0.9% |
| 1910 | 270 | −14.6% |
| 1921 | 271 | +0.4% |
| 1930 | 301 | +11.1% |
| 1950 | 236 | −21.6% |
| 1961 | 219 | −7.2% |
| 1970 | 215 | −1.8% |
| 1980 | 199 | −7.4% |
| 1991 | 216 | +8.5% |
| 2001 | 208 | −3.7% |
| 2011 | 196 | −5.8% |
| 2021 | 184 | −6.1% |
Source: Censuses
