= Hradčany-Kobeřice =

- Municipality
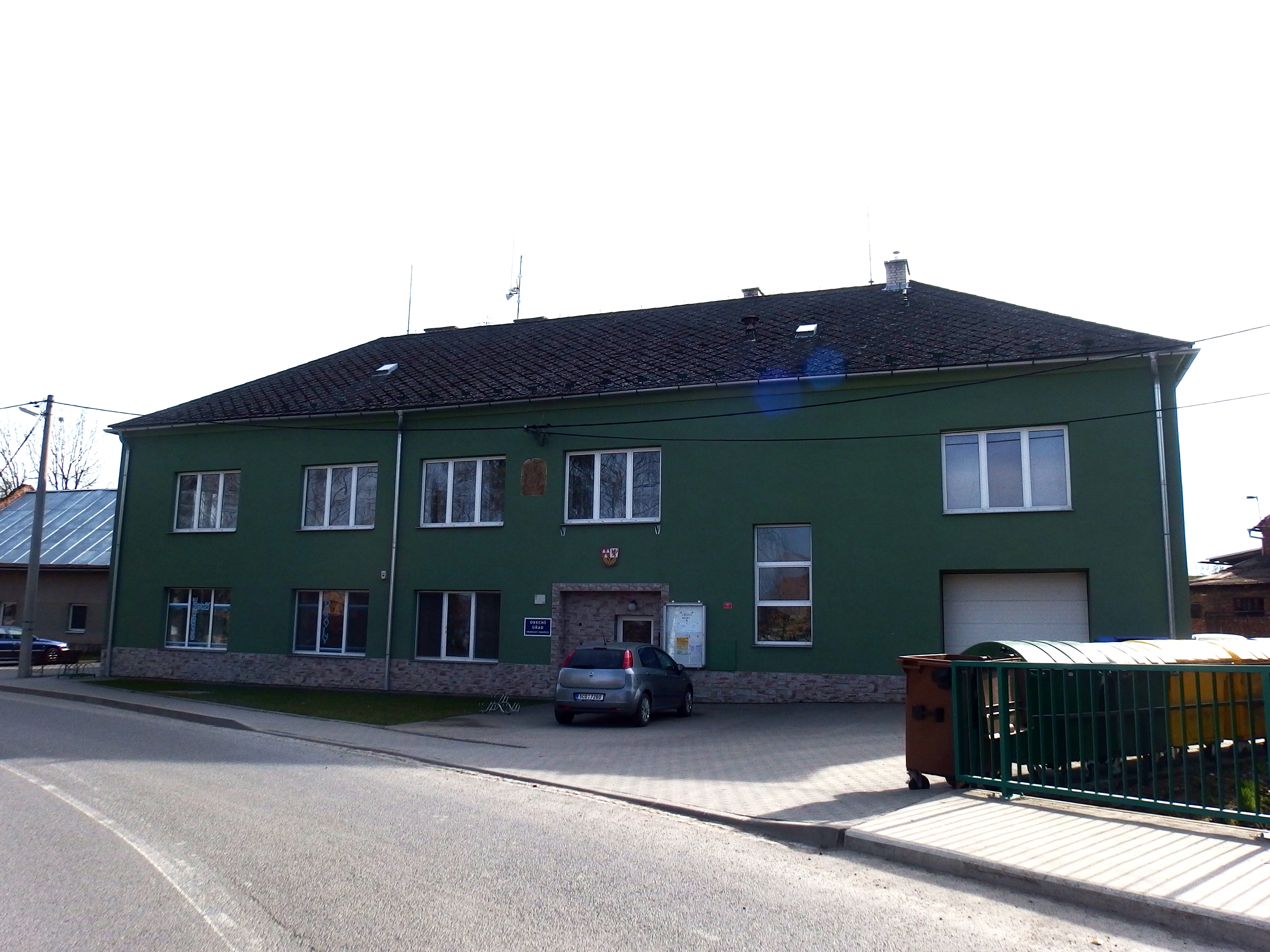
- Municipal office

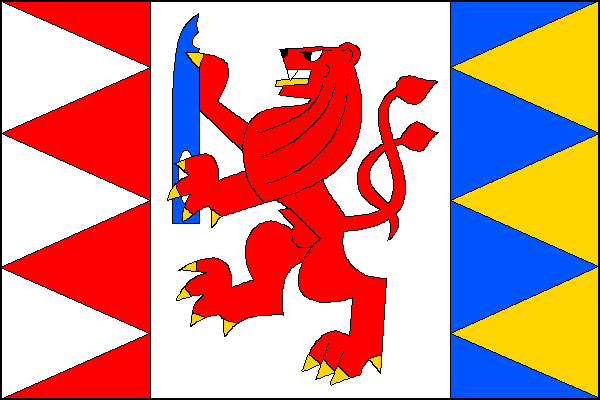
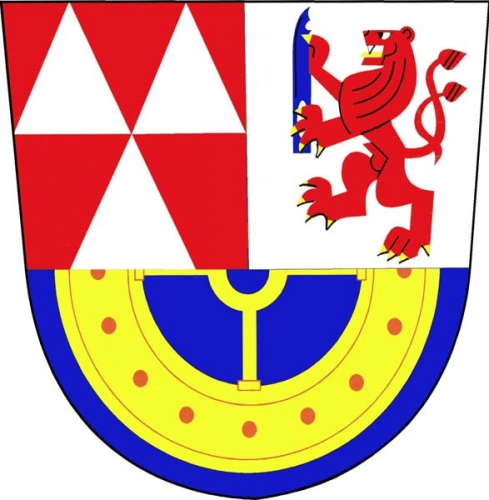
- Flag Coat of arms

- Location in the Czech Republic
- Coordinates: 49°21′51″N 17°7′45″E
- Country: Czech Republic
- Region: Olomouc
- District: Prostějov
- First mentioned: 1160

Area
  - Total: 6.91 km^{2} (2.67 sq mi)
- Elevation: 221 m (725 ft)

Population (2026-01-01)
  - Total: 408
  - Density: 59.0/km^{2} (153/sq mi)
- Time zone: UTC+1 (CET)
  - Summer (DST): UTC+2 (CEST)
- Postal code: 798 07
- Website: www.hradcany-koberice.cz

Hradčany-Kobeřice is a municipality in Prostějov District in the Olomouc Region of the Czech Republic. It has about 400 inhabitants.

Hradčany-Kobeřice lies approximately 12 kilometres (7 mi) south of Prostějov, 27 km (17 mi) south of Olomouc, and 210 km (130 mi) east of Prague.

== Administrative division ==
Hradčany-Kobeřice consists of two municipal parts (in brackets population according to the 2021 census):

- Hradčany (221)
- Kobeřice (171)

== Demographics ==
Historical population
| Year | Pop. | ±% |
|---|---|---|
| 1869 | 715 | — |
| 1880 | 745 | +4.2% |
| 1890 | 766 | +2.8% |
| 1900 | 730 | −4.7% |
| 1910 | 810 | +11.0% |
| 1921 | 739 | −8.8% |
| 1930 | 810 | +9.6% |
| 1950 | 628 | −22.5% |
| 1961 | 625 | −0.5% |
| 1970 | 554 | −11.4% |
| 1980 | 432 | −22.0% |
| 1991 | 358 | −17.1% |
| 2001 | 410 | +14.5% |
| 2011 | 435 | +6.1% |
| 2021 | 392 | −9.9% |
Source: Censuses
