= Polomí =

- Municipality
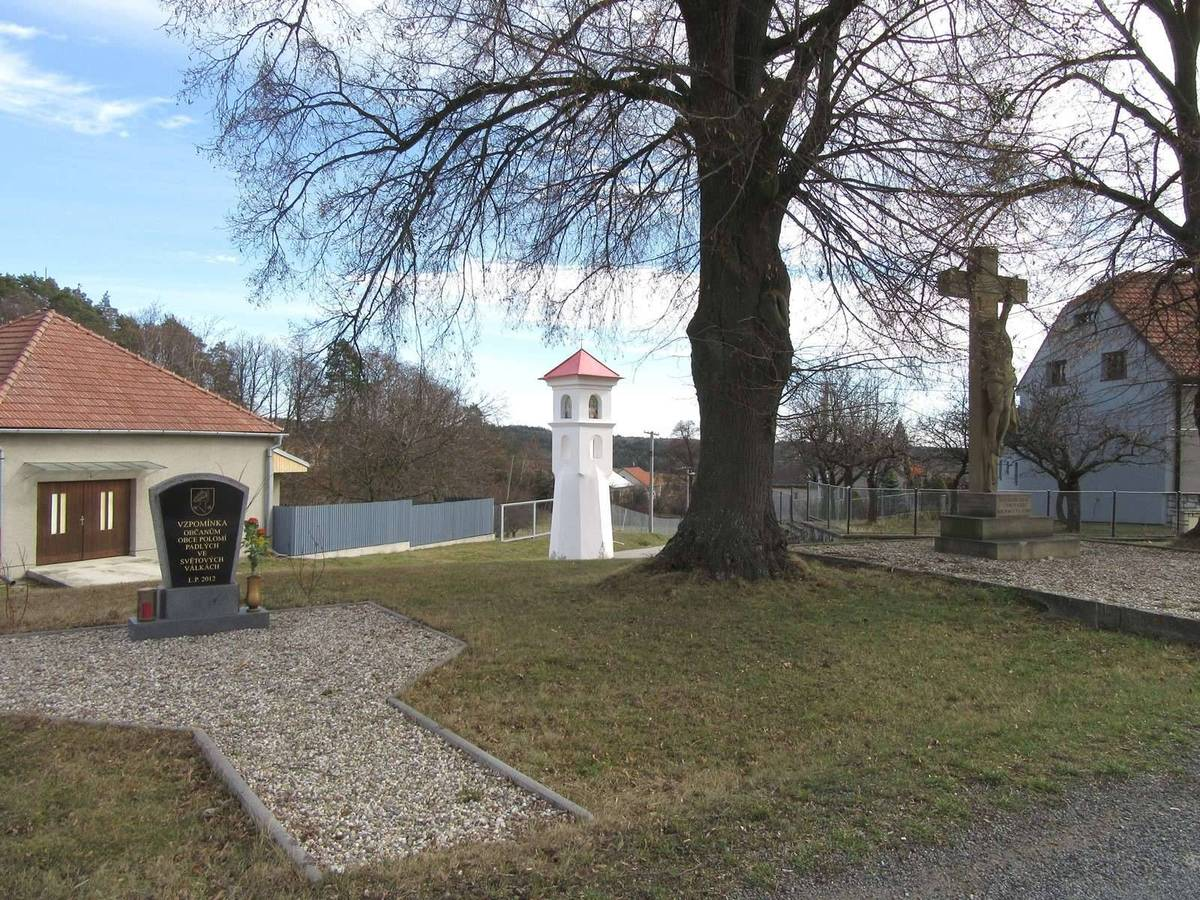
- Memorial to the Victims of the World Wars, wayside shride and crucifix

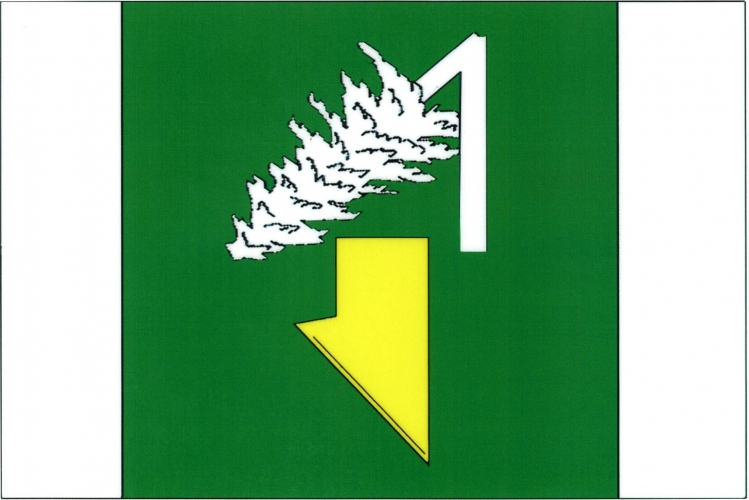
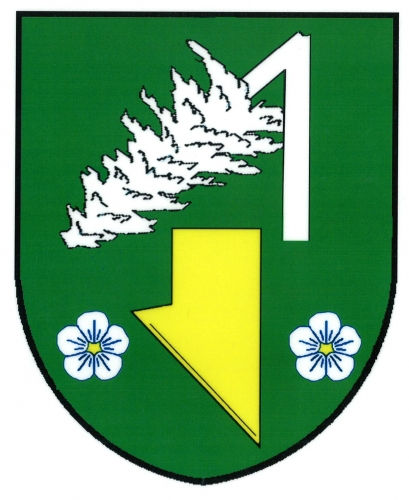
- Flag Coat of arms

- Location in the Czech Republic
- Coordinates: 49°37′53″N 16°56′58″E
- Country: Czech Republic
- Region: Olomouc
- District: Prostějov
- First mentioned: 1301

Area
  - Total: 2.90 km^{2} (1.12 sq mi)
- Elevation: 455 m (1,493 ft)

Population (2026-01-01)
  - Total: 135
  - Density: 46.6/km^{2} (121/sq mi)
- Time zone: UTC+1 (CET)
  - Summer (DST): UTC+2 (CEST)
- Postal code: 798 55
- Website: www.polomi.cz

Polomí is a municipality and village in Prostějov District in the Olomouc Region of the Czech Republic. It has about 100 inhabitants.

Polomí lies approximately 22 kilometres (14 mi) north-west of Prostějov, 23 km (14 mi) west of Olomouc, and 189 km (117 mi) east of Prague.

== Demographics ==
Historical population
Year	Pop.	±%
1869	299	—
1880	289	−3.3%
1890	284	−1.7%
1900	298	+4.9%
1910	297	−0.3%
1921	309	+4.0%
1930	318	+2.9%
1950	229	−28.0%
1961	244	+6.6%
1970	208	−14.8%
1980	178	−14.4%
1991	156	−12.4%
2001	152	−2.6%
2011	142	−6.6%
2021	138	−2.8%
Source: Censuses
