= Otinoves =

- Municipality
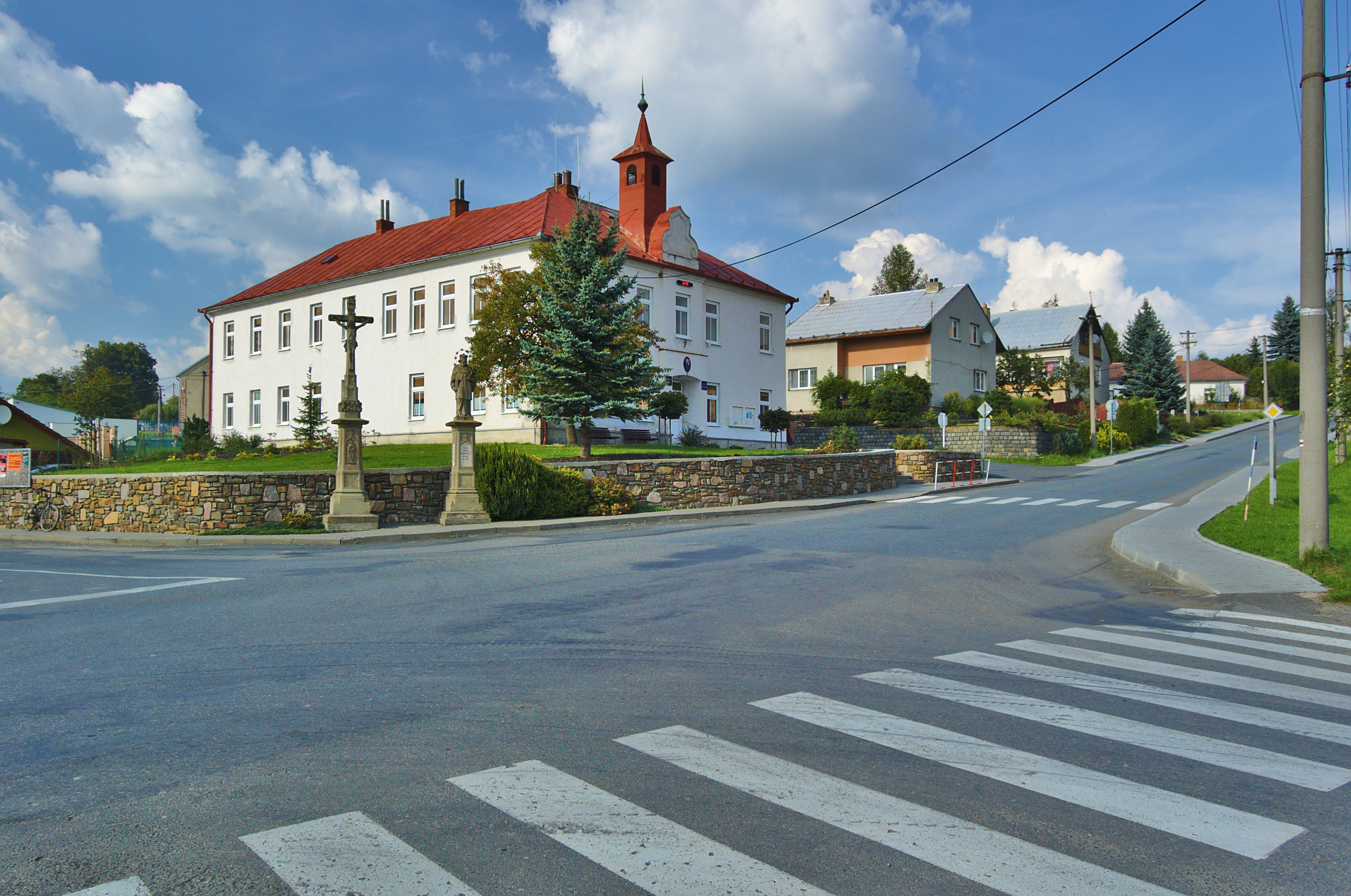
- Municipal office

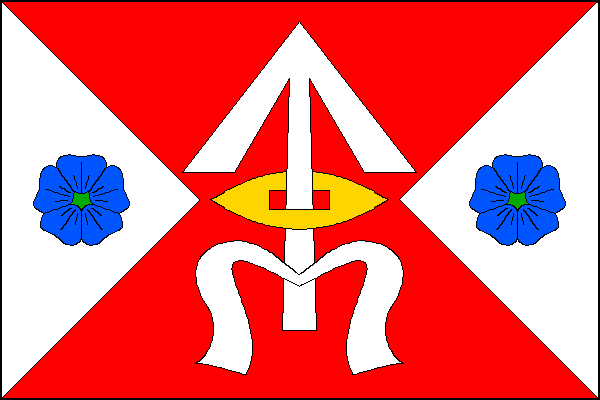
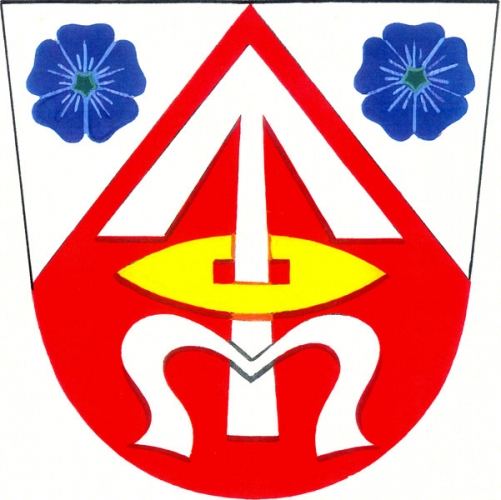
- Flag Coat of arms

- Location in the Czech Republic
- Coordinates: 49°25′16″N 16°52′18″E
- Country: Czech Republic
- Region: Olomouc
- District: Prostějov
- First mentioned: 1347

Area
  - Total: 9.52 km^{2} (3.68 sq mi)
- Elevation: 576 m (1,890 ft)

Population (2026-01-01)
  - Total: 296
  - Density: 31.1/km^{2} (80.5/sq mi)
- Time zone: UTC+1 (CET)
  - Summer (DST): UTC+2 (CEST)
- Postal code: 798 61
- Website: www.obecotinoves.cz

Otinoves is a municipality and village in Prostějov District in the Olomouc Region of the Czech Republic. It has about 300 inhabitants.

Otinoves lies approximately 19 kilometres (12 mi) west of Prostějov, 35 km (22 mi) south-west of Olomouc, and 192 km (119 mi) south-east of Prague.

== Demographics ==
Historical population
Year	Pop.	±%
1869	1,225	—
1880	1,252	+2.2%
1890	1,235	−1.4%
1900	1,312	+6.2%
1910	1,347	+2.7%
1921	1,226	−9.0%
1930	1,138	−7.2%
1950	517	−54.6%
1961	504	−2.5%
1970	442	−12.3%
1980	390	−11.8%
1991	323	−17.2%
2001	296	−8.4%
2011	292	−1.4%
2021	258	−11.6%
Source: Censuses
