= Niva (Prostějov District) =

- Municipality
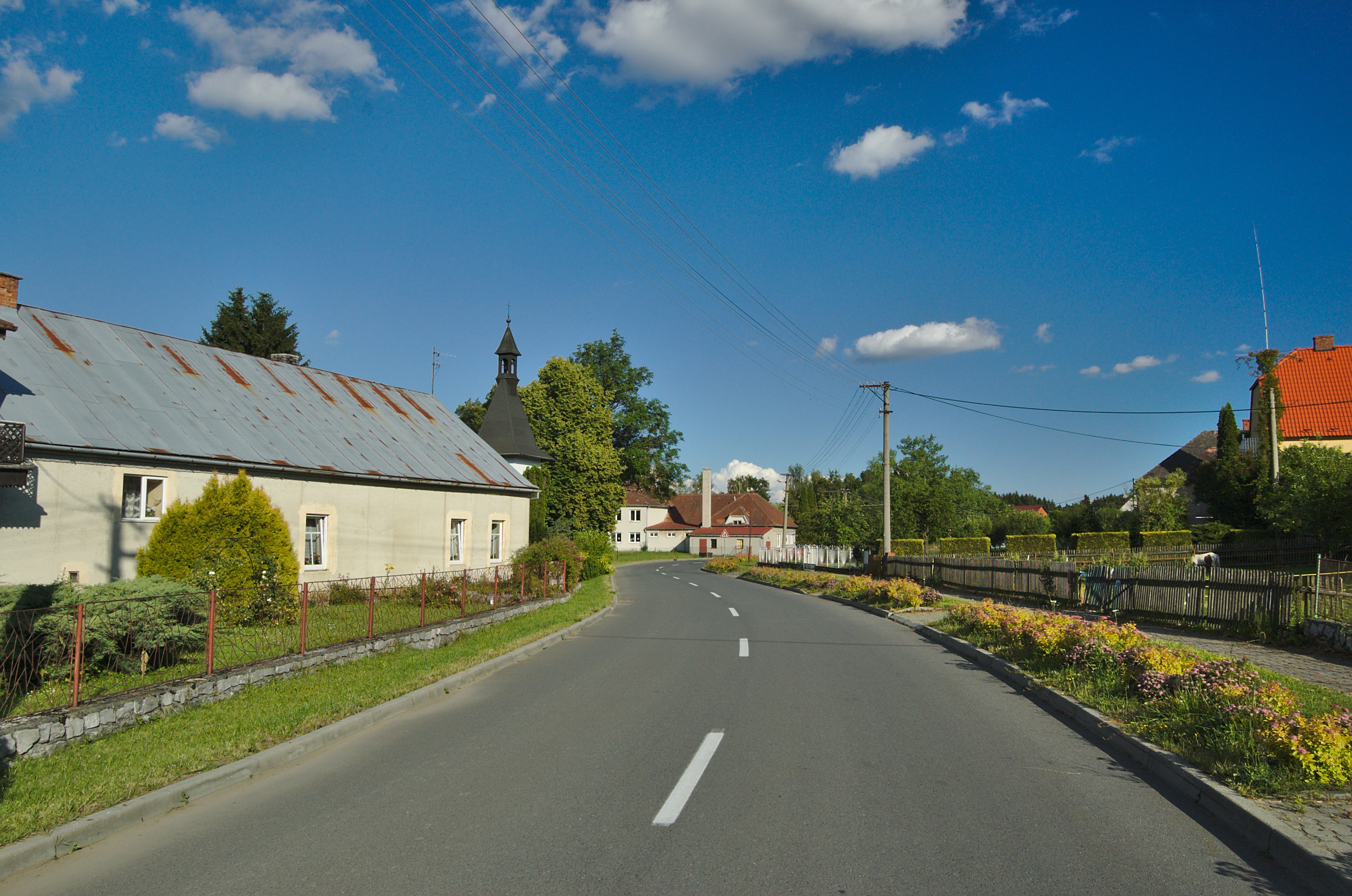
- Main street

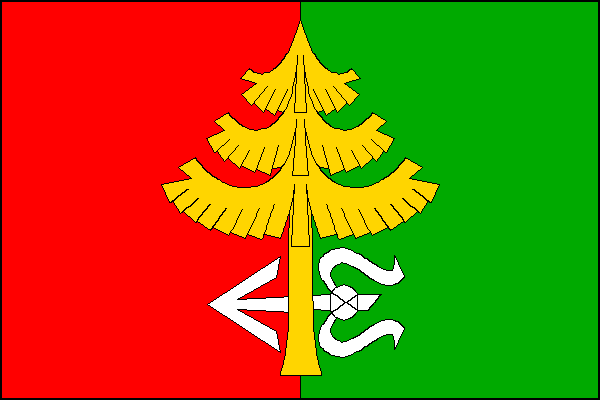
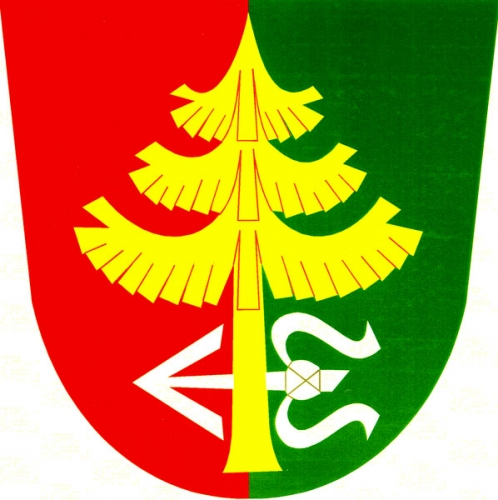
- Flag Coat of arms

- Location in the Czech Republic
- Coordinates: 49°26′43″N 16°51′7″E
- Country: Czech Republic
- Region: Olomouc
- District: Prostějov
- First mentioned: 1347

Area
  - Total: 13.39 km^{2} (5.17 sq mi)
- Elevation: 556 m (1,824 ft)

Population (2026-01-01)
  - Total: 331
  - Density: 24.7/km^{2} (64.0/sq mi)
- Time zone: UTC+1 (CET)
  - Summer (DST): UTC+2 (CEST)
- Postal code: 798 61
- Website: www.obecniva.cz

Niva (until 1949 Hartmanice; German: Hartmanitz) is a municipality and village in Prostějov District in the Olomouc Region of the Czech Republic. It has about 300 inhabitants.

Niva lies approximately 20 kilometres (12 mi) west of Prostějov, 34 km (21 mi) south-west of Olomouc, and 189 km (117 mi) east of Prague.

== Demographics ==
Historical population
Year	Pop.	±%
1869	833	—
1880	924	+10.9%
1890	911	−1.4%
1900	950	+4.3%
1910	953	+0.3%
1921	977	+2.5%
1930	920	−5.8%
1950	384	−58.3%
1961	465	+21.1%
1970	427	−8.2%
1980	448	+4.9%
1991	391	−12.7%
2001	363	−7.2%
2011	331	−8.8%
2021	326	−1.5%
Source: Censuses
