= Krumsín =

- Municipality
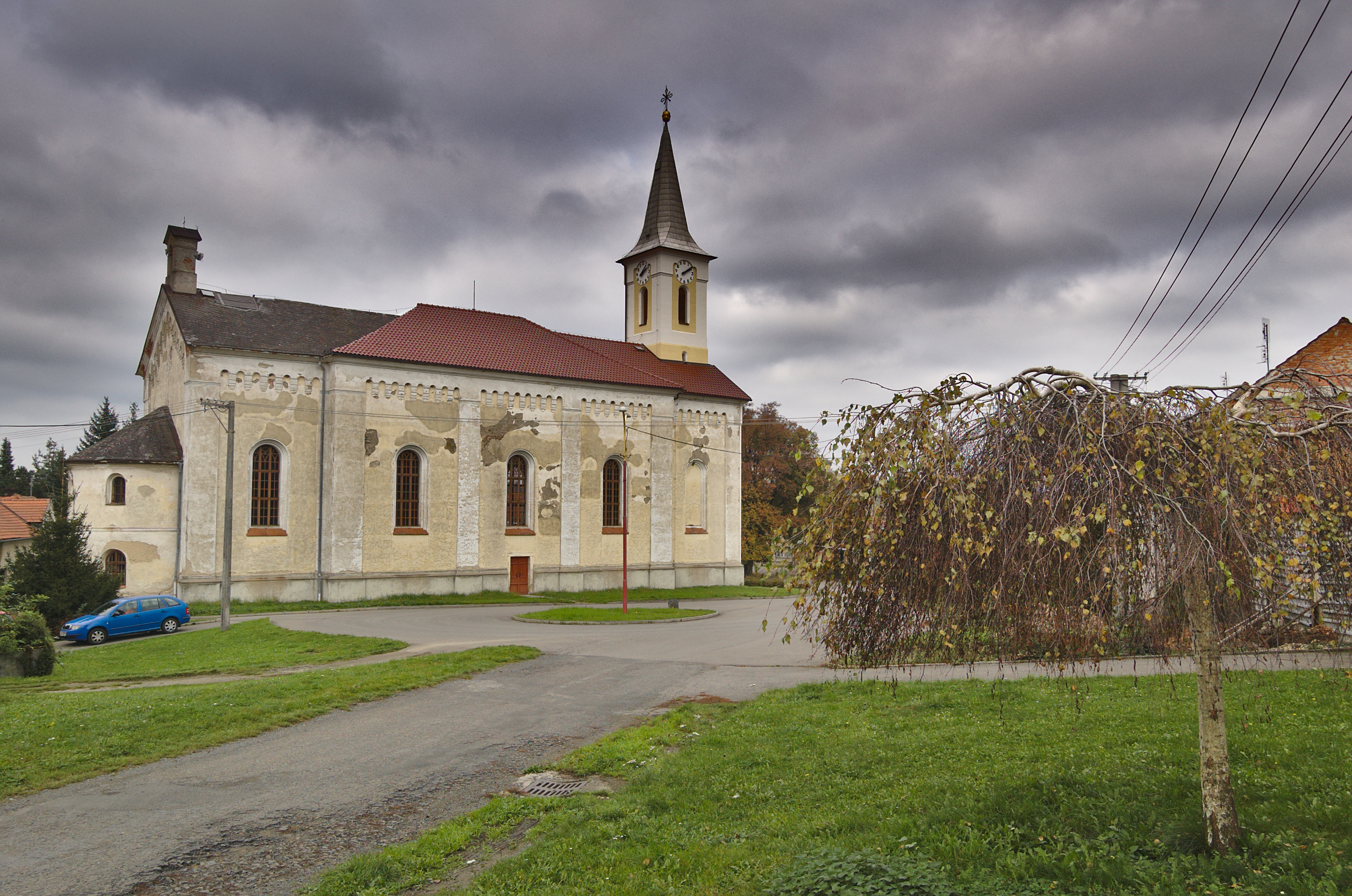
- Church of Saint Bartholomew

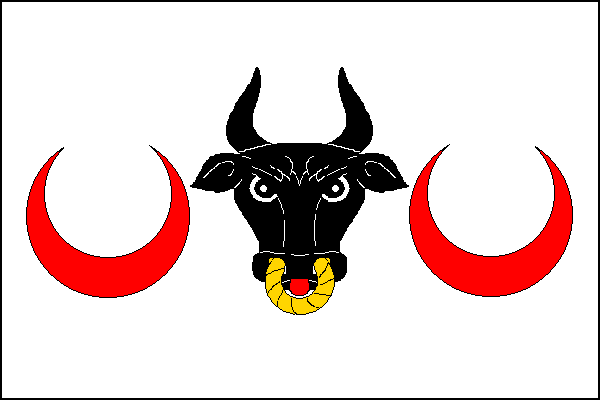
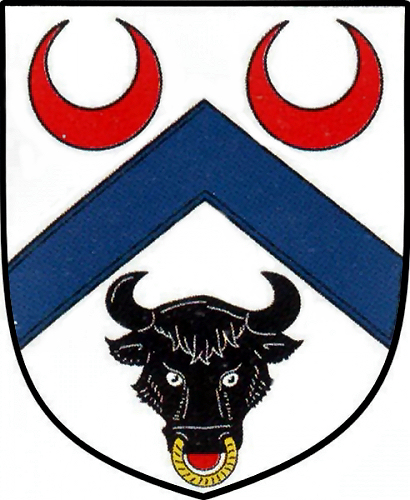
- Flag Coat of arms

- Location in the Czech Republic
- Coordinates: 49°26′45″N 17°0′5″E
- Country: Czech Republic
- Region: Olomouc
- District: Prostějov
- First mentioned: 1349

Area
  - Total: 6.22 km^{2} (2.40 sq mi)
- Elevation: 312 m (1,024 ft)

Population (2026-01-01)
  - Total: 598
  - Density: 96.1/km^{2} (249/sq mi)
- Time zone: UTC+1 (CET)
  - Summer (DST): UTC+2 (CEST)
- Postal code: 798 03
- Website: www.krumsin.cz

Krumsín is a municipality and village in Prostějov District in the Olomouc Region of the Czech Republic. It has about 600 inhabitants.

Krumsín lies approximately 9 kilometres (6 mi) west of Prostějov, 25 km (16 mi) south-west of Olomouc, and 199 km (124 mi) east of Prague.

== Demographics ==
Historical population
Year	Pop.	±%
1869	493	—
1880	581	+17.8%
1890	648	+11.5%
1900	656	+1.2%
1910	648	−1.2%
1921	608	−6.2%
1930	671	+10.4%
1950	730	+8.8%
1961	709	−2.9%
1970	693	−2.3%
1980	676	−2.5%
1991	633	−6.4%
2001	645	+1.9%
2011	573	−11.2%
2021	545	−4.9%
Source: Censuses
