= Prostějov District =

Prostějov District Okres Prostějov
- District
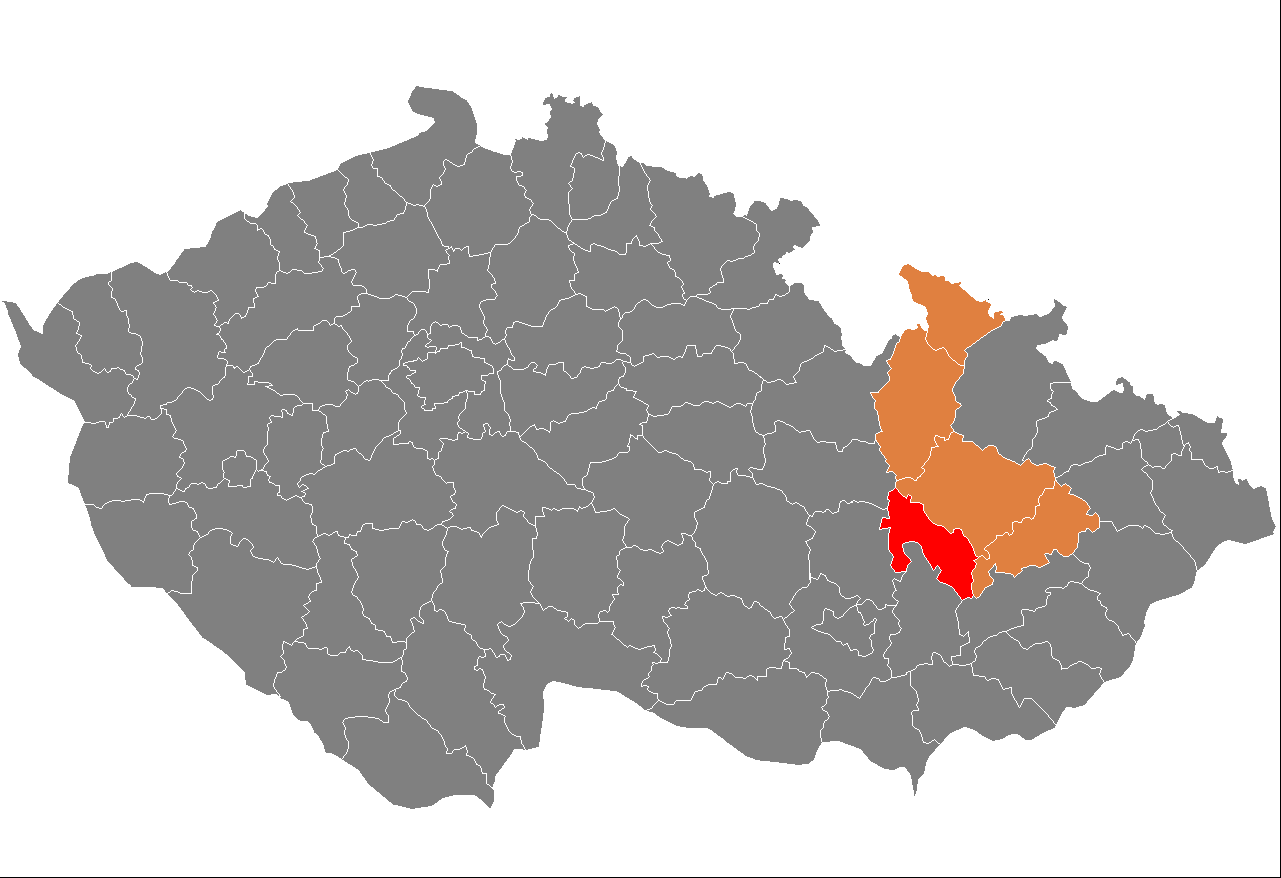
- Location in the Olomouc Region within the Czech Republic
- Coordinates: 49°30′N 17°6′E
- Country: Czech Republic
- Region: Olomouc
- Capital: Prostějov

Area
  - Total: 777.09 km^{2} (300.04 sq mi)

Population (2026)
  - Total: 108,873
  - Density: 140.10/km^{2} (362.87/sq mi)
- Time zone: UTC+1 (CET)
  - Summer (DST): UTC+2 (CEST)
- Municipalities: 97
- * Cities and towns: 5
- * Market towns: 6

Prostějov District (Czech: okres Prostějov) is a district in the Olomouc Region of the Czech Republic. Its capital is the city of Prostějov.

== Administrative division ==
Prostějov District is divided into two administrative districts of municipalities with extended competence: Prostějov and Konice.

=== List of municipalities ===
Cities and towns are marked in bold and market towns in italics:

Alojzov – Bedihošť – Bílovice-Lutotín – Biskupice – Bohuslavice – Bousín – Březsko – Brodek u Konice – Brodek u Prostějova – Budětsko – Buková – Čechy pod Kosířem – Čehovice – Čelčice – Čelechovice na Hané – Dětkovice – Dobrochov – Dobromilice – Doloplazy – Drahany – Dřevnovice – Držovice – Dzbel – Hačky – Hluchov – Horní Štěpánov – Hradčany-Kobeřice – Hrdibořice – Hrubčice – Hruška – Hvozd – Ivaň – Jesenec – Kladky – Klenovice na Hané – Klopotovice – Konice – Kostelec na Hané – Koválovice-Osíčany – Kralice na Hané – Krumsín – Laškov – Lešany – Lipová – Ludmírov – Malé Hradisko – Mořice – Mostkovice – Myslejovice – Němčice nad Hanou – Nezamyslice – Niva – Obědkovice – Ochoz – Ohrozim – Olšany u Prostějova – Ondratice – Otaslavice – Otinoves – Pavlovice u Kojetína – Pěnčín – Pivín – Plumlov – Polomí – Přemyslovice – Prostějov – Prostějovičky – Protivanov – Ptení – Raková u Konice – Rakůvka – Rozstání – Seloutky – Skalka – Skřípov – Slatinky – Smržice – Srbce – Stařechovice – Stínava – Stražisko – Šubířov – Suchdol – Tištín – Tvorovice – Určice – Víceměřice – Vícov – Vincencov – Vitčice – Vranovice-Kelčice – Vrbátky – Vrchoslavice – Vřesovice – Výšovice – Zdětín – Želeč

== Geography ==
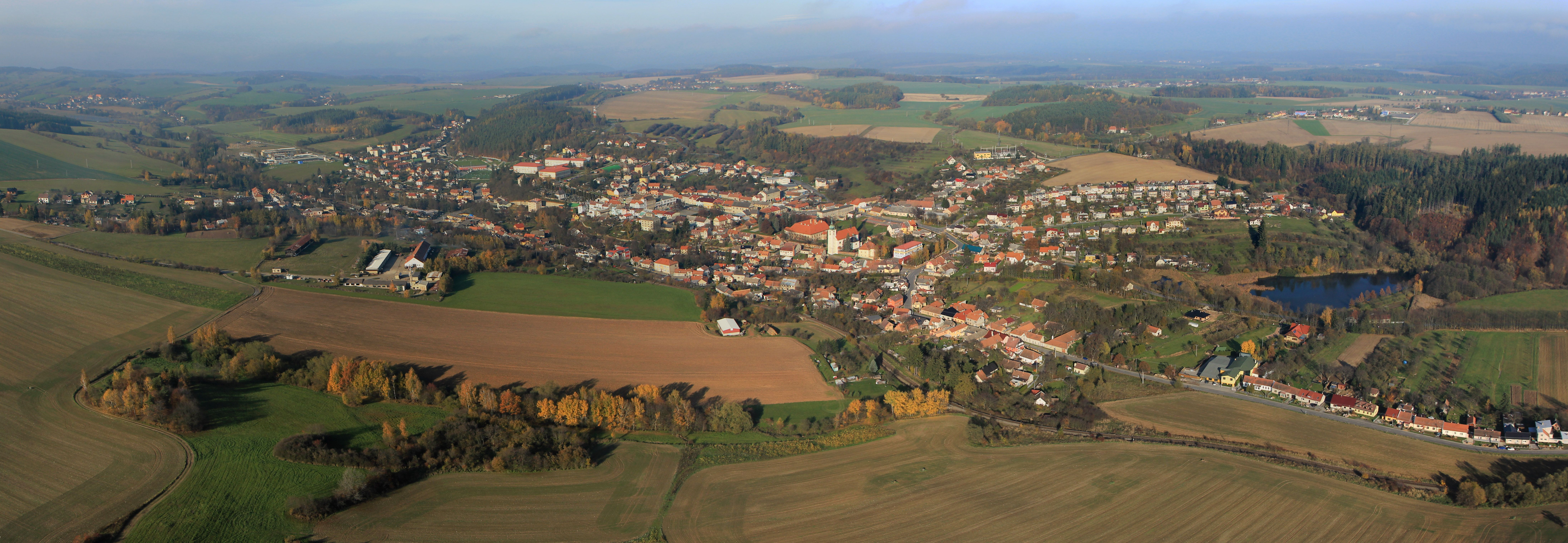
Konice and surrounding landscape

The landscape is varied and rugged. The terrain is flat in the southeast and hilly in the northwest. The territory extends into five geomorphological mesoregions: Drahany Highlands (west), Upper Morava Valley (east), Zábřeh Highlands (north), Vyškov Gate (south), and Litenčice Hills (south). The highest point of the district is the hill Skalky in Buková with an elevation of 735 m (2,411 ft), the lowest point is a meadow in Ivaň at 196 m (643 ft).

From the total district area of 777.1 km^{2} (300.0 sq mi), agricultural land occupies 531.9 km^{2} (205.4 sq mi), forests occupy 157.1 km^{2} (60.7 sq mi), and water area occupies 7.4 km^{2} (2.9 sq mi). Forests cover 20.2% of the district's area.

There are no major rivers. The longest river is the Romže, which originates here and flows across the territory to the southeast. The Haná crosses the district in its southern part. The district is poor in bodies of water. The only notable body of water is the Plumlov Reservoir.

There are no large-scale protected areas.

== Demographics ==
Historical population

Year	Pop.	±%
1869	95,579	—
1880	104,082	+8.9%
1890	109,575	+5.3%
1900	115,477	+5.4%
1910	126,350	+9.4%

Year	Pop.	±%
1921	125,190	−0.9%
1930	129,780	+3.7%
1950	116,006	−10.6%
1961	118,752	+2.4%
1970	114,099	−3.9%

Year	Pop.	±%
1980	116,199	+1.8%
1991	112,208	−3.4%
2001	109,896	−2.1%
2011	107,862	−1.9%
2021	106,358	−1.4%

Source: Censuses

=== Most populous municipalities ===
Name	Population	Area (km^{2})
Prostějov	43,236	39
Kostelec na Hané	2,857	14
Konice	2,620	24
Plumlov	2,271	12
Němčice nad Hanou	1,902	12
Olšany u Prostějova	1,868	11
Vrbátky	1,728	13
Držovice	1,726	8
Kralice na Hané	1,707	13
Smržice	1,667	13

== Economy ==
The largest employers with headquarters in Prostějov District and at least 500 employees are:

Economic entity	Location	Number of employees	Main activity
AGEL Středomoravská nemocniční	Prostějov	3,000–3,999	Health care
Makovec	Prostějov	1,000–1,499	Processing of meat
Mubea Stabilizer Bar Systems	Prostějov	1,000–1,499	Manufacture of anti-roll bars for motor vehicles
Windmöller & Hölscher Machinery	Kralice na Hané	500–999	Manufacture of plastics and rubber machinery
Mubea IT Spring Wire	Prostějov	500–999	Manufacture of springs for motor vehicles

== Transport ==
The D1 motorway from Brno to Ostrava passes through the southern part of the district. The D46 motorway (part of the European route E462) separates from the D1 and leads from Vyškov to Olomouc across the district.

== Sights ==
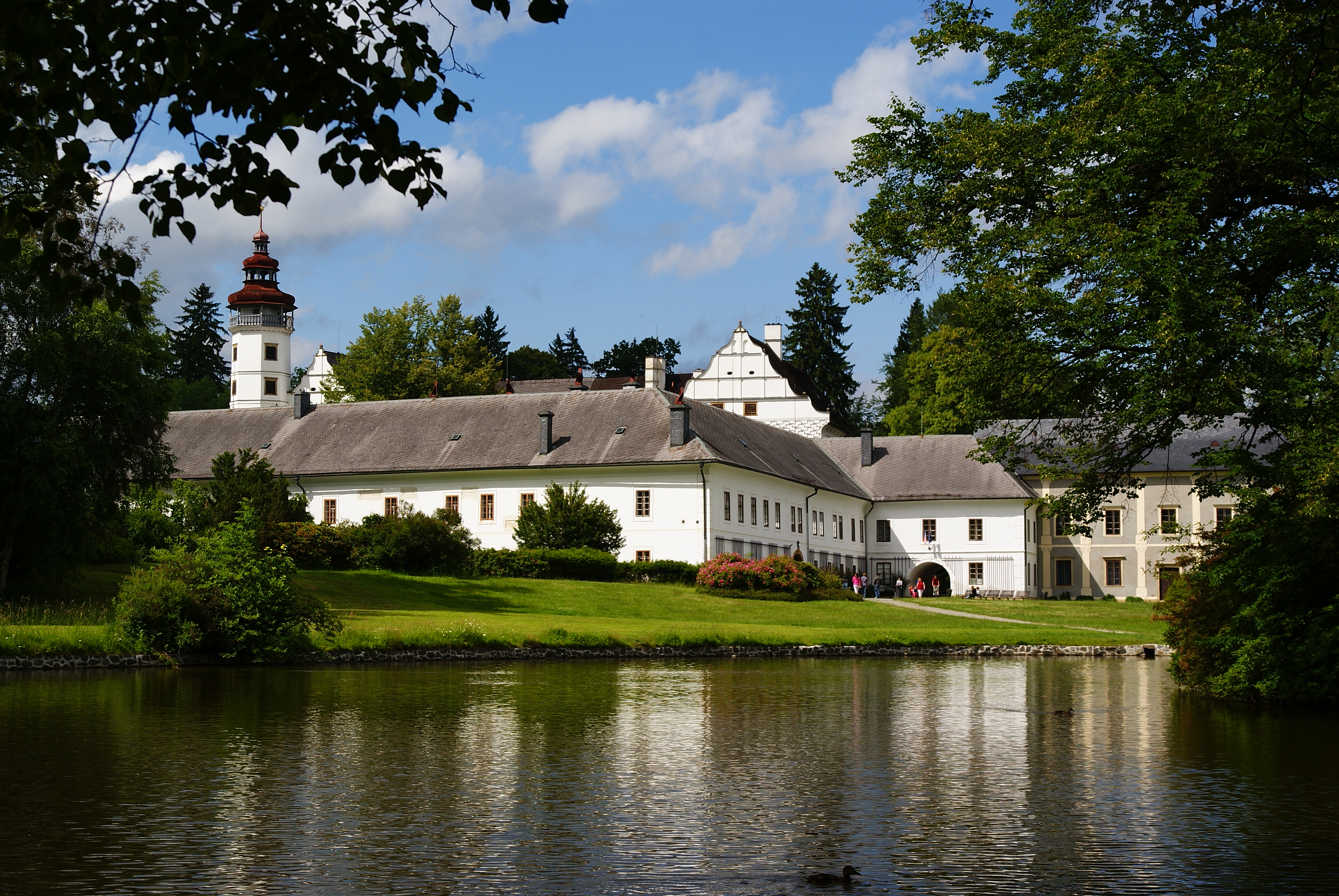
Velké Losiny Castle

The most important monuments in the district, protected as national cultural monuments, are:

- National House in Prostějov
- Plumlov Castle
- Prostějov City Hall

The best-preserved settlement and the only one protected as a monument zone is Prostějov.

There are no major tourist destinations. The most visited tourist destination is the Museum and Art Gallery in Prostějov.
