= Buková (Prostějov District) =

- Municipality
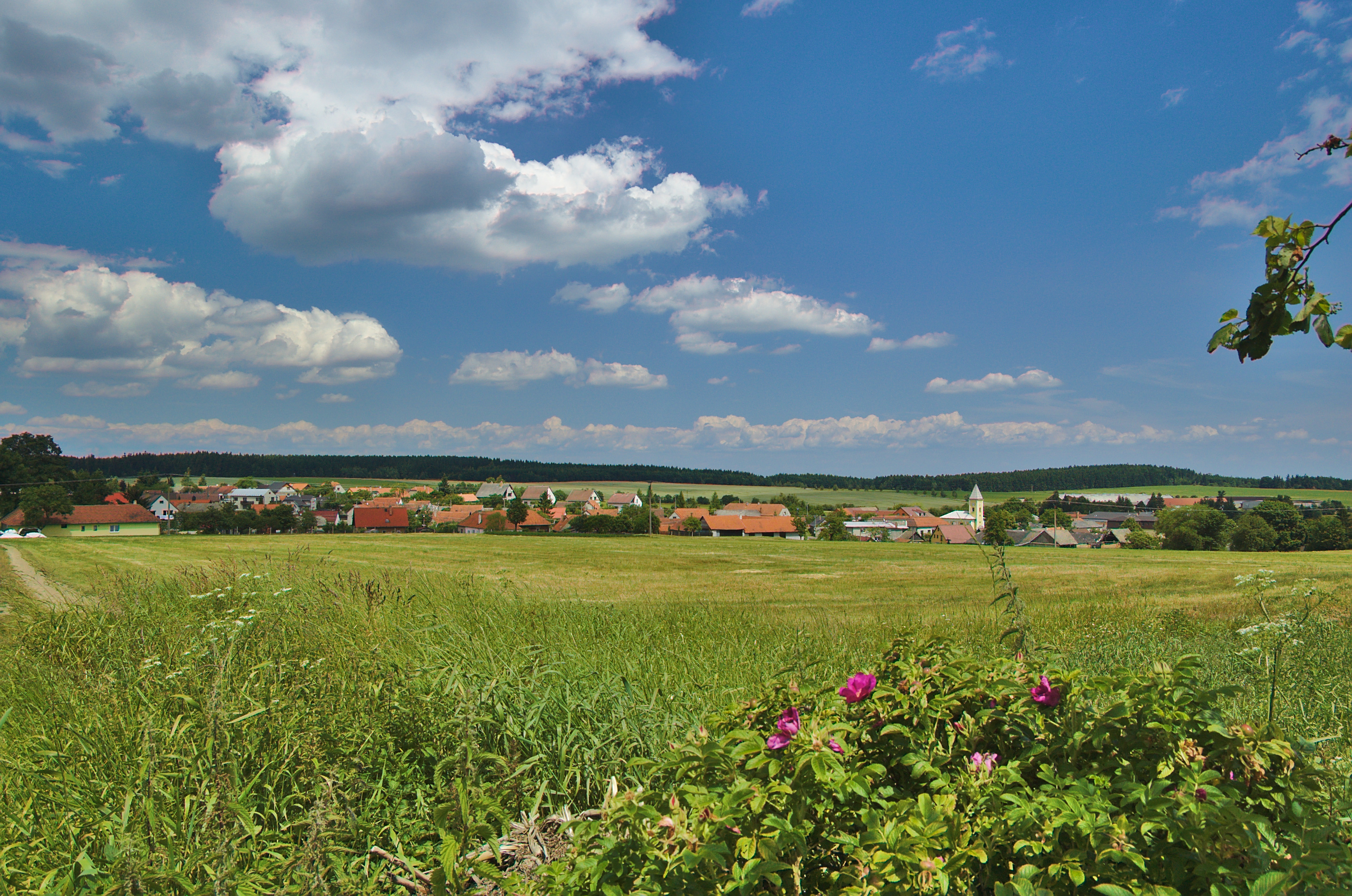
- View from the southwest

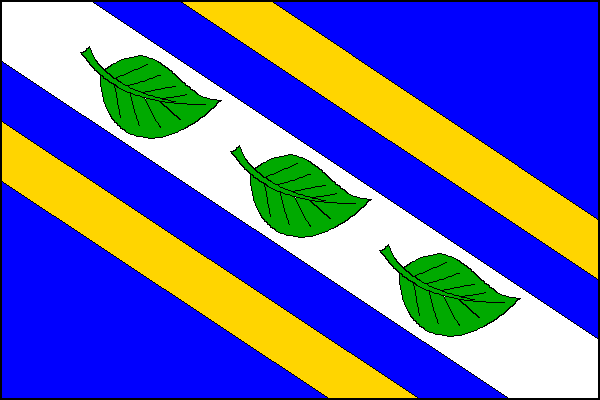
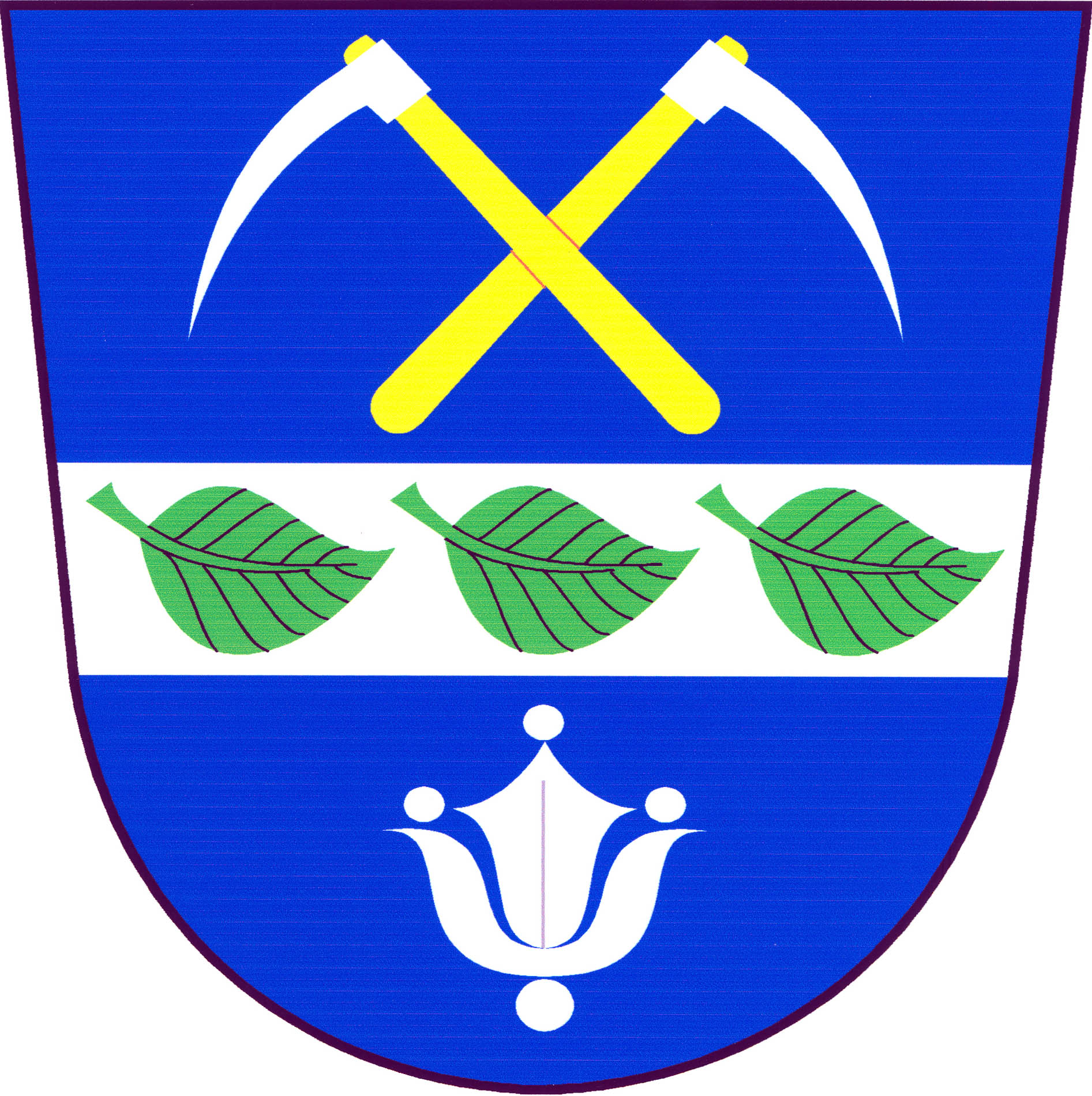
- Flag Coat of arms

- Location in the Czech Republic
- Coordinates: 49°30′35″N 16°49′45″E
- Country: Czech Republic
- Region: Olomouc
- District: Prostějov
- First mentioned: 1378

Area
  - Total: 17.43 km^{2} (6.73 sq mi)
- Elevation: 628 m (2,060 ft)

Population (2026-01-01)
  - Total: 278
  - Density: 15.9/km^{2} (41.3/sq mi)
- Time zone: UTC+1 (CET)
  - Summer (DST): UTC+2 (CEST)
- Postal code: 798 48
- Website: www.bukova.eu

Buková is a municipality and village in Prostějov District in the Olomouc Region of the Czech Republic. It has about 300 inhabitants.

Buková lies approximately 21 kilometres (13 mi) west of Prostějov, 32 km (20 mi) west of Olomouc, and 185 km (115 mi) east of Prague.

== Demographics ==
Historical population
Year	Pop.	±%
1869	697	—
1880	745	+6.9%
1890	721	−3.2%
1900	691	−4.2%
1910	693	+0.3%
1921	654	−5.6%
1930	646	−1.2%
1950	510	−21.1%
1961	534	+4.7%
1970	504	−5.6%
1980	416	−17.5%
1991	358	−13.9%
2001	350	−2.2%
2011	317	−9.4%
2021	285	−10.1%
Source: Censuses
