= Ondratice =

- Municipality
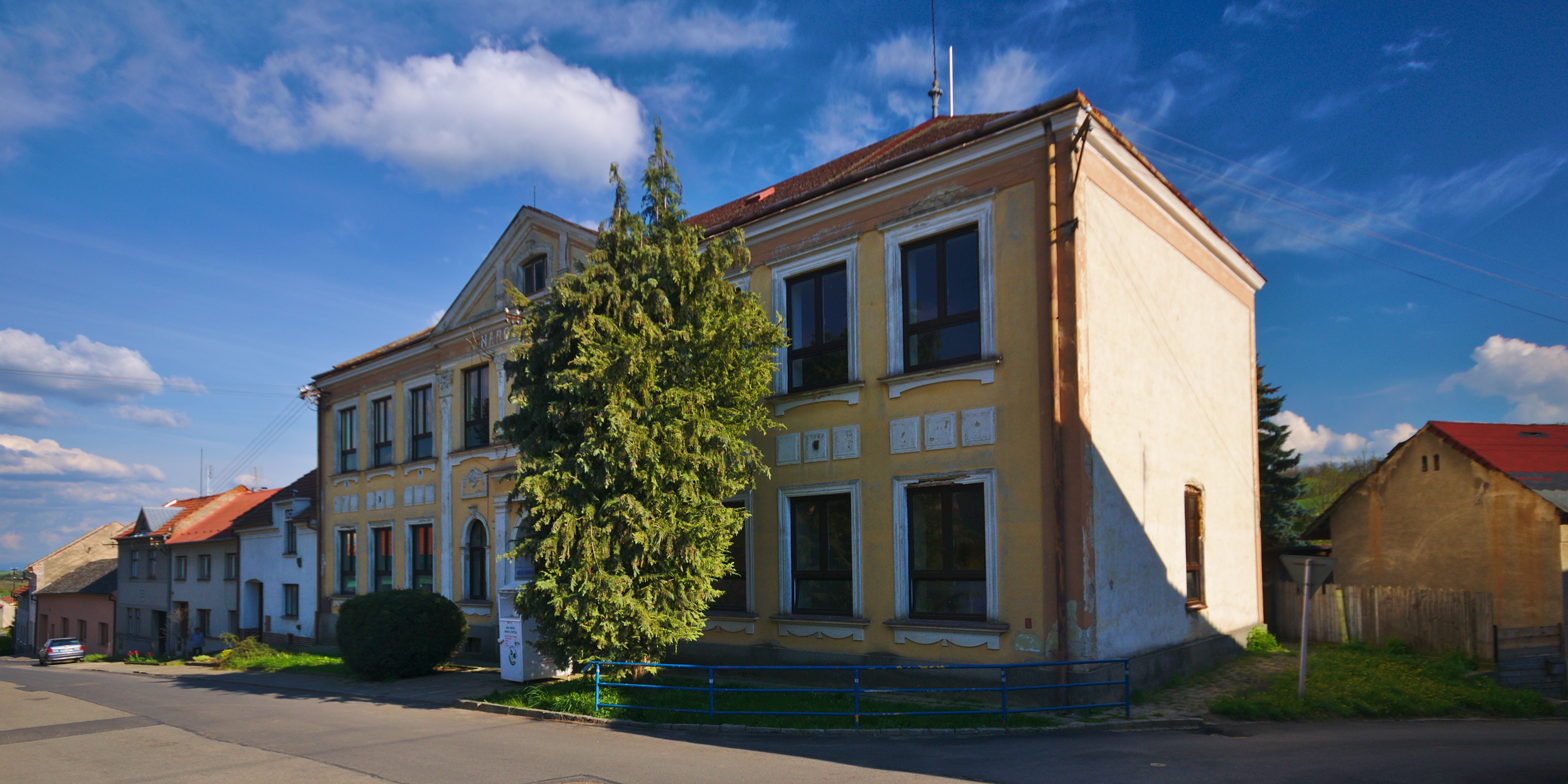
- Municipal office

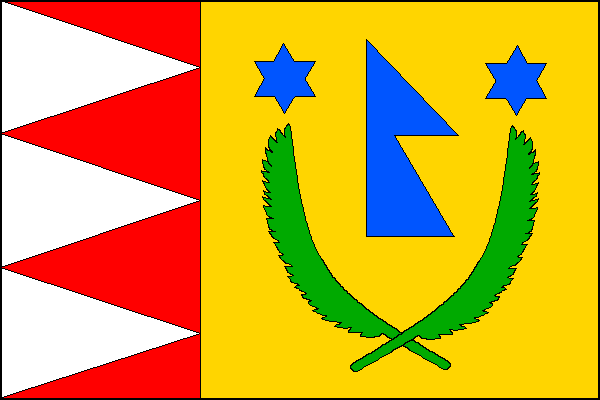
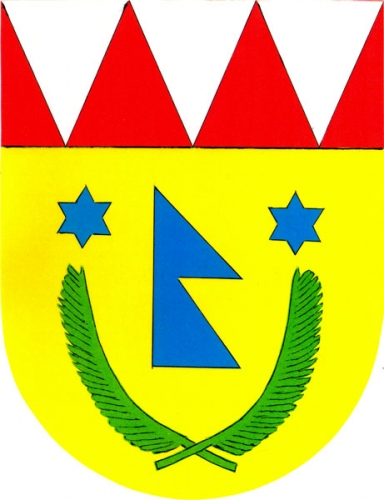
- Flag Coat of arms

- Location in the Czech Republic
- Coordinates: 49°21′47″N 17°3′49″E
- Country: Czech Republic
- Region: Olomouc
- District: Prostějov
- First mentioned: 1348

Area
  - Total: 3.21 km^{2} (1.24 sq mi)
- Elevation: 271 m (889 ft)

Population (2026-01-01)
  - Total: 336
  - Density: 105/km^{2} (271/sq mi)
- Time zone: UTC+1 (CET)
  - Summer (DST): UTC+2 (CEST)
- Postal code: 798 07
- Website: www.ondratice.cz

Ondratice is a municipality and village in Prostějov District in the Olomouc Region of the Czech Republic. It has about 300 inhabitants.

Ondratice lies approximately 14 kilometres (9 mi) south of Prostějov, 30 km (19 mi) south-west of Olomouc, and 207 km (129 mi) south-east of Prague.

== Demographics ==
Historical population
Year	Pop.	±%
1869	521	—
1880	643	+23.4%
1890	618	−3.9%
1900	696	+12.6%
1910	766	+10.1%
1921	739	−3.5%
1930	691	−6.5%
1950	618	−10.6%
1961	589	−4.7%
1970	479	−18.7%
1980	397	−17.1%
1991	360	−9.3%
2001	343	−4.7%
2011	322	−6.1%
2021	322	+0.0%
Source: Censuses
