= Doloplazy (Prostějov District) =

- Municipality
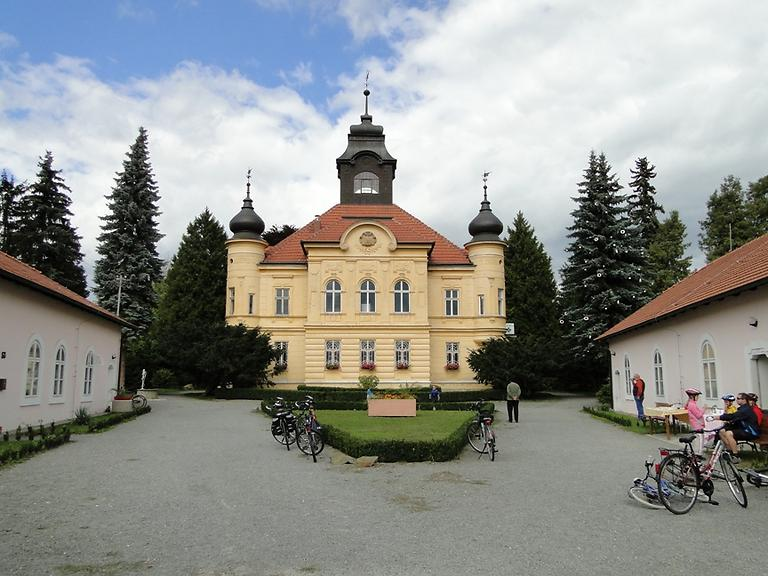
- Doloplazy Castle

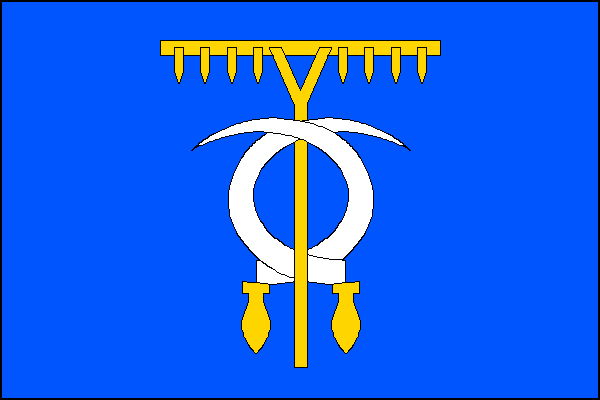
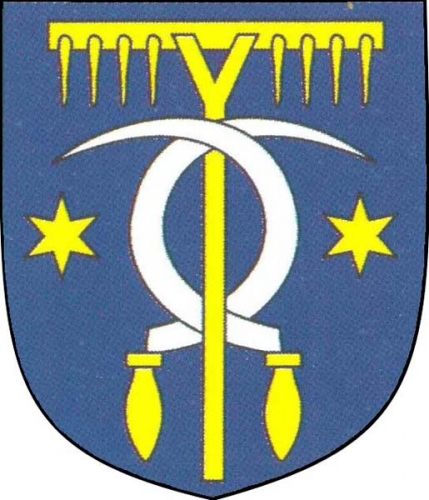
- Flag Coat of arms

- Location in the Czech Republic
- Coordinates: 49°21′0″N 17°9′36″E
- Country: Czech Republic
- Region: Olomouc
- District: Prostějov
- First mentioned: 1354

Area
  - Total: 2.92 km^{2} (1.13 sq mi)
- Elevation: 214 m (702 ft)

Population (2026-01-01)
  - Total: 516
  - Density: 177/km^{2} (458/sq mi)
- Time zone: UTC+1 (CET)
  - Summer (DST): UTC+2 (CEST)
- Postal code: 798 26
- Website: www.obecdoloplazy.cz

Doloplazy is a municipality and village in Prostějov District in the Olomouc Region of the Czech Republic. It has about 500 inhabitants.

Doloplazy lies approximately 14 kilometres (9 mi) south of Prostějov, 29 km (18 mi) south of Olomouc, and 213 km (132 mi) south-east of Prague.

== Administrative division ==
Doloplazy consists of two municipal parts (in brackets population according to the 2021 census):

- Doloplazy (386)
- Poličky (114)

== Demographics ==
Historical population
Year	Pop.	±%
1869	518	—
1880	571	+10.2%
1890	578	+1.2%
1900	583	+0.9%
1910	610	+4.6%
1921	588	−3.6%
1930	684	+16.3%
1950	618	−9.6%
1961	624	+1.0%
1970	563	−9.8%
1980	489	−13.1%
1991	557	+13.9%
2001	572	+2.7%
2011	530	−7.3%
2021	500	−5.7%
Source: Censuses
