= List of windmills in the Czech Republic =

This is a list of windmills in the Czech Republic.

| Location (municipality) | Region | Type | Built | Notes and references | Image | Coordinates |
|---|---|---|---|---|---|---|
| Arnoltice | Ústí nad Labem | Tower | 1830 | Worked until 1877; house conversion in 1968 | | 50°50′22″N 14°15′42″E |
| Bařice-Velké Těšany | Zlín | Post | 1830 | Today a museum; protected as a national cultural monument | | 49°14′25″N 17°24′42″E |
| Bílov | Moravian-Silesian | Post | 2023 | Replica | | 49°44′9″N 18°0′6″E |
| Bílovec-Stará Ves | Moravian-Silesian | Post | 1878 | Moved to its current location in 1910 | | 49°45′58″N 17°56′15″E |
| Borovnice | Hradec Králové | Post | | | | 50°30′27″N 15°36′9″E |
| Brušperk | Moravian-Silesian | Tower | | | | 49°42′6″N 18°13′47″E |
| Budišov | Vysočina | Tower | 1838 | Ruin | | 49°16′47″N 16°0′37″E |
| Bukovany | South Moravian | Tower | 2004 | Replica | | 49°2′25″N 17°5′29″E |
| Bzová | Central Bohemian | Tower | | House conversion | | 49°53′43″N 13°51′55″E |
| Chomutov | Ústí nad Labem | Tower | | Replica; part of an open air museum | | 50°28′40″N 13°25′50″E |
| Chvalkovice | South Moravian | Tower | 1873 | Complete internally; worked by engine until 1941 | | 49°11′9″N 17°7′6″E |
| Dětkovice | Olomouc | Tower | 1809 | House conversion | | 49°24′41″N 17°4′38″E |
| Dobříš | Central Bohemian | Tower | | Replica, unfinished as of 2026 | | 49°46′38″N 14°9′2″E |
| Hačky | Olomouc | Smock | | | | 49°37′17″N 16°55′55″E |
| Heřmanice | Liberec | Tower | 1830 | Converted into a lookout tower in 1897; today a ruin | | 50°51′56″N 15°0′13″E |
| Hlavnice | Moravian-Silesian | Post | 1810 | | | 49°55′45″N 17°42′25″E |
| Hodslavice | Moravian-Silesian | Tower | 1864 | House conversion; worked until 1931 | | 49°32′56″N 18°1′21″E |
| Horní Podluží-Světlík | Ústí nad Labem | Tower | 1843 | | | 50°53′44″N 14°33′26″E |
| Hukvaldy-Dolní Sklenov | Moravian-Silesian | Tower | 1804 | | | 49°37′45″N 18°12′44″E |
| Huntířov-Františkův Vrch | Ústí nad Labem | Tower | 1876 | House conversion in 2000–2001 | | 50°46′55″N 14°18′32″E |
| Hustopeče nad Bečvou-Poruba | Olomouc | Tower | 1854 | Recostructed in 2017 | | 49°32′0″N 17°53′40″E |
| Jalubí | Zlín | Tower | 2009 | Replica of a mill destroyed in 1945 | | 49°7′28″N 17°25′52″E |
| Janov | Ústí nad Labem | Tower | 1844 | House conversion; worked until the 1920s | | 50°51′28″N 14°15′46″E |
| Klobouky u Brna | South Moravian | Post | 1825 | Originally built in Pacetluky; moved to Klobouky u Brna in 1982 | | 48°59′30″N 16°51′29″E |
| Kořenec | South Moravian | Tower | 1866 | Worked until 1950; has preserved milling technical equipment | | 49°31′42″N 16°45′17″E |
| Kořenov-Polubný | Liberec | Tower | | House conversion | | 50°46′24″N 15°21′1″E |
| Krchleby | Central Bohemian | Tower | | | | 50°14′29″N 15°0′56″E |
| Kunkovice | Zlín | Tower | 1889 | | | 49°11′2″N 17°10′18″E |
| Kuželov | South Moravian | Tower | 1842 | Restored in 1973; protected as a national cultural monument | | 48°51′10″N 17°29′45″E |
| Lesná | South Moravian | Tower | 1850 | Converted into a wheelwright's workshop in 1908; today a restaurant | | 48°54′23″N 15°52′29″E |
| Libhošť | Moravian-Silesian | Tower | 1842 | Built in 1842 at the latest; house conversion in 1900 | | 49°37′54″N 18°4′15″E |
| Litultovice | Moravian-Silesian | Post | 1833 | Originally stood in Sádek, moved to Litultovice in 1878 | | 49°54′42″N 17°45′2″E |
| Malé Hradisko | Olomouc | Tower | | House conversion | | 49°29′36″N 16°52′23″E |
| Město Libavá | Olomouc | Tower | | | | 49°43′16″N 17°31′4″E |
| Mladá Vožice-Radvanov | South Bohemian | Tower | | Ruin; worked until 1848 | | 49°30′44″N 14°49′47″E |
| Němčice | South Moravian | Tower | | House conversion, gutted of machinery. | | 49°26′38″N 16°42′59″E |
| Ostrov u Macochy | South Moravian | Tower | | | | 49°22′45″N 16°45′19″E |
| Partutovice | Olomouc | Post | 1837 | A uniquely preserved building, including internal equipment | | 49°37′39″N 17°42′31″E |
| Petrovice | South Moravian | Tower | 1849 | House conversion after a fire in 1964 | | 49°24′28″N 16°42′12″E |
| Prague-Břevnov | Prague | Tower | 1722 | Converted to a restaurant in 1899 | | 50°5′17″N 14°21′4″E |
| Přemyslovice | Olomouc | Tower | 1884 | | | 49°33′14″N 16°57′43″E |
| Příčovy | Central Bohemian | Tower | | Ruined shell. | | 49°40′32″N 14°22′56″E |
| Rožnov pod Radhoštěm | Zlín | Post | | Replica of a mill in Kladníky; part of the Wallachian Open Air Museum | | 49°27′36″N 18°9′21″E |
| Rozstání | Olomouc | Tower | | | | 49°23′59″N 16°50′58″E |
| Rudice | South Moravian | Tower | 1865 | Worked by wind until 1922 then by electric motor until 1945. Restored in 1977 and 1996. | | 49°20′1″N 16°43′40″E |
| Ruprechtov (Windmill Ruprechtov) | South Moravian | Tower, with Halladay Turbine | 1873 | Built as a conventional tower mill. Remodelled with a Halladay Turbine in 1882–1884 following gale damage. Worked until World War II. Restored in 1994–1995. | | 49°19′58″N 16°50′53″E |
| Růžová | Ústí nad Labem | Tower | 1878 | Converted into an accommodation facility; the windmill blades are a replica. | | 50°50′11″N 14°17′25″E |
| Rymice | Zlín | Post | | | | 49°20′38″N 17°31′58″E |
| Siřejovice | Ústí nad Labem | Tower | 1843 | Ruin; worked until 1870, then converted into a summer residence | | 50°28′43″N 14°4′56″E |
| Skalička | Olomouc | Post | | | | 49°30′48″N 17°47′58″E |
| Starý Poddvorov | South Moravian | Post | 1870 | | | 48°52′51″N 16°57′54″E |
| Studénka | Moravian-Silesian | Tower | | | | 49°43′50″N 18°4′20″E |
| Suchdol-Jednov | Olomouc | Tower | | | | 49°32′52″N 16°52′48″E |
| Toužetín-Donín | Ústí nad Labem | Tower | | | | 50°18′42″N 13°53′48″E |
| Třebechovice pod Orebem-Krňovice | Hradec Králové | Post | 2020 | Replica; part of an open air museum | | 50°11′21″N 15°58′49″E |
| Třebíč-Stařečka | Vysočina | Tower | 1836 | House conversion in 1932; today a museum | | 49°12′42″N 15°52′2″E |
| Uhelná | Olomouc | Tower | | | | 50°51′47″N 14°54′25″E |
| Varnsdorf | Ústí nad Labem | Tower | 1870 | House conversion after 1975, when it was a ruin | | 50°54′43″N 14°38′17″E |
| Včelákov-Příkrakov | Pardubice | Tower | 1843 | Ruin, almost disappeared | | 49°49′15″N 15°54′24″E |
| Vrátno | Central Bohemian | Tower | 1870 | House conversion; the windmill blades are a replica. | | 50°26′38″N 14°42′5″E |
| Vrbice | South Moravian | Post | 2018 | Replica of a mill destroyed in 1843 | | 48°55′5″N 16°53′57″E |
| Žáky-Štrampouch | Central Bohemian | Tower | 1820 | Ruin; worked until 1873 | | 49°51′58″N 15°21′37″E |
| Zbyslavice | Moravian-Silesian | Tower | 1869 | House conversion | | 49°47′50″N 18°5′9″E |
| Zlín-Štípa | Zlín | Tower | 1858 | | | 49°15′47″N 17°44′23″E |
