= Dětkovice =

Dětkovice may refer to places in the Czech Republic:

- Dětkovice (Prostějov District), a municipality and village in the Olomouc Region
- Dětkovice (Vyškov District), a municipality and village in the South Moravian Region
- Dětkovice, a village and part of Ludmírov in the Olomouc Region
