= Hacky =

Hacky can refer to:

- Hačky, a Czech village
- Hacky sack, or footbag

== See also ==
- Hack (disambiguation)
