= Klobouky u Brna =

- Town
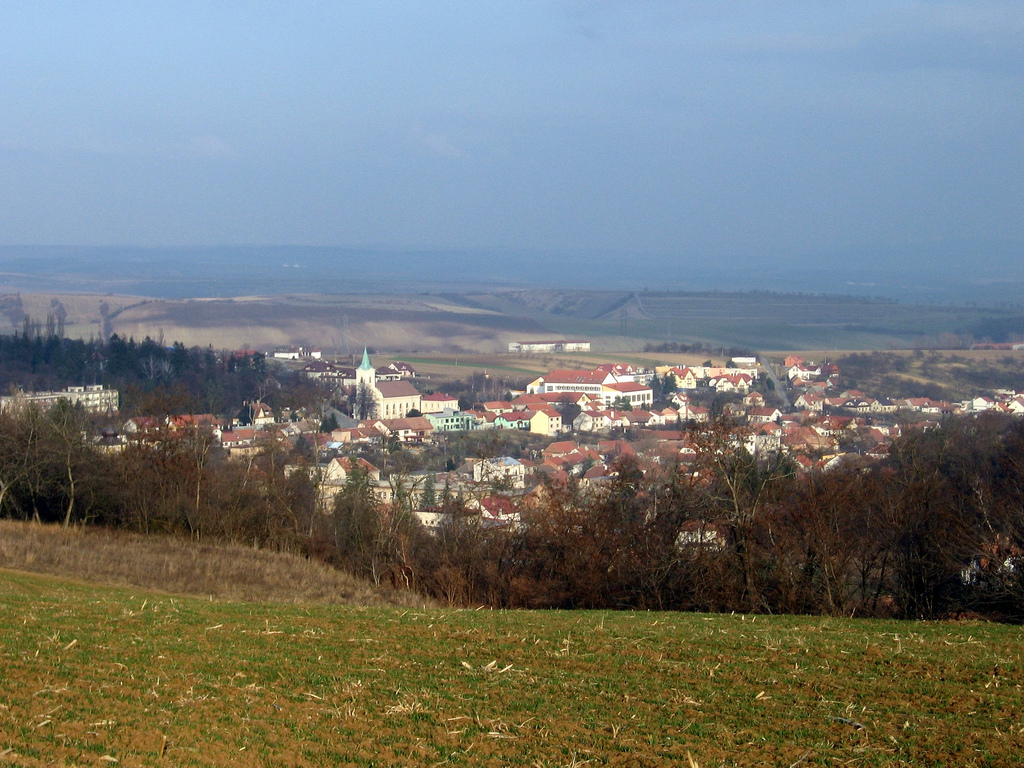
- General view of the town

- Flag Coat of arms

- Location in the Czech Republic
- Coordinates: 48°59′42″N 16°51′34″E
- Country: Czech Republic
- Region: South Moravian
- District: Břeclav
- First mentioned: 1210

Government
  - Mayor: Pavel Volek

Area
  - Total: 31.27 km^{2} (12.07 sq mi)
- Elevation: 228 m (748 ft)

Population (2026-01-01)
  - Total: 2,471
  - Density: 79.02/km^{2} (204.7/sq mi)
- Time zone: UTC+1 (CET)
  - Summer (DST): UTC+2 (CEST)
- Postal code: 691 72
- Website: www.kloboukyubrna.eu

Klobouky u Brna (Czech pronunciation: [ˈkloboukɪ ˈu br̩na]; until 1992 Klobouky) is a town in Břeclav District in the South Moravian Region of the Czech Republic. It has about 2,500 inhabitants.

== Administrative division ==
Klobouky u Brna consists of five municipal parts (in brackets population according to the 2021 census):

- Klobouky u Brna (2,201)
- Bohumilice (219)

== Etymology ==
The Czech word klobouky means 'hats'. The name was probably derived from the shape of the surrounding hills. On 7 October 1992, the town was renamed from Klobouky to Klobouky u Brna ('Klobouky near Brno').

== Geography ==
Klobouky u Brna is located about 25 kilometres (16 mi) north of Břeclav and 28 km (17 mi) southeast of Brno. Almost the entire municipal territory lies in the Ždánice Forest range, only a small part in the east extends into the Kyjov Hills. The highest point is the hill Nedánov at 368 m (1,207 ft) above sea level.

== History ==
The first written mention of both Klobouky and Bohumilice is from 1210, when Lev of Klobouky donated the villages to the Premonstratensian monastery in Zábrdovice (today part of Brno), which he founded. In 1298, Klobouky was promoted to a market town by King Wenceslaus II. The monastery owned the Klobouky estate until its abolishment in 1784.

Klobouky was located on an important route between Moravia and Kingdom of Hungary, from which it profited in times of peace, but suffered from the passage of troops and looting in times of war. The settlement was badly damaged during the Bocskai uprising and during the Thirty Years' War.

Klobouky obtained the town status in 1964.

== Demographics ==
Historical population

Year	Pop.	±%
1869	2,687	—
1880	2,829	+5.3%
1890	2,703	−4.5%
1900	2,774	+2.6%
1910	2,723	−1.8%

Year	Pop.	±%
1921	2,720	−0.1%
1930	2,675	−1.7%
1950	2,480	−7.3%
1961	2,591	+4.5%
1970	2,433	−6.1%

Year	Pop.	±%
1980	2,341	−3.8%
1991	2,299	−1.8%
2001	2,228	−3.1%
2011	2,325	+4.4%
2021	2,420	+4.1%

Source: Censuses

== Transport ==
There are no major roads passing through the town. The railway that starts in the eastern part of the municipal territory is unused.

== Sights ==
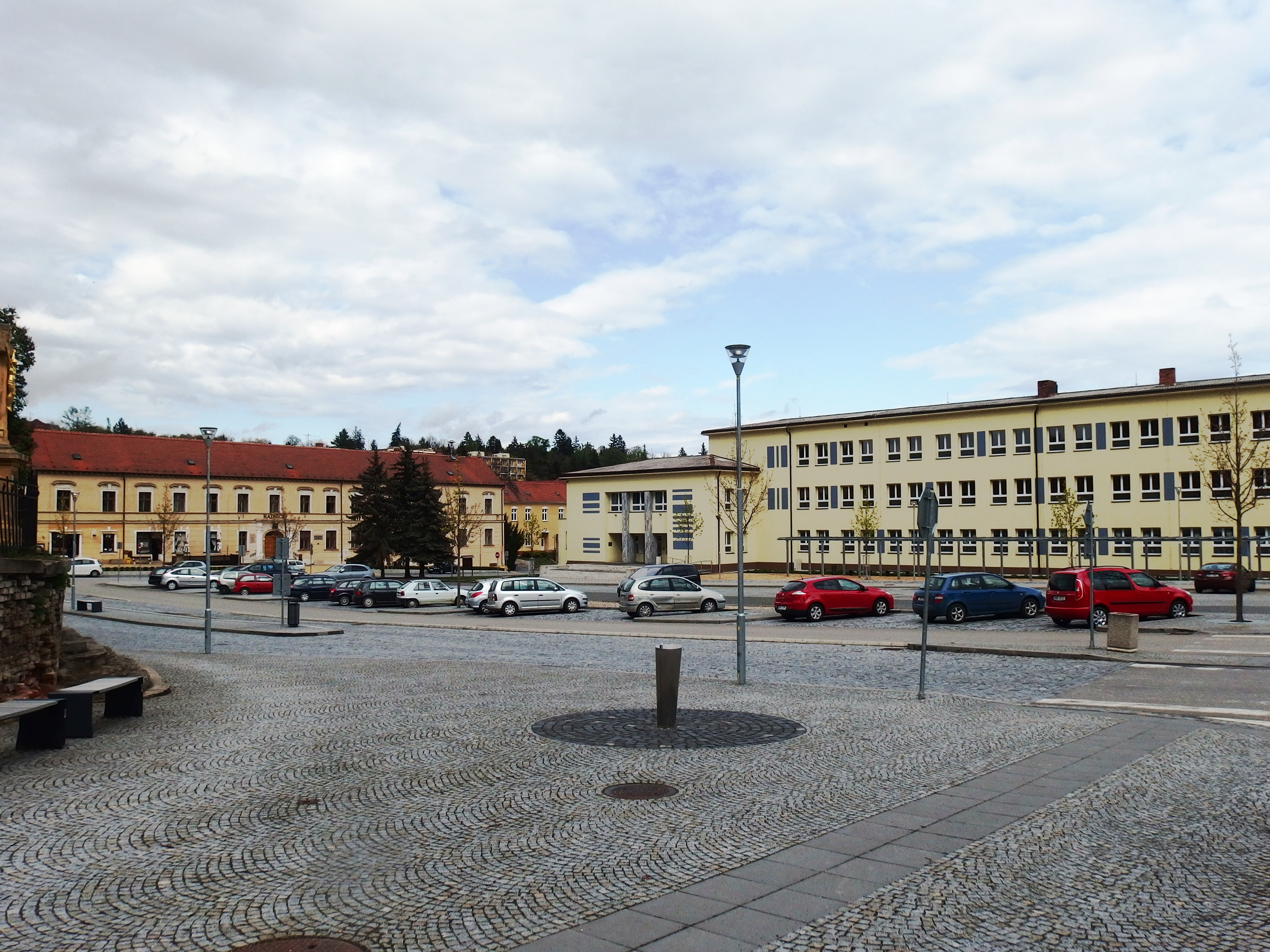
Town square with the castle (left)

Among the main landmarks of the town centre are a castle and two churches. The Church of Saint Lawrence was built in the Baroque style in 1655. The Evangelical church was built in the Historicist style and dates from the second half of the 19th century.

The Klobouky u Brna Castle is the most important urban component of the town. It originally served as a residence of the Zábrdovice monastery. Today it houses the town museum.

The main symbol of Klobouky u Brna is a two-storey wooden windmill, located on a hill near the town. It was moved there from Pacetluky in 1825. After it was destroyed by a fire during World War II, the mill was reconstructed in 1985.

The Chapel of Saint Barbara was built in 1669. It is a distinctive feature located on a hill above the town.
