= Kunkovice =

- Municipality
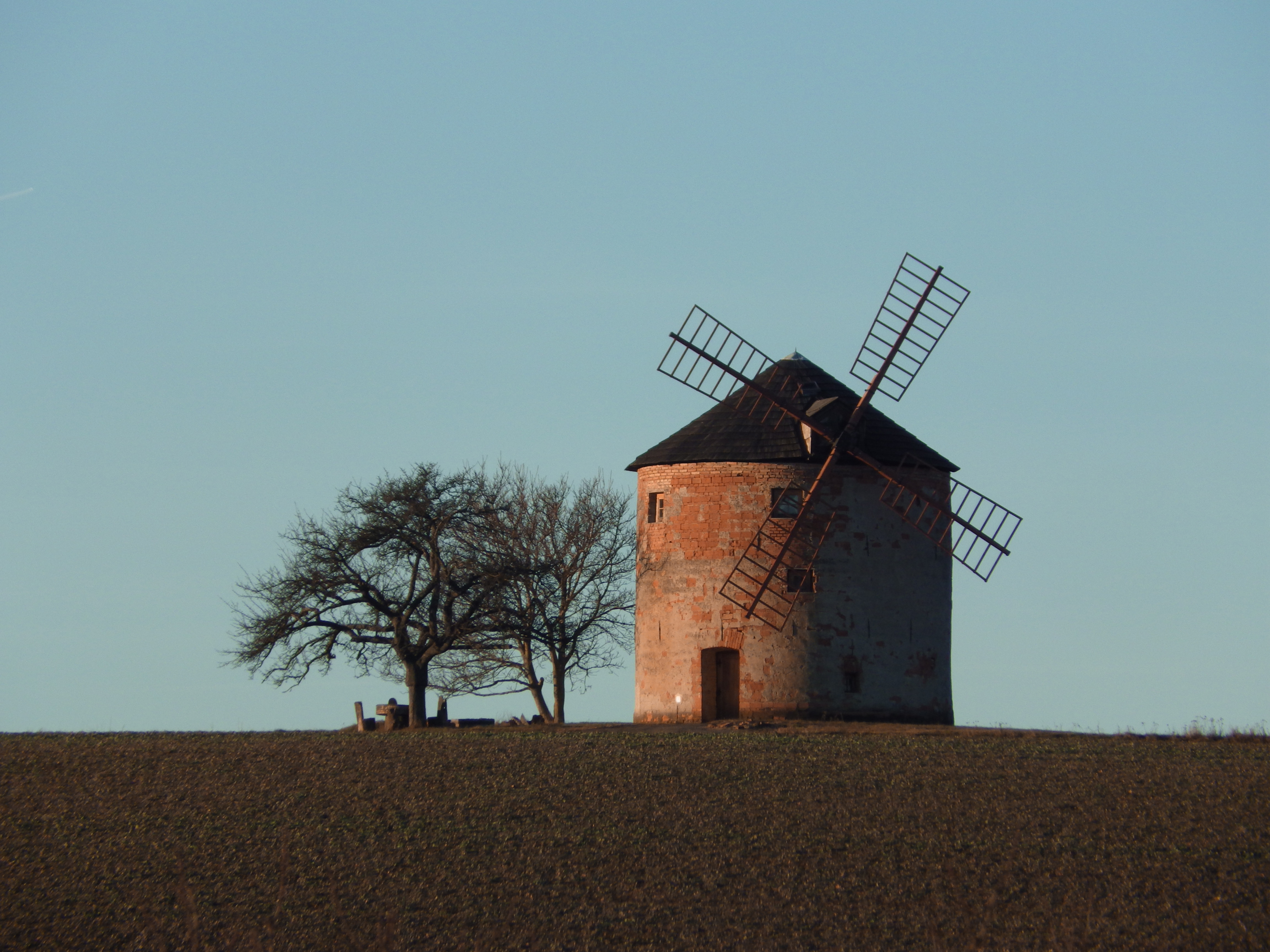
- Windmill

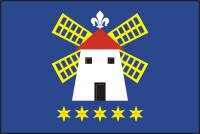
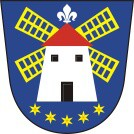
- Flag Coat of arms

- Location in the Czech Republic
- Coordinates: 49°10′58″N 17°10′27″E
- Country: Czech Republic
- Region: Zlín
- District: Kroměříž
- First mentioned: 1141

Area
  - Total: 7.12 km^{2} (2.75 sq mi)
- Elevation: 309 m (1,014 ft)

Population (2026-01-01)
  - Total: 71
  - Density: 10/km^{2} (26/sq mi)
- Time zone: UTC+1 (CET)
  - Summer (DST): UTC+2 (CEST)
- Postal code: 768 13
- Website: www.kunkovice.cz

Kunkovice is a municipality and village in Kroměříž District in the Zlín Region of the Czech Republic. It has about 70 inhabitants.

Kunkovice lies approximately 21 kilometres (13 mi) south-west of Kroměříž, 36 km (22 mi) west of Zlín, and 223 km (139 mi) south-east of Prague.

== Demographics ==
Historical population
Year	Pop.	±%
1869	370	—
1880	400	+8.1%
1890	399	−0.2%
1900	378	−5.3%
1910	373	−1.3%
1921	360	−3.5%
1930	343	−4.7%
1950	257	−25.1%
1961	233	−9.3%
1970	199	−14.6%
1980	151	−24.1%
1991	104	−31.1%
2001	74	−28.8%
2011	52	−29.7%
2021	80	+53.8%
Source: Censuses
