= Siřejovice =

- Municipality
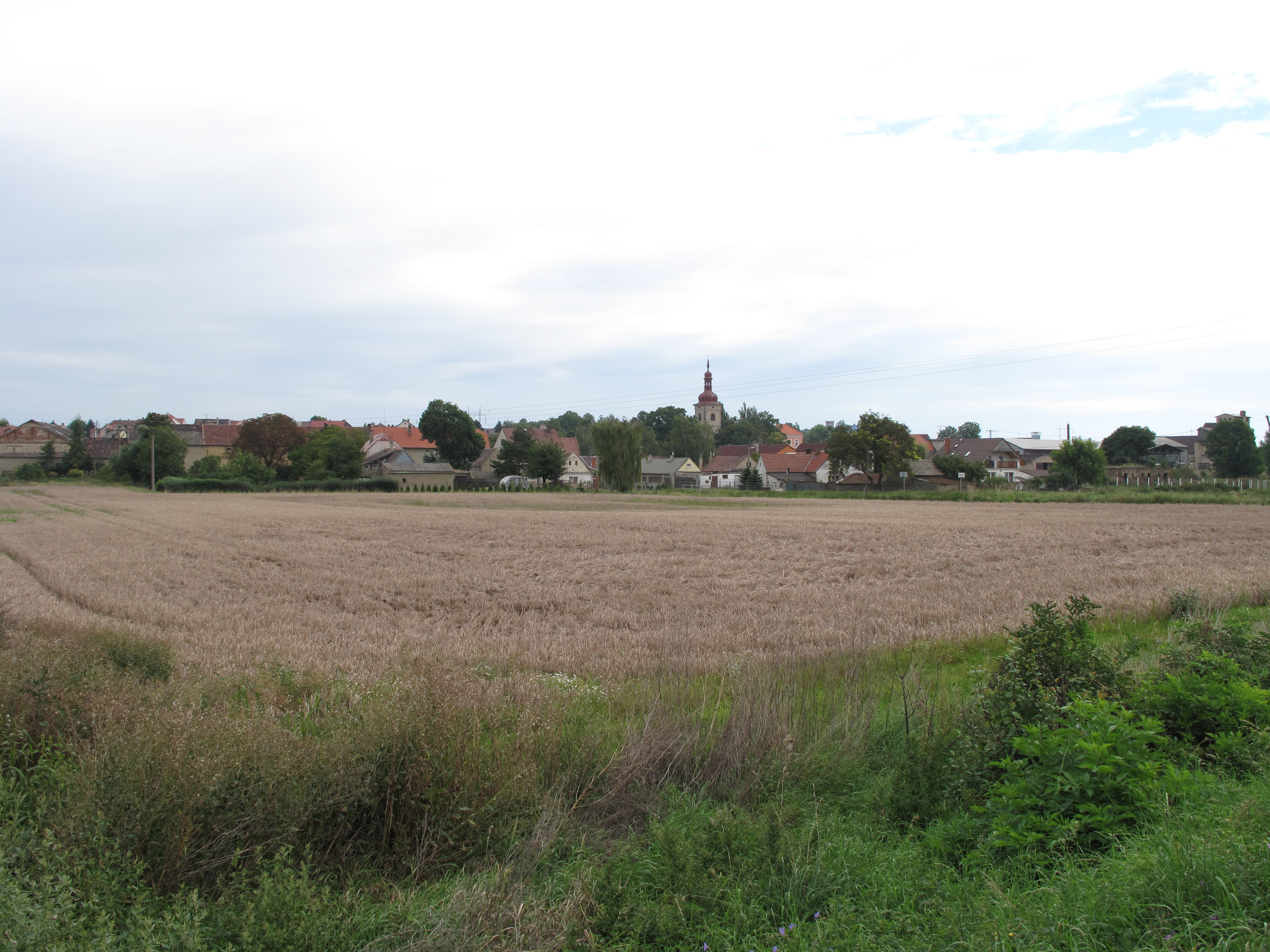
- View from the west

- Flag Coat of arms

- Location in the Czech Republic
- Coordinates: 50°28′42″N 14°4′16″E
- Country: Czech Republic
- Region: Ústí nad Labem
- District: Litoměřice
- First mentioned: 1227

Area
  - Total: 6.16 km^{2} (2.38 sq mi)
- Elevation: 185 m (607 ft)

Population (2026-01-01)
  - Total: 270
  - Density: 44/km^{2} (110/sq mi)
- Time zone: UTC+1 (CET)
  - Summer (DST): UTC+2 (CEST)
- Postal code: 410 02
- Website: www.sirejovice.cz

Siřejovice is a municipality and village in Litoměřice District in the Ústí nad Labem Region of the Czech Republic. It has about 300 inhabitants.

Siřejovice lies approximately 7 kilometres (4 mi) south-west of Litoměřice, 21 km (13 mi) south of Ústí nad Labem, and 50 km (31 mi) north-west of Prague.

== Demographics ==
Historical population
Year	Pop.	±%
1869	363	—
1880	376	+3.6%
1890	345	−8.2%
1900	373	+8.1%
1910	422	+13.1%
1921	413	−2.1%
1930	515	+24.7%
1950	356	−30.9%
1961	332	−6.7%
1970	318	−4.2%
1980	280	−11.9%
1991	252	−10.0%
2001	276	+9.5%
2011	267	−3.3%
2021	260	−2.6%
Source: Censuses
