= Kořenec =

- Municipality
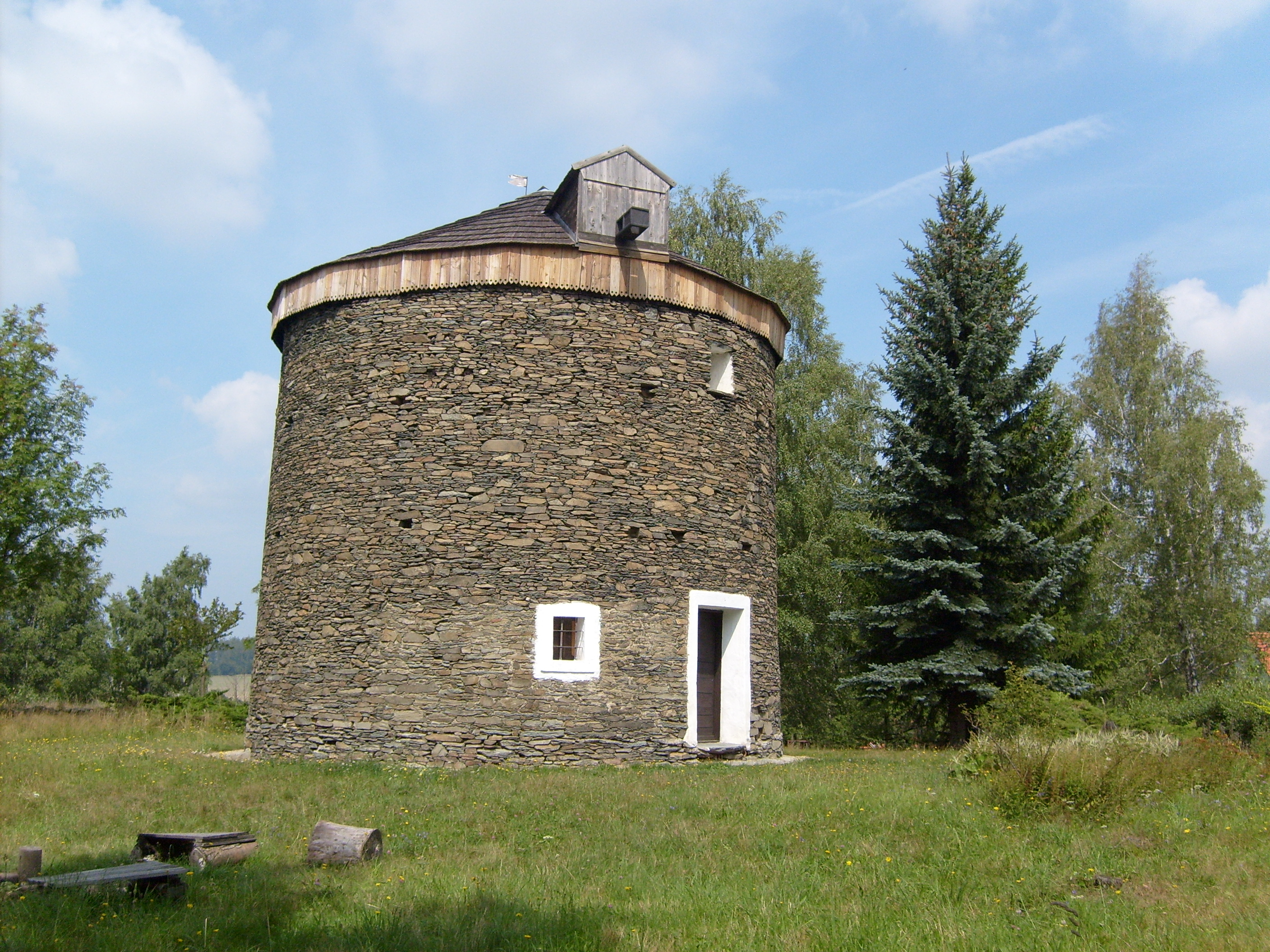
- Windmill

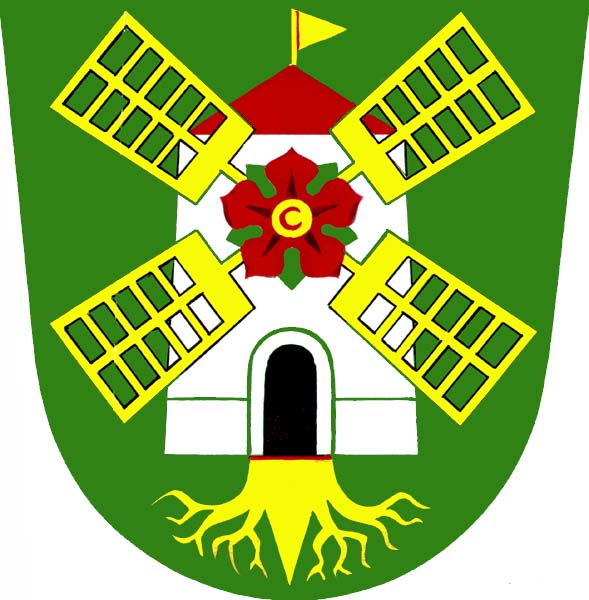
- Flag Coat of arms

- Location in the Czech Republic
- Coordinates: 49°31′49″N 16°45′14″E
- Country: Czech Republic
- Region: South Moravian
- District: Blansko
- First mentioned: 1490

Area
  - Total: 8.11 km^{2} (3.13 sq mi)
- Elevation: 620 m (2,030 ft)

Population (2026-01-01)
  - Total: 381
  - Density: 47.0/km^{2} (122/sq mi)
- Time zone: UTC+1 (CET)
  - Summer (DST): UTC+2 (CEST)
- Postal code: 680 01
- Website: www.korenec.cz

Kořenec is a municipality and village in Blansko District in the South Moravian Region of the Czech Republic. It has about 400 inhabitants.

Kořenec lies approximately 20 kilometres (12 mi) north of Blansko, 38 km (24 mi) north of Brno, and 179 km (111 mi) east of Prague.

== Demographics ==
Historical population
Year	Pop.	±%
1869	859	—
1880	814	−5.2%
1890	838	+2.9%
1900	803	−4.2%
1910	774	−3.6%
1921	770	−0.5%
1930	718	−6.8%
1950	619	−13.8%
1961	584	−5.7%
1970	512	−12.3%
1980	409	−20.1%
1991	305	−25.4%
2001	316	+3.6%
2011	337	+6.6%
2021	338	+0.3%
Source: Censuses
