= Kladníky =

- Municipality
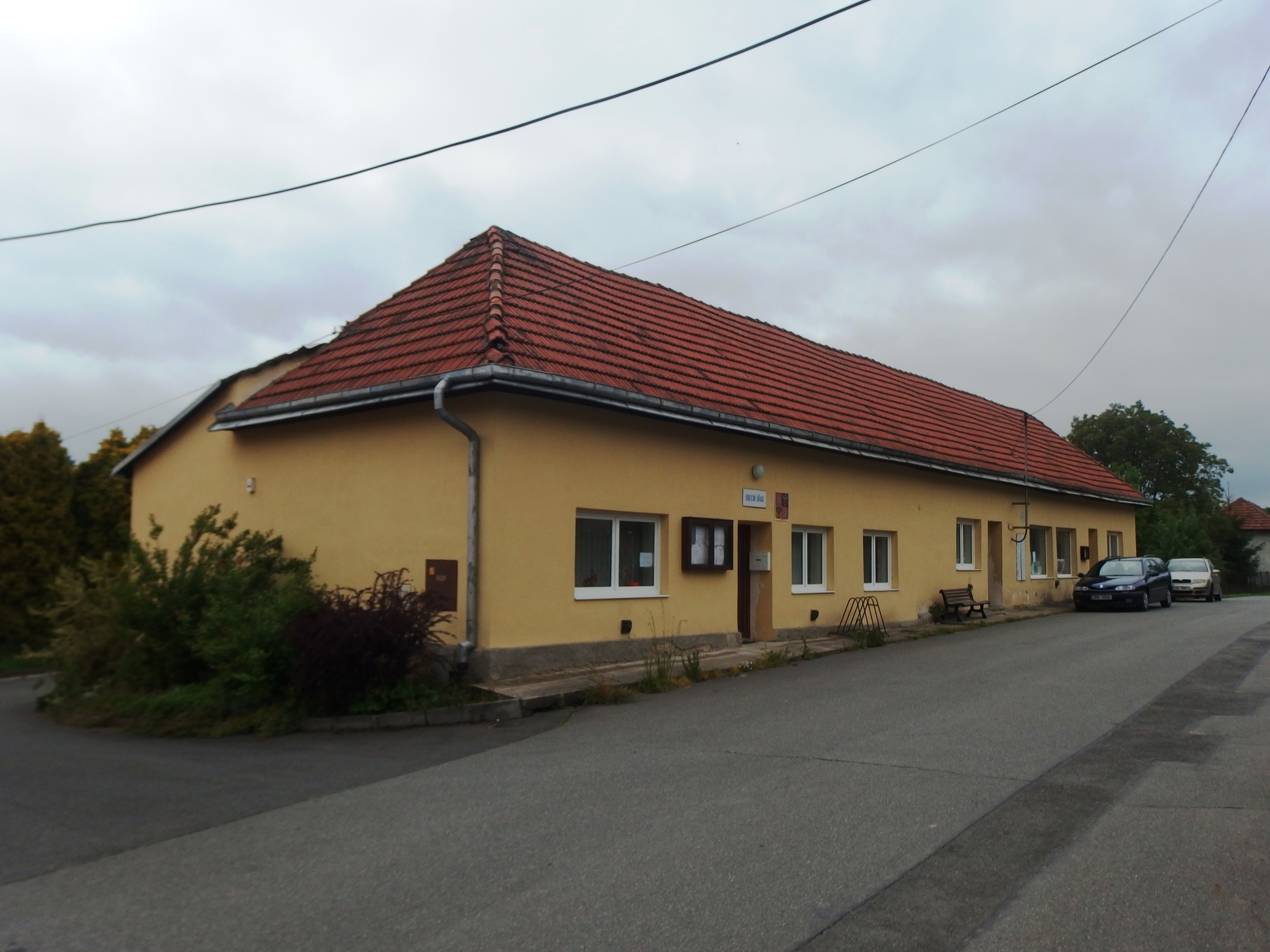
- Municipal office

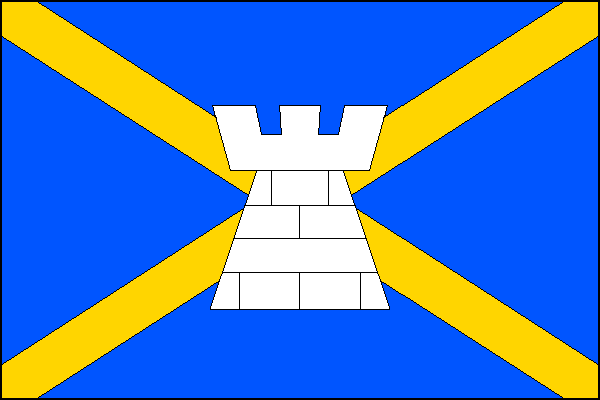
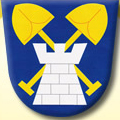
- Flag Coat of arms

- Location in the Czech Republic
- Coordinates: 49°29′1″N 17°36′11″E
- Country: Czech Republic
- Region: Olomouc
- District: Přerov
- First mentioned: 1358

Area
  - Total: 3.46 km^{2} (1.34 sq mi)
- Elevation: 318 m (1,043 ft)

Population (2026-01-01)
  - Total: 153
  - Density: 44.2/km^{2} (115/sq mi)
- Time zone: UTC+1 (CET)
  - Summer (DST): UTC+2 (CEST)
- Postal code: 751 31
- Website: www.kladniky.cz

Kladníky is a municipality and village in Přerov District in the Olomouc Region of the Czech Republic. It has about 200 inhabitants.

Kladníky lies approximately 12 kilometres (7 mi) east of Přerov, 29 km (18 mi) south-east of Olomouc, and 239 km (149 mi) east of Prague.

== Demographics ==
Historical population
Year	Pop.	±%
1869	228	—
1880	225	−1.3%
1890	210	−6.7%
1900	251	+19.5%
1910	256	+2.0%
1921	259	+1.2%
1930	254	−1.9%
1950	216	−15.0%
1961	237	+9.7%
1970	198	−16.5%
1980	172	−13.1%
1991	147	−14.5%
2001	135	−8.2%
2011	149	+10.4%
2021	135	−9.4%
Source: Censuses
