= Suchdol (Prostějov District) =

- Municipality
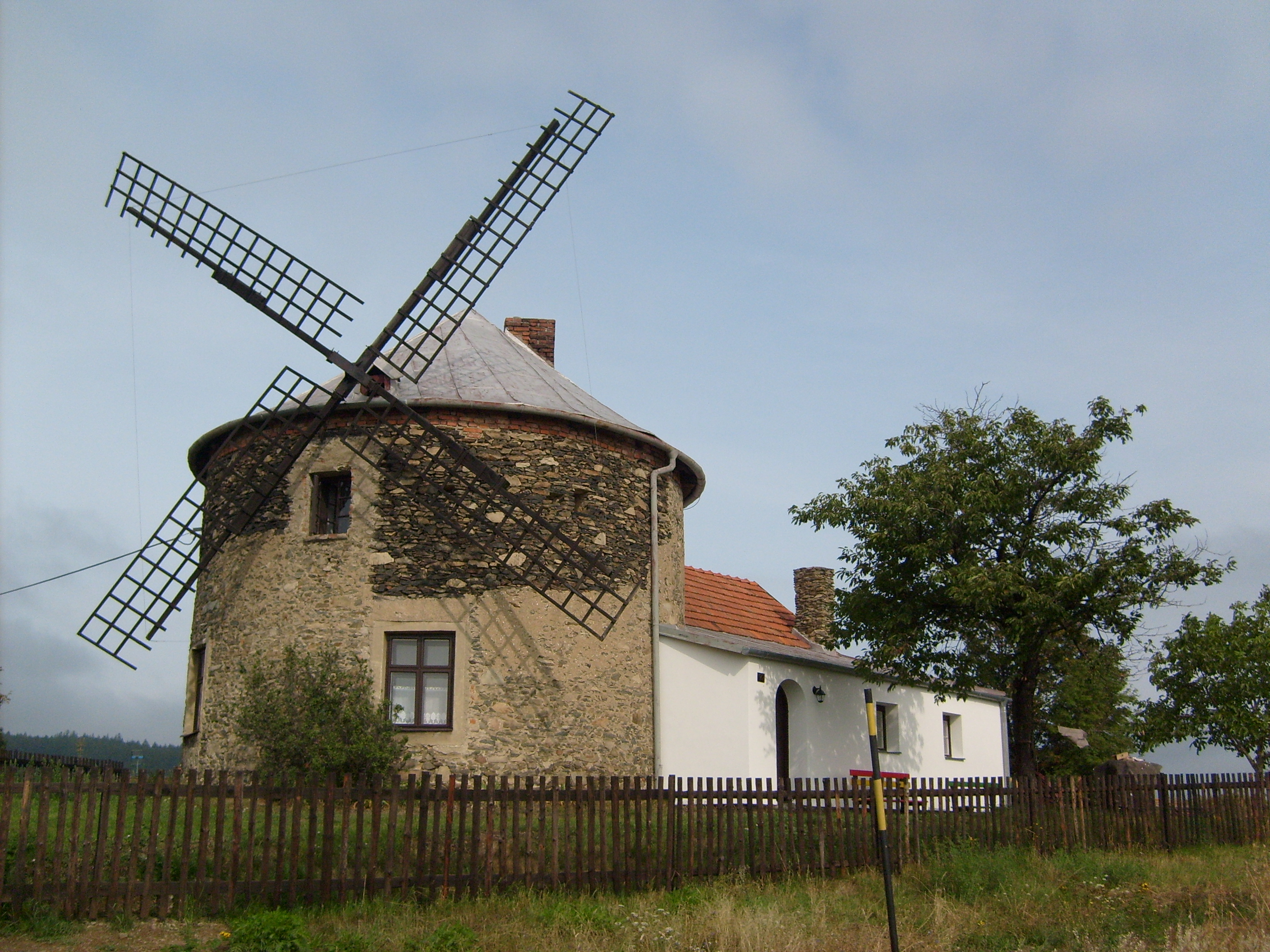
- Windmill in Jednov

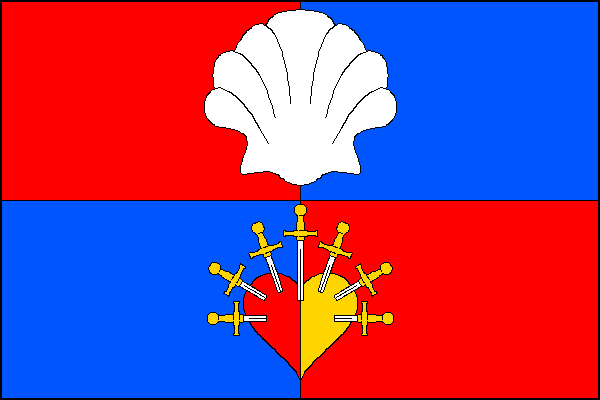
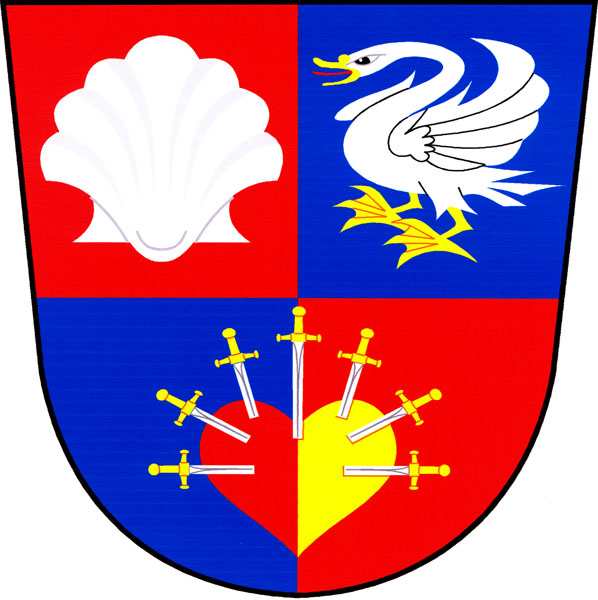
- Flag Coat of arms

- Location in the Czech Republic
- Coordinates: 49°32′50″N 16°53′48″E
- Country: Czech Republic
- Region: Olomouc
- District: Prostějov
- First mentioned: 1379

Area
  - Total: 6.69 km^{2} (2.58 sq mi)
- Elevation: 490 m (1,610 ft)

Population (2026-01-01)
  - Total: 575
  - Density: 85.9/km^{2} (223/sq mi)
- Time zone: UTC+1 (CET)
  - Summer (DST): UTC+2 (CEST)
- Postal code: 798 45
- Website: www.obec-suchdol.cz

Suchdol is a municipality and village in Prostějov District in the Olomouc Region of the Czech Republic. It has about 600 inhabitants.

Suchdol lies approximately 18 kilometres (11 mi) north-west of Prostějov, 27 km (17 mi) west of Olomouc, and 188 km (117 mi) east of Prague.

== Administrative division ==
Suchdol consists of three municipal parts (in brackets population according to the 2021 census):

- Suchdol (308)
- Jednov (176)
- Labutice (53)

== Demographics ==
Historical population
Year	Pop.	±%
1869	1,209	—
1880	1,270	+5.0%
1890	1,267	−0.2%
1900	1,282	+1.2%
1910	1,303	+1.6%
1921	1,282	−1.6%
1930	1,212	−5.5%
1950	949	−21.7%
1961	1,036	+9.2%
1970	923	−10.9%
1980	797	−13.7%
1991	701	−12.0%
2001	662	−5.6%
2011	604	−8.8%
2021	537	−11.1%
Source: Censuses
