= Bařice-Velké Těšany =

- Municipality
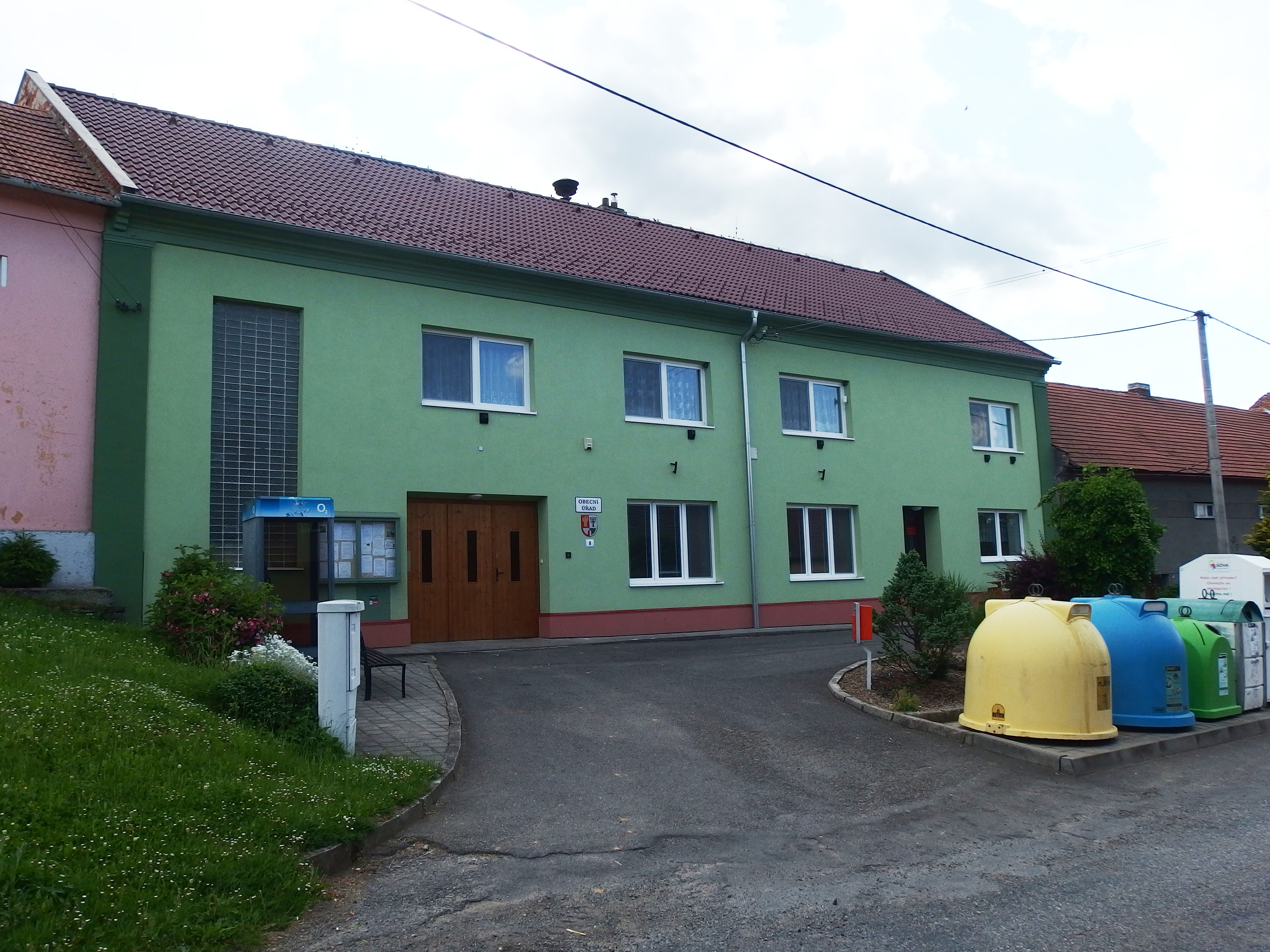
- Municipal office

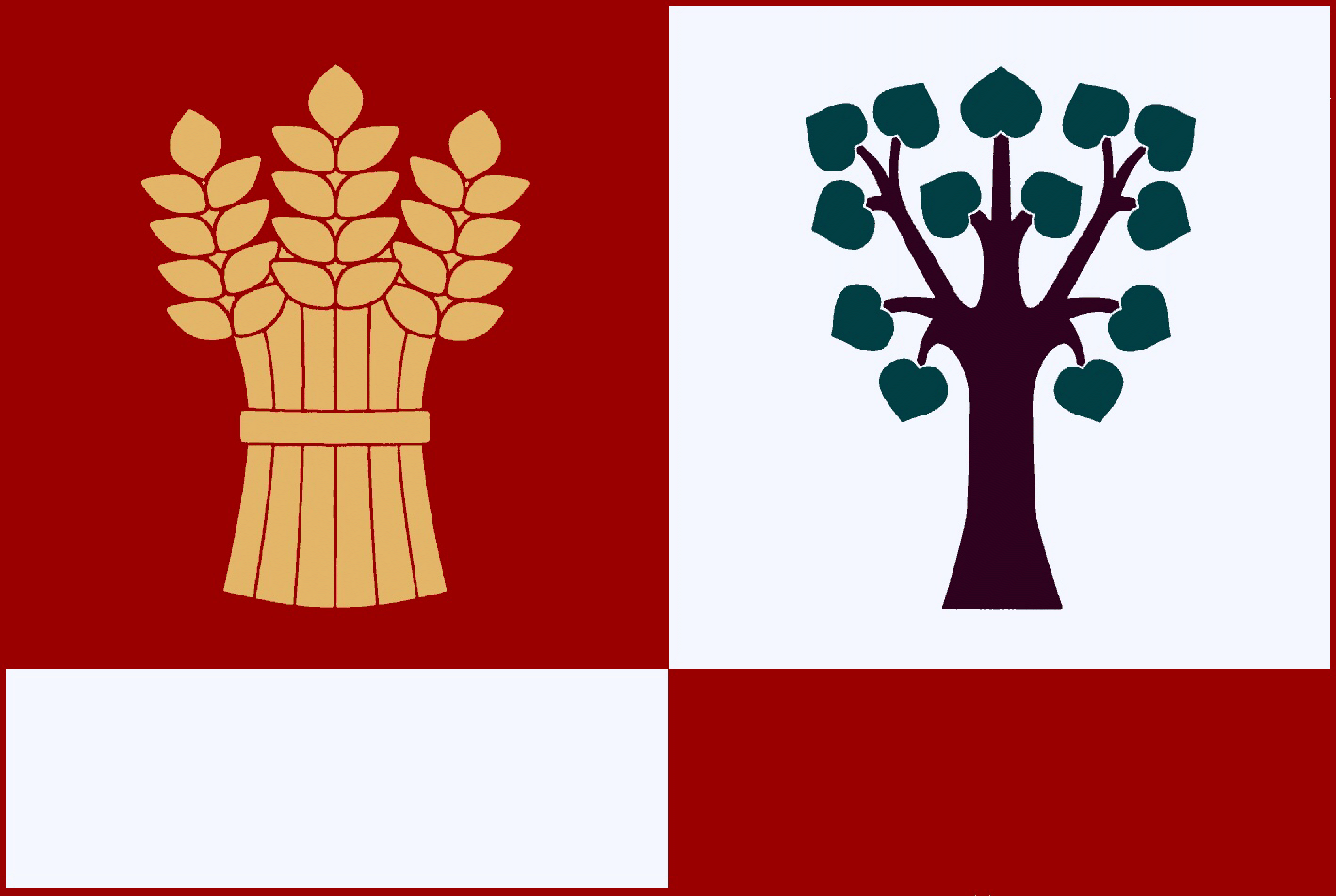
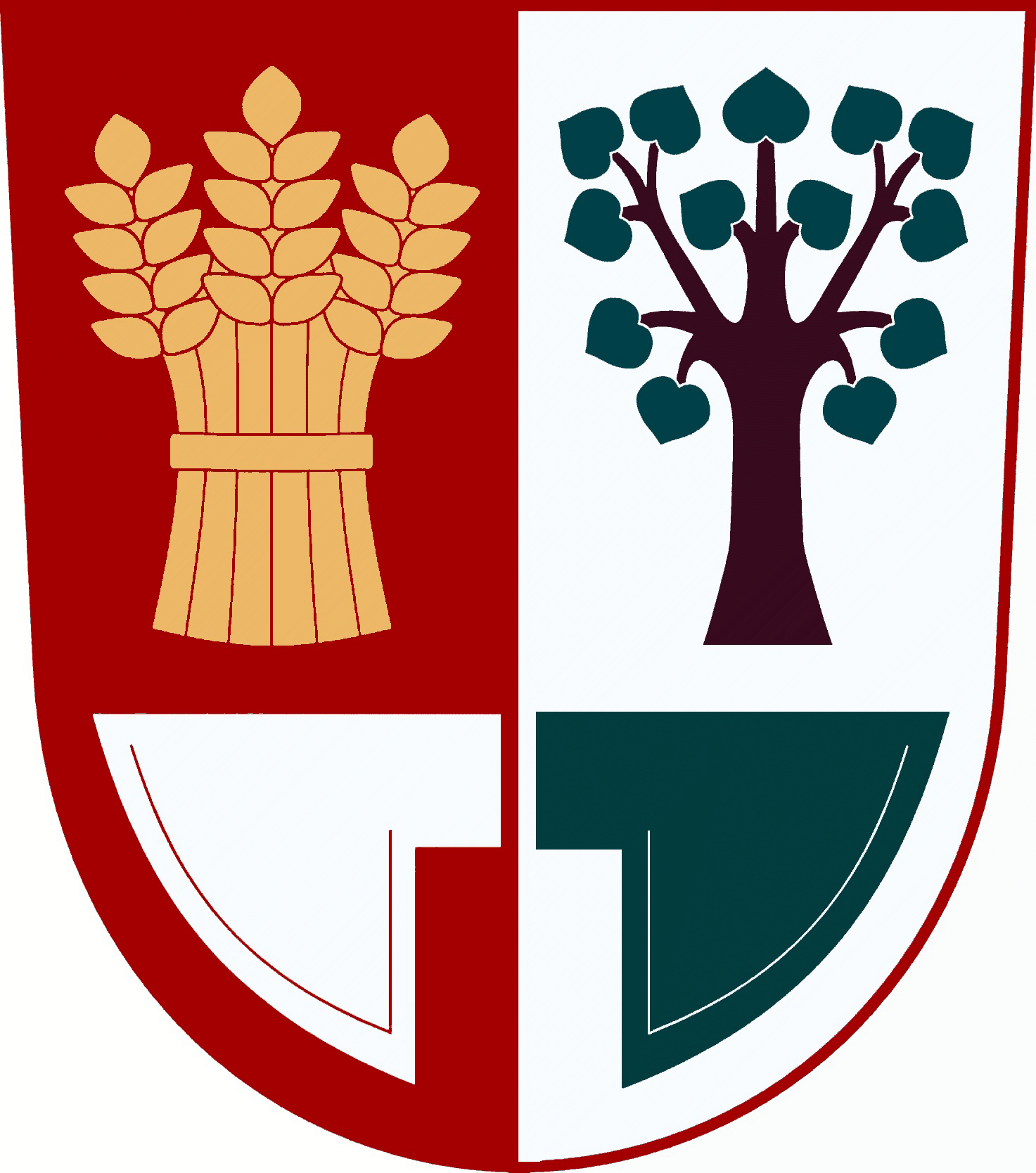
- Flag Coat of arms

- Location in the Czech Republic
- Coordinates: 49°14′43″N 17°25′34″E
- Country: Czech Republic
- Region: Zlín
- District: Kroměříž
- First mentioned: 1228

Area
  - Total: 6.69 km^{2} (2.58 sq mi)
- Elevation: 228 m (748 ft)

Population (2026-01-01)
  - Total: 439
  - Density: 65.6/km^{2} (170/sq mi)
- Time zone: UTC+1 (CET)
  - Summer (DST): UTC+2 (CEST)
- Postal code: 767 01
- Website: www.barice-velketesany.cz

Bařice-Velké Těšany is a municipality in Kroměříž District in the Zlín Region of the Czech Republic. It has about 400 inhabitants. Velké Těšany is known for one of the two best-preserved windmills in the country, which is protected as a national cultural monument.

== Administrative division ==
Bařice-Velké Těšany consists of two municipal parts (in brackets population according to the 2021 census):

- Bařice (245)
- Velké Těšany (202)

== Etymology ==
The name Bařice was probably derived from the Czech word bažina, meaning 'swamp'. The name Těšany was derived from the personal name Těch. Těšany was oficially renamed to Velké Těšany ('great Těšany') in 1921, but the name had been unofficially used for centuries before.

== Geography ==
Bařice-Velké Těšany is located about 5 kilometres (3 mi) south of Kroměříž and 16 km (10 mi) west of Zlín. It lies in the Chřiby range. The highest point is at 323 m (1,060 ft) above sea level.

== History ==
The first written mention of Bařice is from 1228, when it was a property of the monastery in Velehrad. Velké Těšany was first mentioned in 1375. In the 15th century, Bařice was owned by a local noble family who called themselves the Lords of Bařice. In 1592, both Bařice and Velké Těšany were bought by the town of Kroměříž.

The municipalities of Bařice and Velké Těšany were merged in 1960. In the 1990s, there were efforts to re-separate the municipalities, but they failed.

== Demographics ==
Historical population

Year	Pop.	±%
1869	609	—
1880	651	+6.9%
1890	696	+6.9%
1900	720	+3.4%
1910	713	−1.0%

Year	Pop.	±%
1921	694	−2.7%
1930	651	−6.2%
1950	601	−7.7%
1961	595	−1.0%
1970	527	−11.4%

Year	Pop.	±%
1980	446	−15.4%
1991	454	+1.8%
2001	473	+4.2%
2011	497	+5.1%
2021	447	−10.1%

Source: Censuses

== Transport ==
There are no railways or major roads passing through the municipality.

== Sights ==
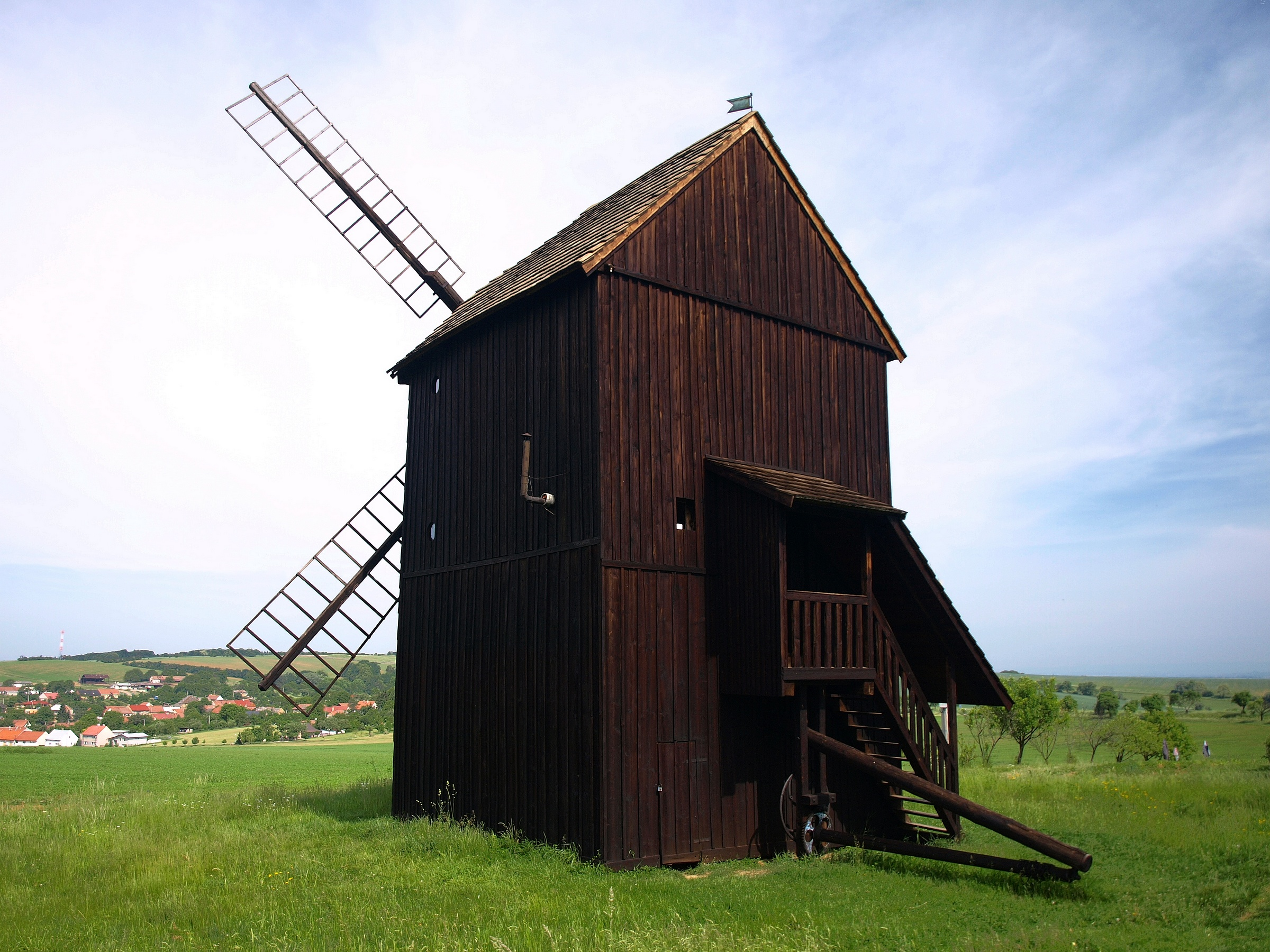
Windmill in Velké Těšany

The main landmark of the municipality is the windmill in Velké Těšany. It is a well-preserved German-style wooden windmill, built in 1830. The grinding equipment is complete and functional. For its value, the windmill is protected as a national cultural monument. It houses an exhibition, maintained by the Kroměříž District Museum.
