= Krchleby (Nymburk District) =

- Municipality
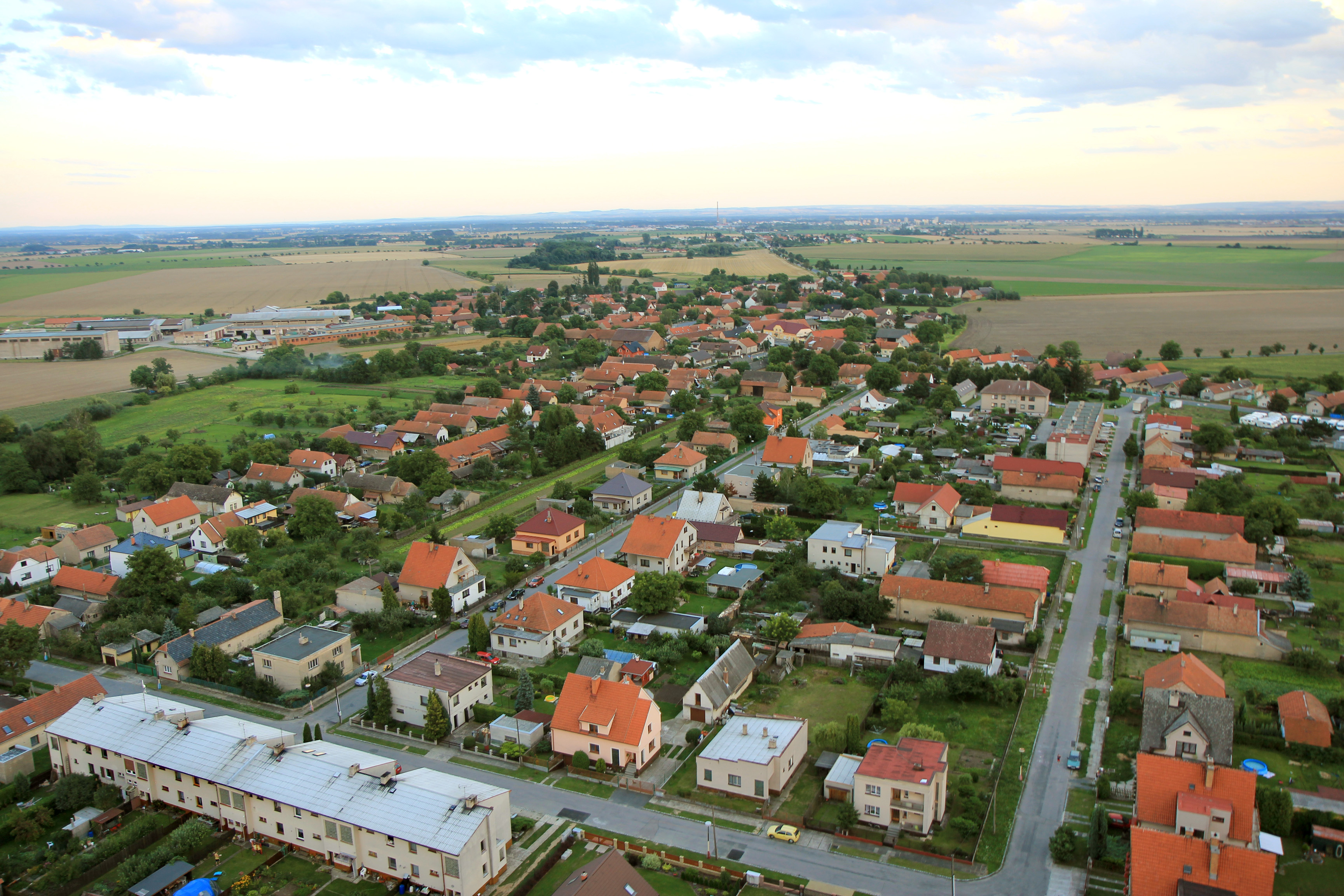
- Krchleby seen from the north

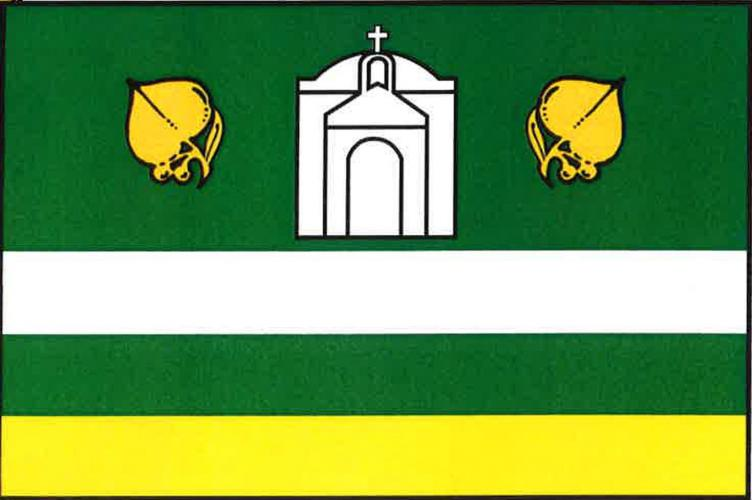
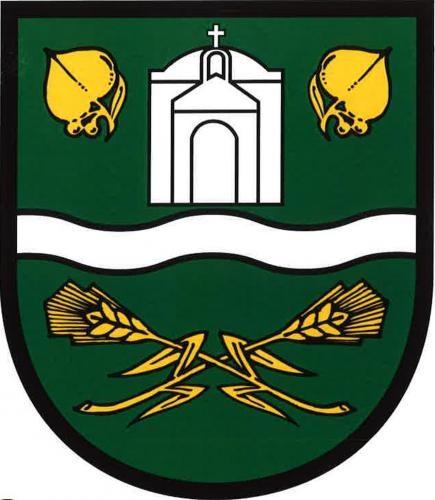
- Flag Coat of arms

- Location in the Czech Republic
- Coordinates: 50°14′21″N 15°1′22″E
- Country: Czech Republic
- Region: Central Bohemian
- District: Nymburk
- First mentioned: 1323

Area
  - Total: 8.13 km^{2} (3.14 sq mi)
- Elevation: 200 m (660 ft)

Population (2026-01-01)
  - Total: 804
  - Density: 98.9/km^{2} (256/sq mi)
- Time zone: UTC+1 (CET)
  - Summer (DST): UTC+2 (CEST)
- Postal code: 288 02
- Website: www.krchleby.eu

Krchleby is a municipality and village in Nymburk District in the Central Bohemian Region of the Czech Republic. It has about 800 inhabitants.

== Demographics ==
Historical population
Year	Pop.	±%
1869	673	—
1880	720	+7.0%
1890	821	+14.0%
1900	807	−1.7%
1910	830	+2.9%
1921	858	+3.4%
1930	817	−4.8%
1950	702	−14.1%
1961	753	+7.3%
1970	729	−3.2%
1980	753	+3.3%
1991	716	−4.9%
2001	713	−0.4%
2011	744	+4.3%
2021	729	−2.0%
Source: Censuses
