= Příčovy =

- Municipality
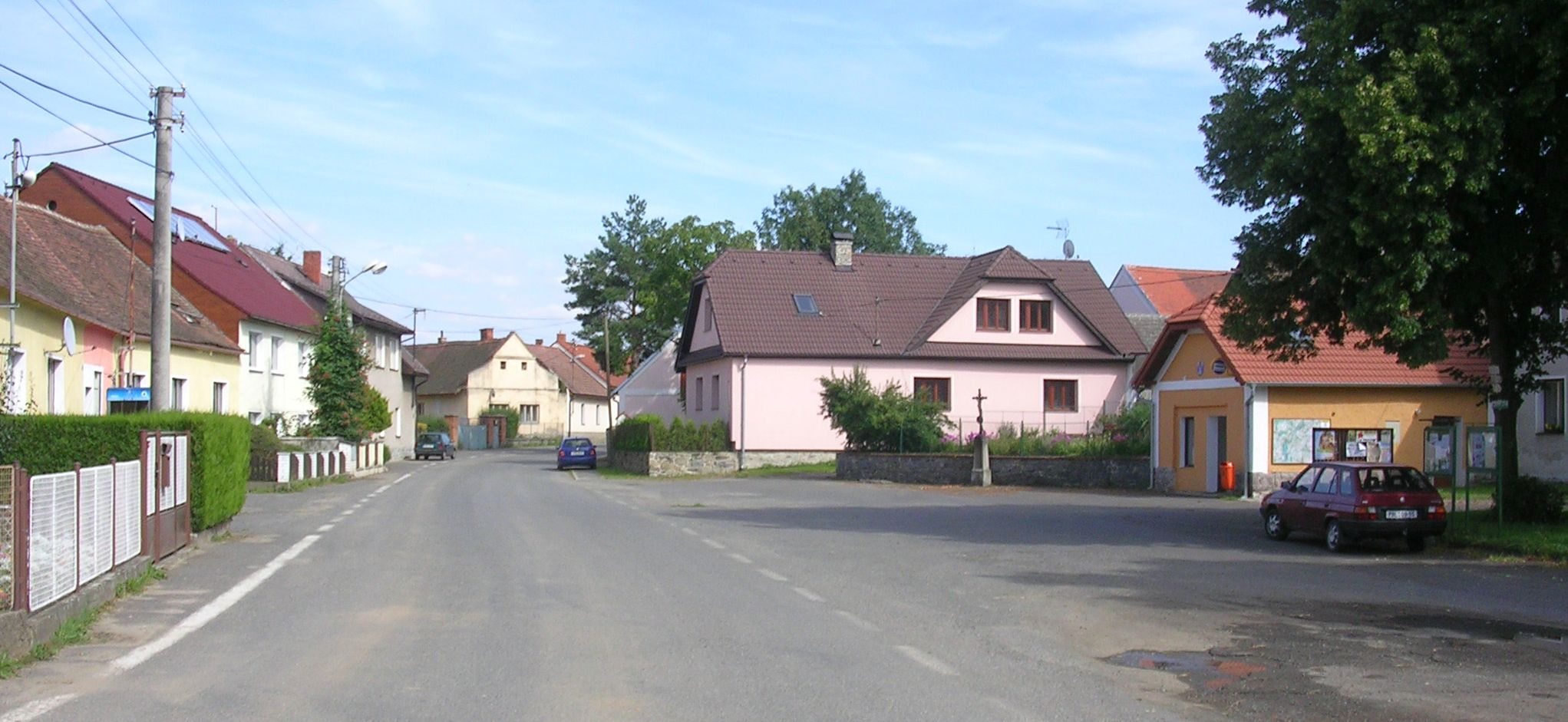
- Centre of Příčovy

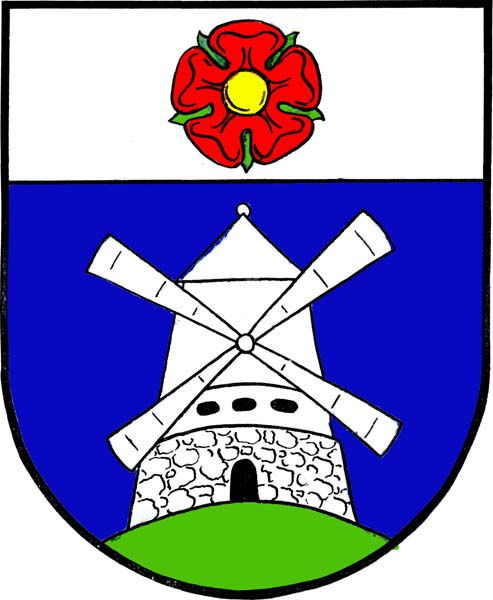
- Flag Coat of arms

- Location in the Czech Republic
- Coordinates: 49°40′22″N 14°23′23″E
- Country: Czech Republic
- Region: Central Bohemian
- District: Příbram
- First mentioned: 1365

Area
  - Total: 3.09 km^{2} (1.19 sq mi)
- Elevation: 360 m (1,180 ft)

Population (2026-01-01)
  - Total: 360
  - Density: 120/km^{2} (300/sq mi)
- Time zone: UTC+1 (CET)
  - Summer (DST): UTC+2 (CEST)
- Postal code: 264 01
- Website: www.pricovy.cz

Příčovy is a municipality and village in Příbram District in the Central Bohemian Region of the Czech Republic. It has about 400 inhabitants.

== History ==
The first written mention of Příčovy is from 1365.

== Demographics ==
Historical population
Year	Pop.	±%
1869	319	—
1880	320	+0.3%
1890	339	+5.9%
1900	285	−15.9%
1910	280	−1.8%
1921	304	+8.6%
1930	316	+3.9%
1950	232	−26.6%
1961	247	+6.5%
1970	227	−8.1%
1980	221	−2.6%
1991	228	+3.2%
2001	250	+9.6%
2011	283	+13.2%
2021	343	+21.2%
Source: Censuses
