= Jalubí =

- Municipality
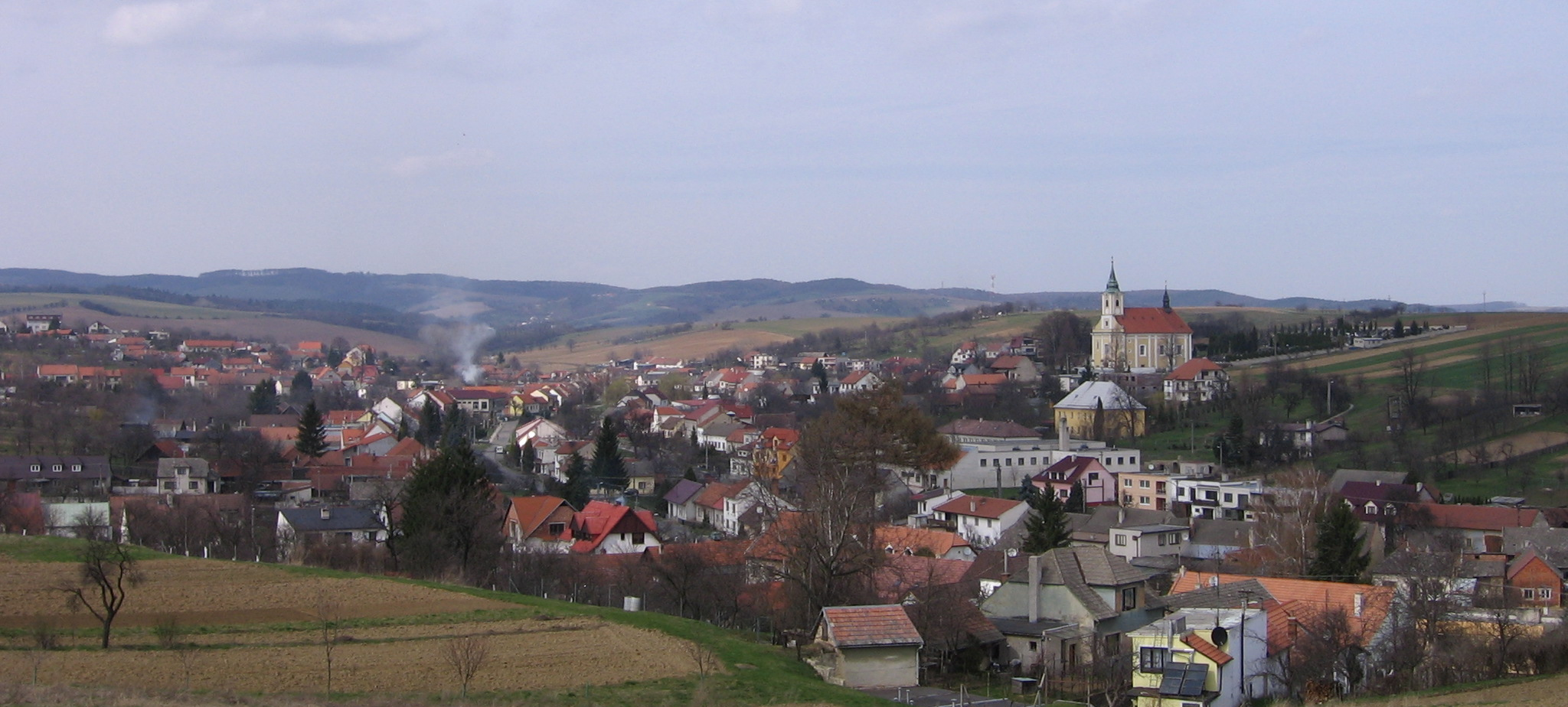
- General view of Jalubí

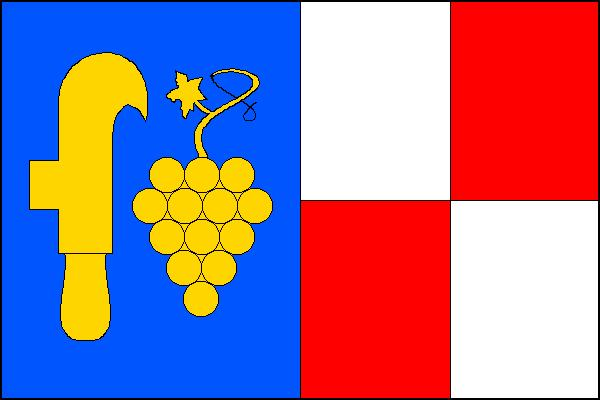
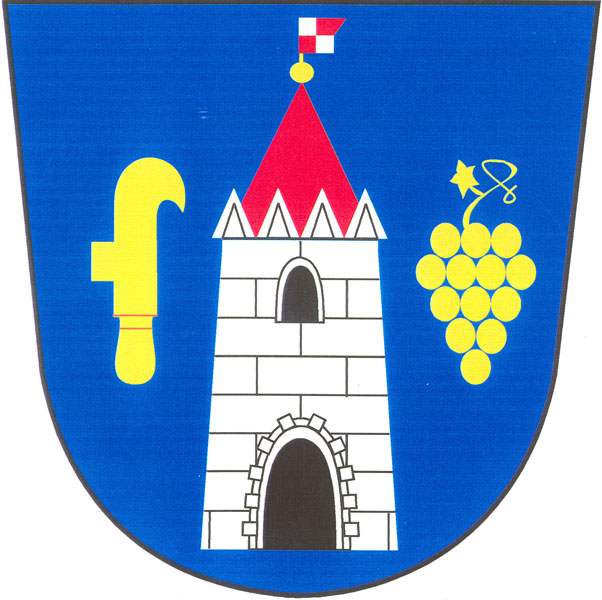
- Flag Coat of arms

- Location in the Czech Republic
- Coordinates: 49°6′59″N 17°25′40″E
- Country: Czech Republic
- Region: Zlín
- District: Uherské Hradiště
- First mentioned: 1265

Area
  - Total: 8.06 km^{2} (3.11 sq mi)
- Elevation: 218 m (715 ft)

Population (2026-01-01)
  - Total: 1,813
  - Density: 225/km^{2} (583/sq mi)
- Time zone: UTC+1 (CET)
  - Summer (DST): UTC+2 (CEST)
- Postal code: 687 05
- Website: www.jalubi.eu

Jalubí is a municipality and village in Uherské Hradiště District in the Zlín Region of the Czech Republic. It has about 1,800 inhabitants.

== Etymology ==
The origin of the name is unknown. The name appeared in the oldest documents as Gelube.

== Geography ==
Jalubí is located about 6 kilometres (4 mi) north of Uherské Hradiště and 20 km (12 mi) southwest of Zlín. It lies on the border of the Kyjov Hills and Chřiby highlands. The highest point is at 349 m (1,145 ft) above sea level. The built-up area lies in the valley of the stream Jalubský potok.

== History ==
The first written mention of Jalubí is in a deed of bishop Bruno von Schauenburg from 1265. From 1265 to 1546, the village was owned by the monastery in Velehrad. In 1547, Jalubí was acquired by the Zierotin family. From 1621, the village was again a property of the Velehrad Monastery. In the early 18th century, the village became known for its pottery, and its products were sold outside the region.

== Demographics ==
Historical population

Year	Pop.	±%
1869	1,334	—
1880	1,450	+8.7%
1890	1,430	−1.4%
1900	1,616	+13.0%
1910	1,763	+9.1%

Year	Pop.	±%
1921	1,880	+6.6%
1930	1,796	−4.5%
1950	1,943	+8.2%
1961	2,061	+6.1%
1970	1,925	−6.6%

Year	Pop.	±%
1980	1,812	−5.9%
1991	1,709	−5.7%
2001	1,739	+1.8%
2011	1,740	+0.1%
2021	1,747	+0.4%

Source: Censuses

== Transport ==
There are no railways or major roads passing through the municipal territory, but the D55 motorway runs just outside the municipality.

== Sights ==
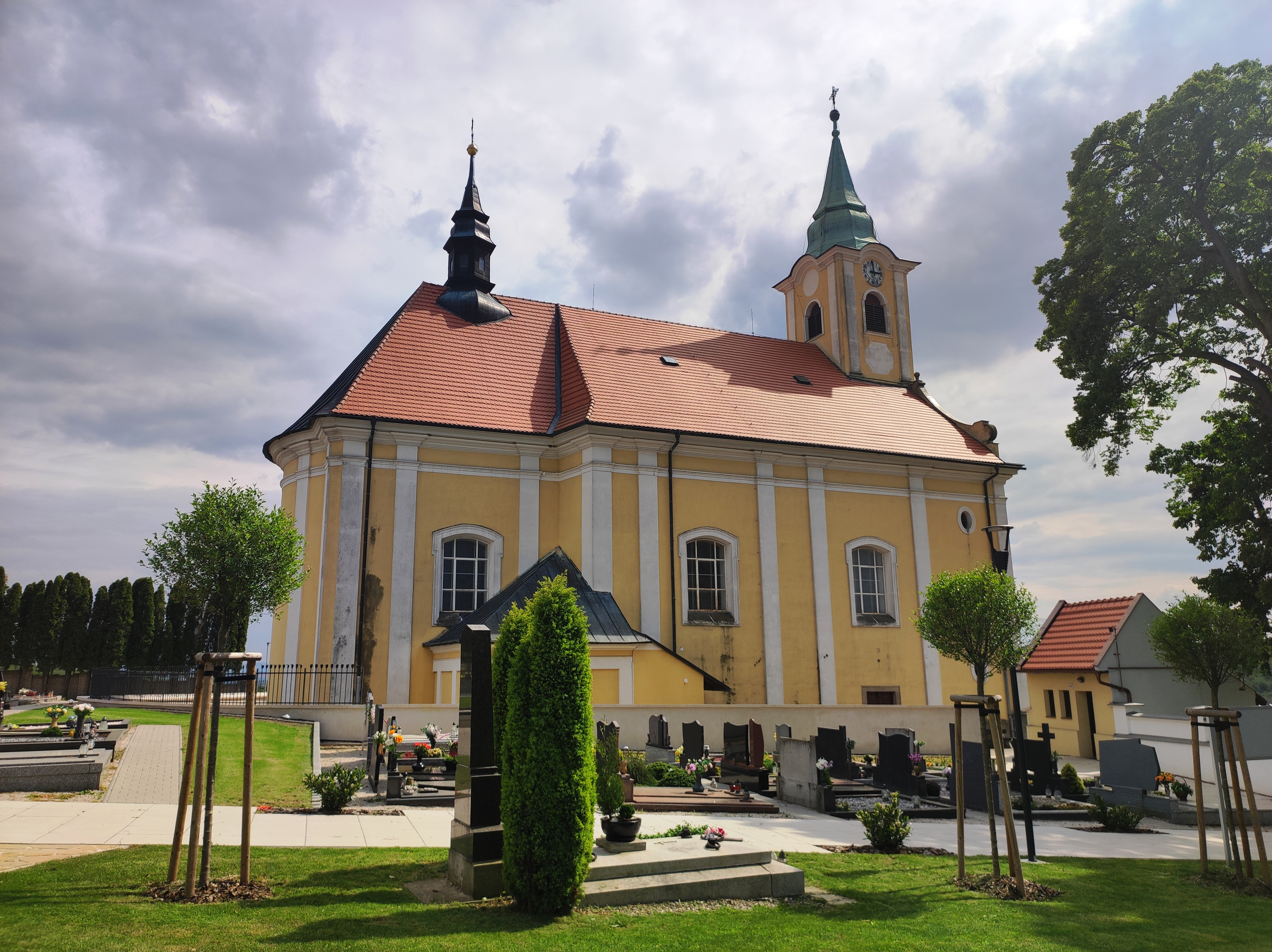
Church of Saint John the Baptist

The main landmark of Jalubí is the Church of Saint John the Baptist. It was built in the late Baroque style, probably in 1763 (consecrated in 1764). It has been preserved without further modification to this day. The interior contains valuable furniture and decotration from the 18th century that was the work of prominent artists, including painter Ignác Raab.

A tourist attraction is a replica of a windmill. It was built in 2007–2009 and stands on the site of a mill destroyed by a bomb at the end of World War II.
