= Ludmírov =

- Municipality
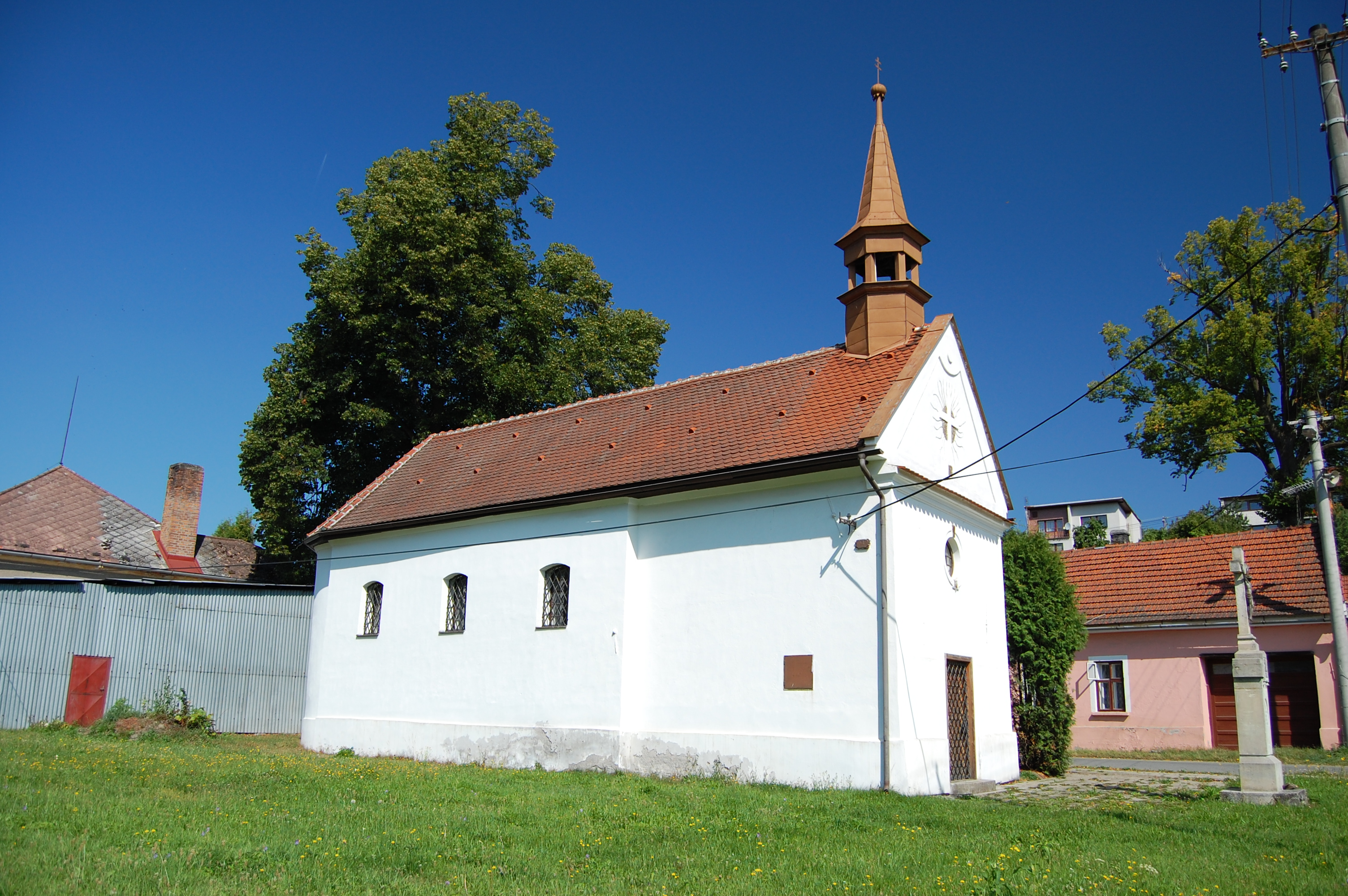
- Chapel of Saint Anne

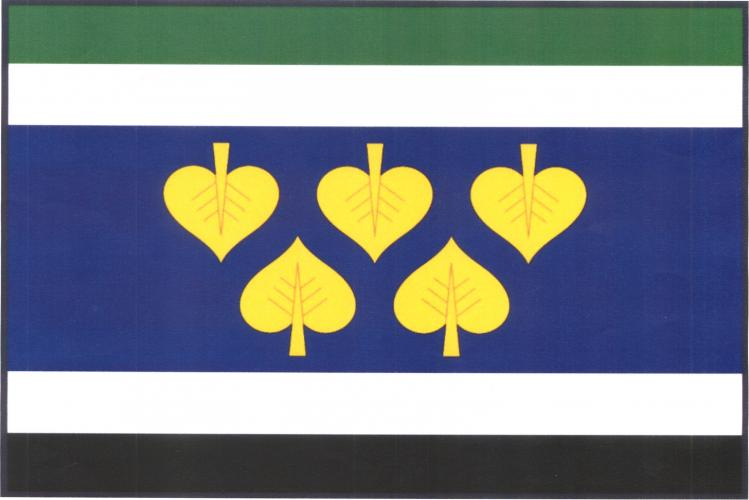
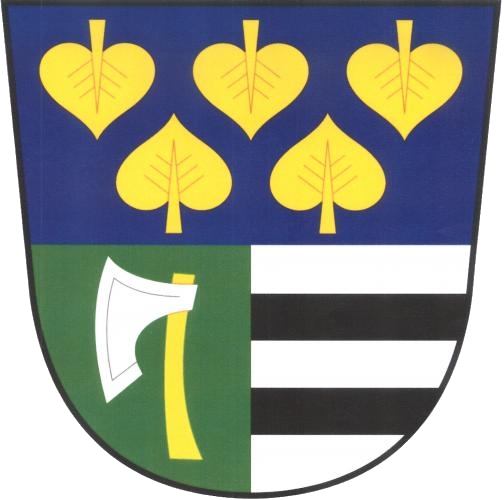
- Flag Coat of arms

- Location in the Czech Republic
- Coordinates: 49°38′29″N 16°52′24″E
- Country: Czech Republic
- Region: Olomouc
- District: Prostějov
- First mentioned: 1382

Area
  - Total: 15.04 km^{2} (5.81 sq mi)
- Elevation: 458 m (1,503 ft)

Population (2026-01-01)
  - Total: 537
  - Density: 35.7/km^{2} (92.5/sq mi)
- Time zone: UTC+1 (CET)
  - Summer (DST): UTC+2 (CEST)
- Postal codes: 798 52, 798 55
- Website: www.ludmirov.cz

Ludmírov is a municipality and village in Prostějov District in the Olomouc Region of the Czech Republic. It has about 500 inhabitants.

Ludmírov lies approximately 26 kilometres (16 mi) north-west of Prostějov, 28 km (17 mi) west of Olomouc, and 183 km (114 mi) east of Prague.

== Administrative division ==
Ludmírov consists of five municipal parts (in brackets population according to the 2021 census):

- Ludmírov (175)
- Dětkovice (49)
- Milkov (68)
- Ospělov (67)
- Ponikev (134)

== Demographics ==
Historical population
Year	Pop.	±%
1869	1,348	—
1880	1,316	−2.4%
1890	1,304	−0.9%
1900	1,275	−2.2%
1910	1,183	−7.2%
1921	1,185	+0.2%
1930	1,095	−7.6%
1950	840	−23.3%
1961	824	−1.9%
1970	728	−11.7%
1980	636	−12.6%
1991	631	−0.8%
2001	585	−7.3%
2011	537	−8.2%
2021	493	−8.2%
Source: Censuses
