= Malé Hradisko =

- Municipality
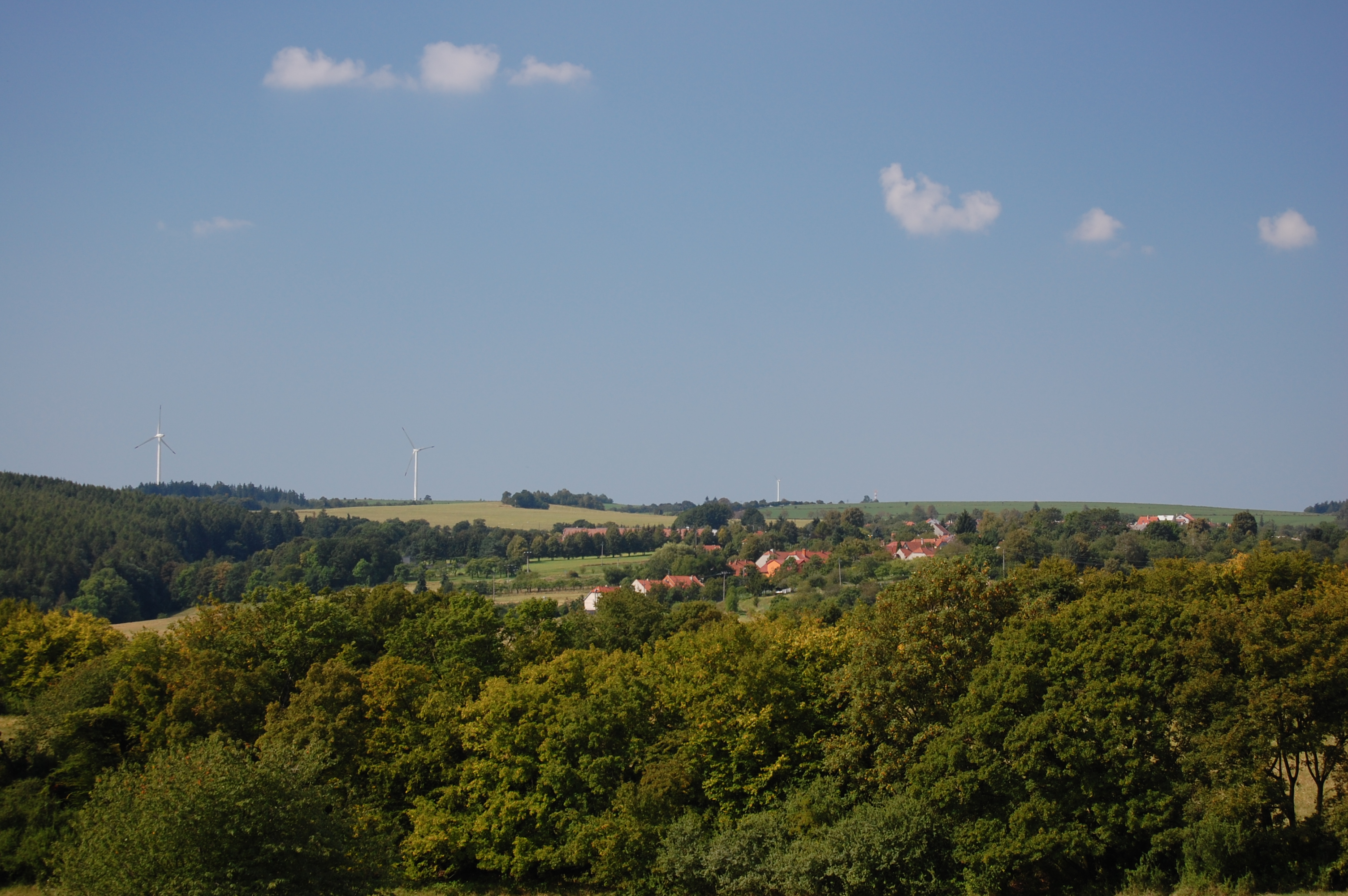
- View from the northeast

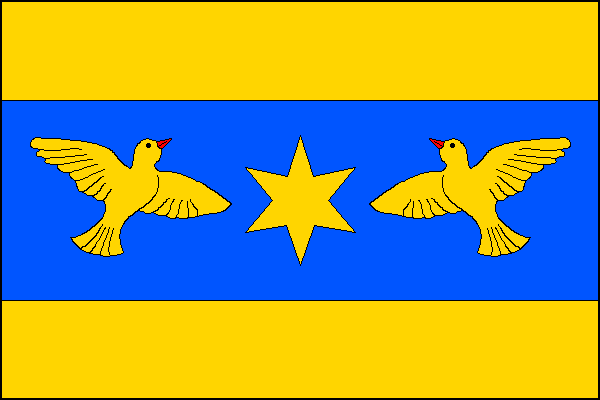
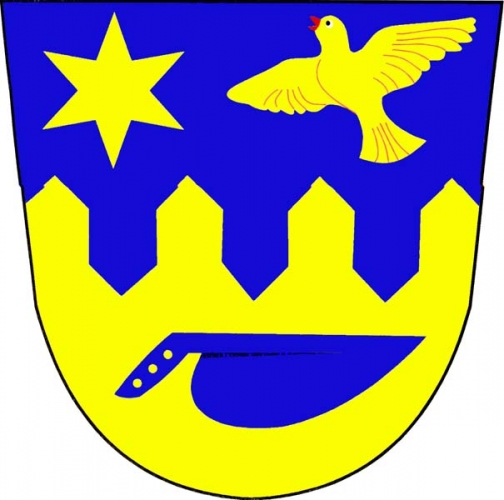
- Flag Coat of arms

- Location in the Czech Republic
- Coordinates: 49°29′36″N 16°52′36″E
- Country: Czech Republic
- Region: Olomouc
- District: Prostějov
- First mentioned: 1358

Area
  - Total: 6.79 km^{2} (2.62 sq mi)
- Elevation: 578 m (1,896 ft)

Population (2026-01-01)
  - Total: 367
  - Density: 54.1/km^{2} (140/sq mi)
- Time zone: UTC+1 (CET)
  - Summer (DST): UTC+2 (CEST)
- Postal codes: 798 03, 798 49
- Website: www.malehradisko.cz

Malé Hradisko is a municipality and village in Prostějov District in the Olomouc Region of the Czech Republic. It has about 400 inhabitants.

Malé Hradisko lies approximately 18 kilometres (11 mi) west of Prostějov, 30 km (19 mi) west of Olomouc, and 189 km (117 mi) east of Prague.

== Administrative division ==
Malé Hradisko consists of two municipal parts (in brackets population according to the 2021 census):

- Malé Hradisko (352)
- Okluky (15)

== Demographics ==
Historical population
Year	Pop.	±%
1869	954	—
1880	988	+3.6%
1890	1,005	+1.7%
1900	1,103	+9.8%
1910	1,012	−8.3%
1921	957	−5.4%
1930	891	−6.9%
1950	724	−18.7%
1961	762	+5.2%
1970	668	−12.3%
1980	567	−15.1%
1991	460	−18.9%
2001	414	−10.0%
2011	369	−10.9%
2021	367	−0.5%
Source: Censuses
