= Partutovice =

- Municipality
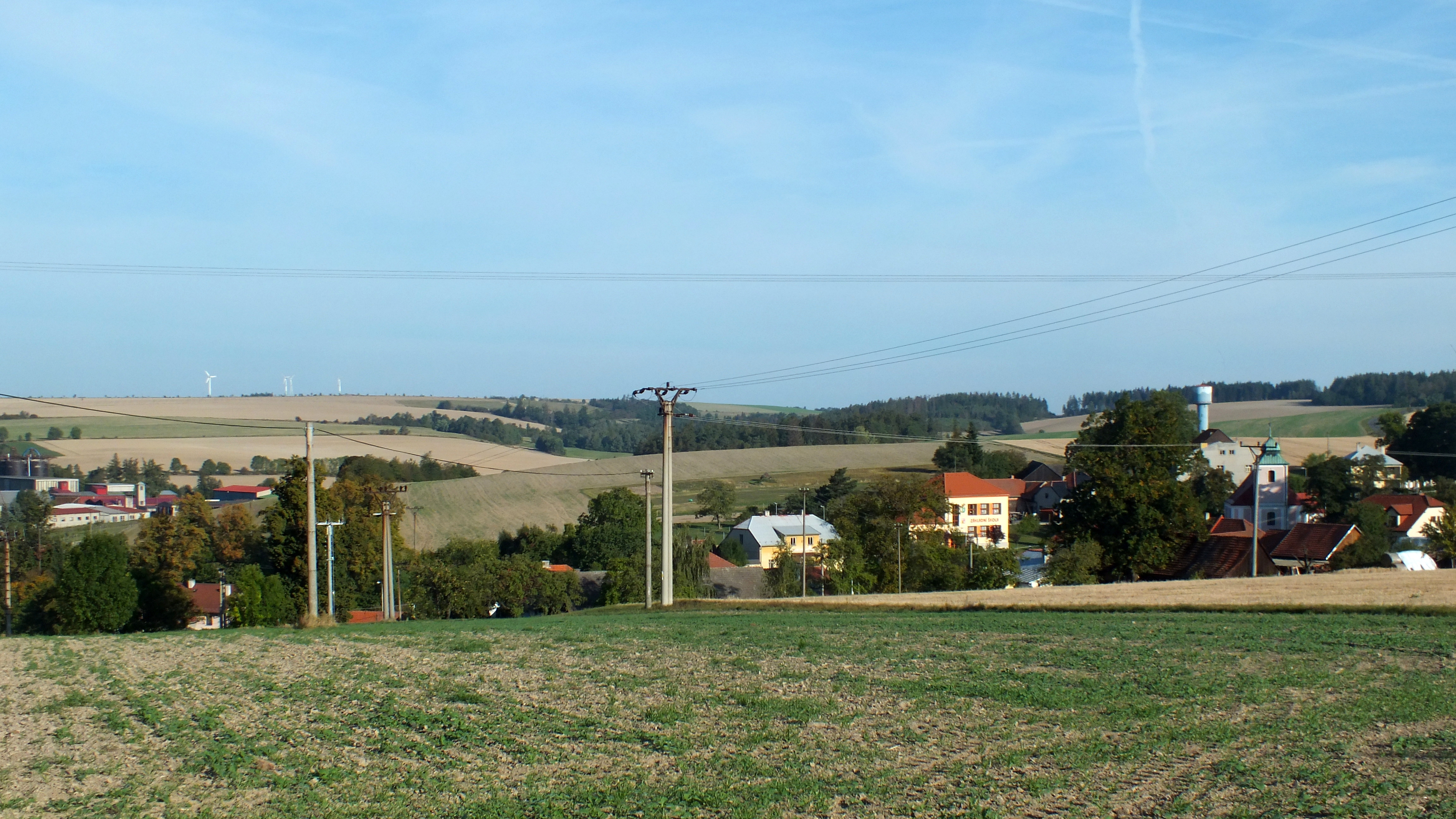
- View from the south

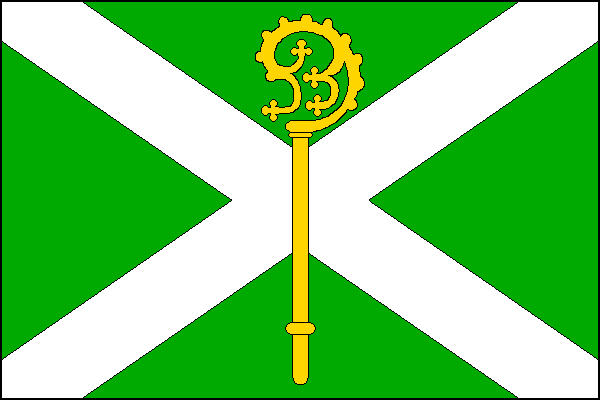
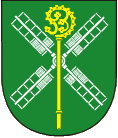
- Flag Coat of arms

- Location in the Czech Republic
- Coordinates: 49°37′53″N 17°42′29″E
- Country: Czech Republic
- Region: Olomouc
- District: Přerov
- First mentioned: 1412

Area
  - Total: 10.08 km^{2} (3.89 sq mi)
- Elevation: 410 m (1,350 ft)

Population (2026-01-01)
  - Total: 533
  - Density: 52.9/km^{2} (137/sq mi)
- Time zone: UTC+1 (CET)
  - Summer (DST): UTC+2 (CEST)
- Postal code: 753 01
- Website: www.partutovice.cz

Partutovice (German: Bartelsdorf) is a municipality and village in Přerov District in the Olomouc Region of the Czech Republic. It has about 500 inhabitants.

Partutovice lies approximately 27 kilometres (17 mi) north-east of Přerov, 34 km (21 mi) east of Olomouc, and 242 km (150 mi) east of Prague.

== History ==
The first written mention of Partutovice is from 1412.

== Demographics ==
Historical population
Year	Pop.	±%
1869	493	—
1880	458	−7.1%
1890	517	+12.9%
1900	500	−3.3%
1910	499	−0.2%
1921	504	+1.0%
1930	484	−4.0%
1950	406	−16.1%
1961	449	+10.6%
1970	419	−6.7%
1980	452	+7.9%
1991	476	+5.3%
2001	486	+2.1%
2011	496	+2.1%
2021	480	−3.2%
Source: Censuses

== Sights ==
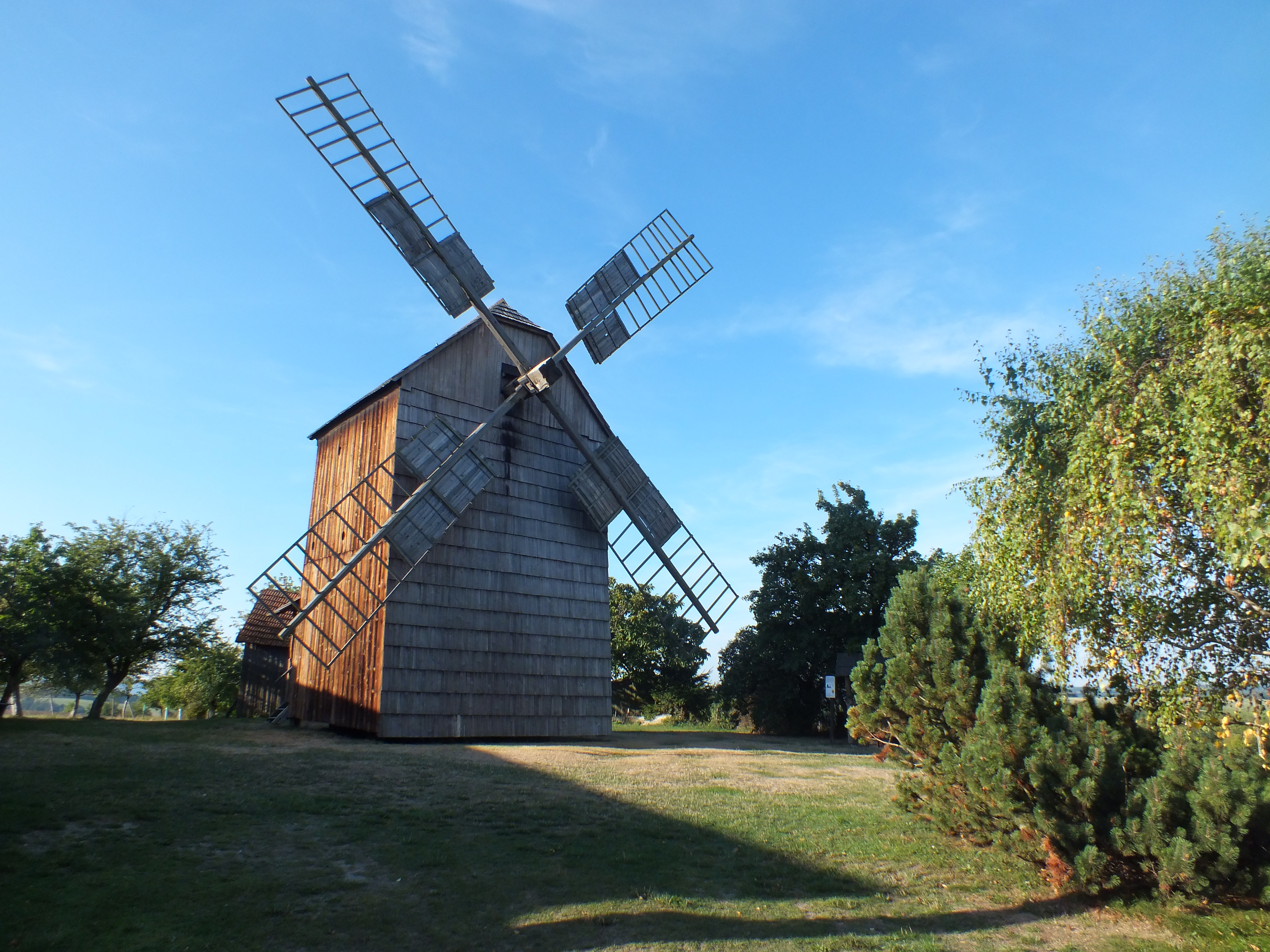
Windmill

The main landmark of Partutovice is a wooden windmill built in 1837.
