= Němčice (Blansko District) =

- Municipality
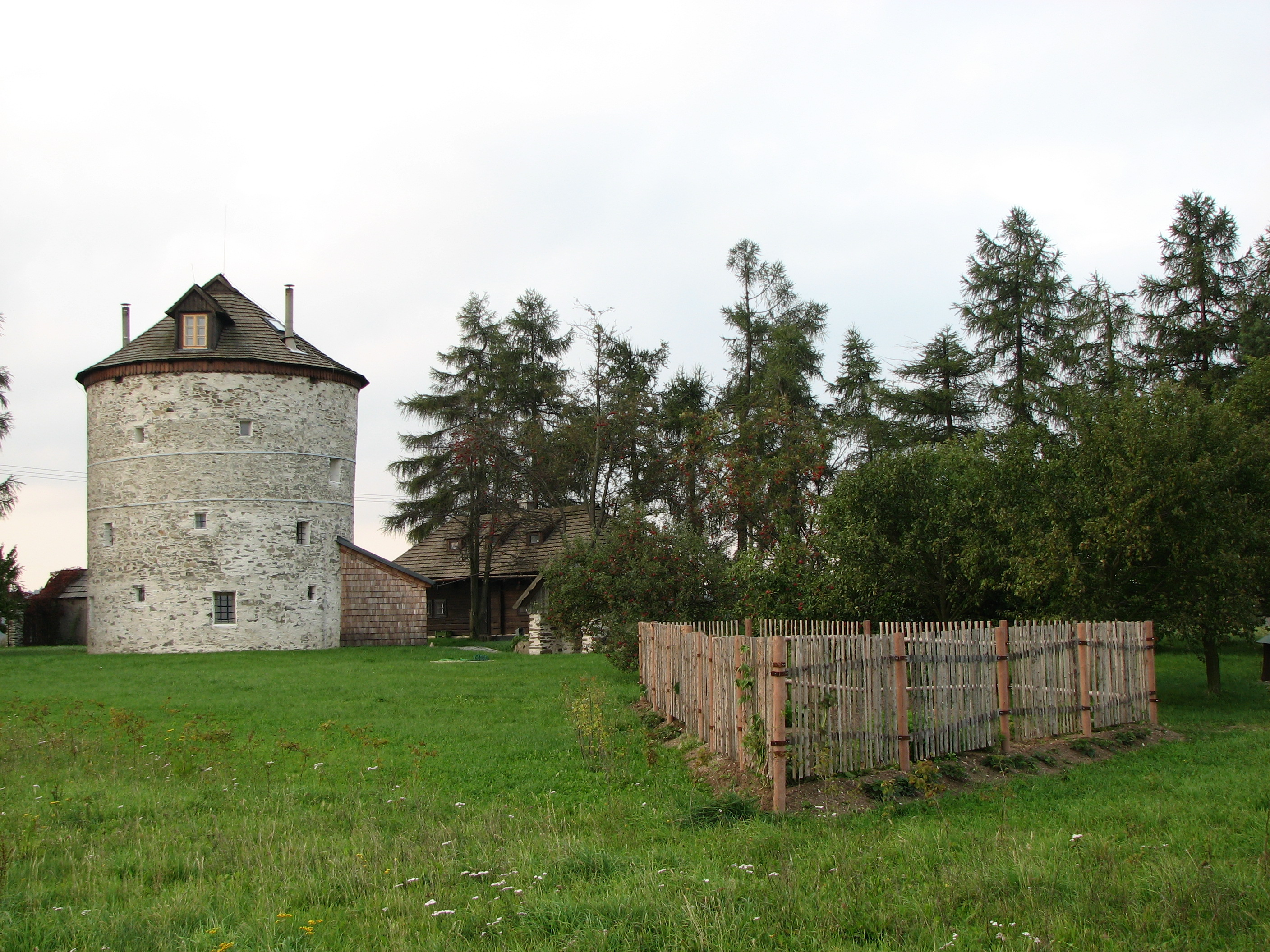
- Windmill, a cultural monument

- Flag Coat of arms

- Location in the Czech Republic
- Coordinates: 49°27′0″N 16°43′5″E
- Country: Czech Republic
- Region: South Moravian
- District: Blansko
- First mentioned: 1358

Area
  - Total: 7.39 km^{2} (2.85 sq mi)
- Elevation: 613 m (2,011 ft)

Population (2026-01-01)
  - Total: 464
  - Density: 62.8/km^{2} (163/sq mi)
- Time zone: UTC+1 (CET)
  - Summer (DST): UTC+2 (CEST)
- Postal code: 679 51
- Website: www.nemcice.eu

Němčice is a municipality and village in Blansko District in the South Moravian Region of the Czech Republic. It has about 500 inhabitants.

Němčice lies approximately 10 kilometres (6 mi) north-east of Blansko, 29 km (18 mi) north of Brno, and 179 km (111 mi) south-east of Prague.

== Demographics ==
Historical population
Year	Pop.	±%
1869	621	—
1880	611	−1.6%
1890	604	−1.1%
1900	650	+7.6%
1910	719	+10.6%
1921	636	−11.5%
1930	664	+4.4%
1950	613	−7.7%
1961	588	−4.1%
1970	540	−8.2%
1980	504	−6.7%
1991	439	−12.9%
2001	444	+1.1%
2011	434	−2.3%
2021	448	+3.2%
Source: Censuses
