= Hačky =

- Municipality
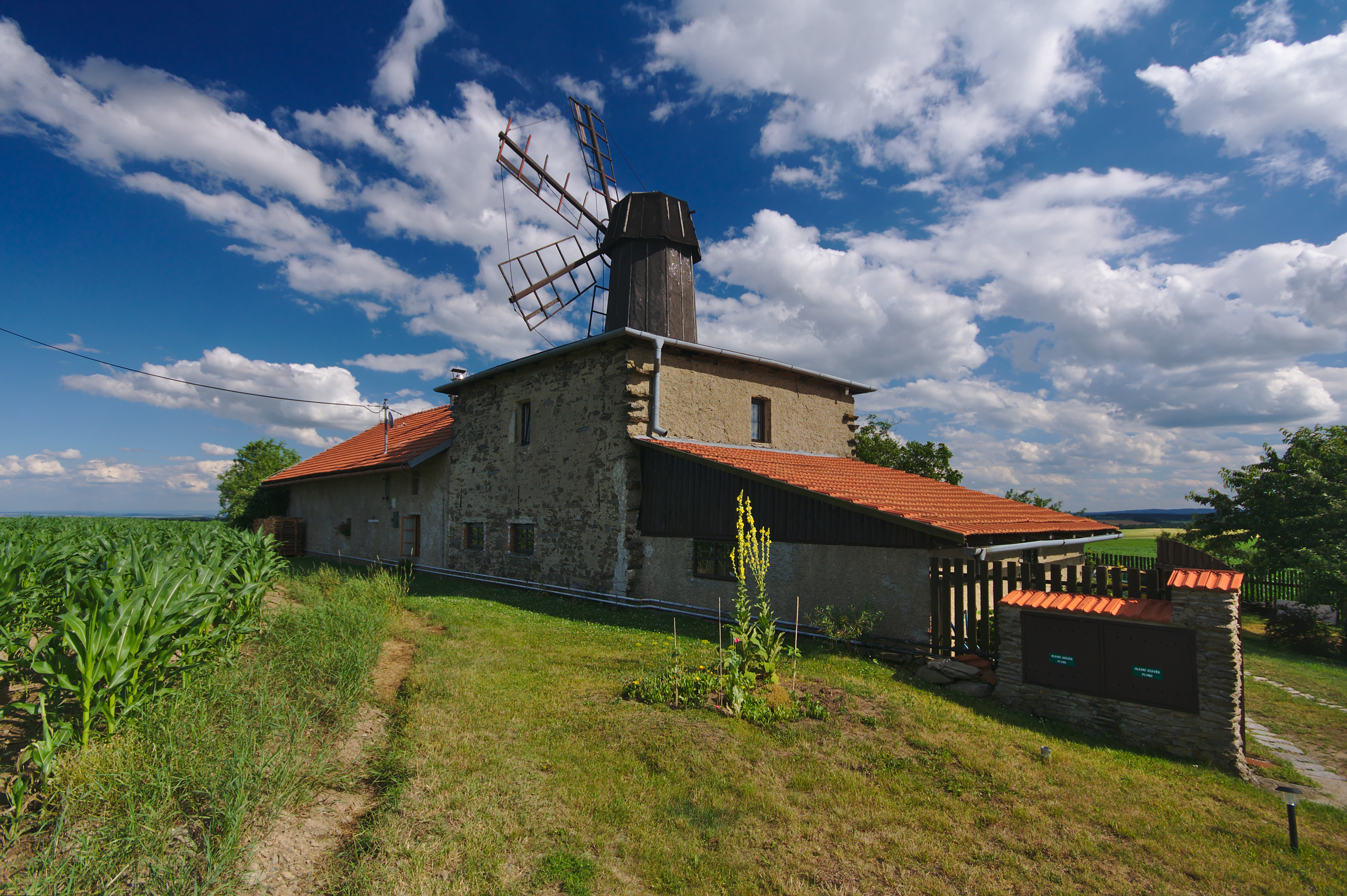
- Windmill

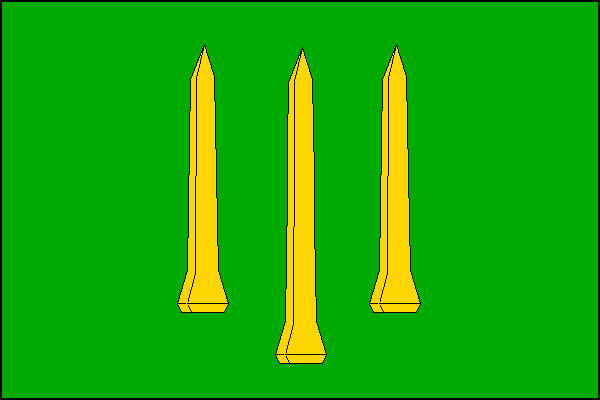
- Flag Coat of arms

- Location in the Czech Republic
- Coordinates: 49°37′21″N 16°56′16″E
- Country: Czech Republic
- Region: Olomouc
- District: Prostějov
- First mentioned: 1318

Area
  - Total: 2.68 km^{2} (1.03 sq mi)
- Elevation: 473 m (1,552 ft)

Population (2026-01-01)
  - Total: 104
  - Density: 38.8/km^{2} (101/sq mi)
- Time zone: UTC+1 (CET)
  - Summer (DST): UTC+2 (CEST)
- Postal code: 798 55
- Website: www.hacky.cz

Hačky is a municipality and village in Prostějov District in the Olomouc Region of the Czech Republic. It has about 100 inhabitants.

Hačky lies approximately 21 kilometres (13 mi) north-west of Prostějov, 23 km (14 mi) west of Olomouc, and 188 km (117 mi) east of Prague.

== Demographics ==
Historical population
Year	Pop.	±%
1869	253	—
1880	250	−1.2%
1890	272	+8.8%
1900	249	−8.5%
1910	236	−5.2%
1921	259	+9.7%
1930	264	+1.9%
1950	194	−26.5%
1961	215	+10.8%
1970	180	−16.3%
1980	152	−15.6%
1991	115	−24.3%
2001	99	−13.9%
2011	104	+5.1%
2021	111	+6.7%
Source: Censuses
