= Dětkovice (Prostějov District) =

- Municipality
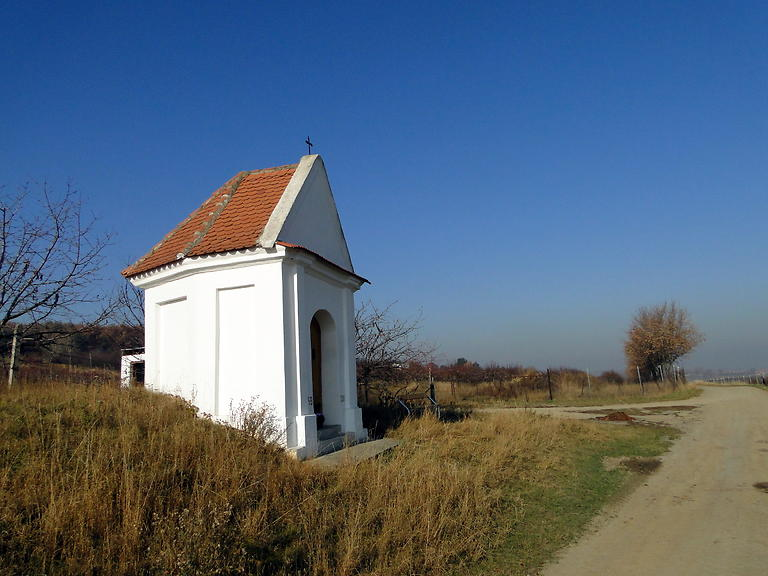
- Chapel of Saint Anne

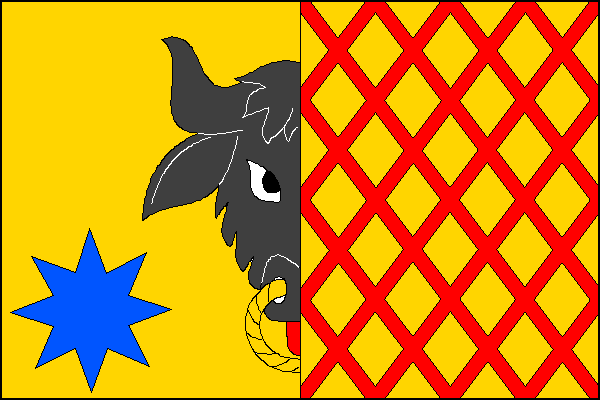
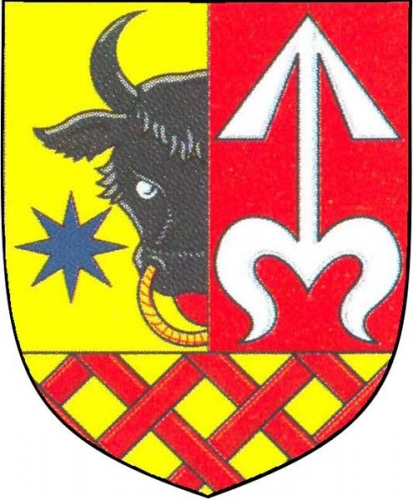
- Flag Coat of arms

- Location in the Czech Republic
- Coordinates: 49°24′55″N 17°4′56″E
- Country: Czech Republic
- Region: Olomouc
- District: Prostějov
- First mentioned: 1355

Area
  - Total: 5.33 km^{2} (2.06 sq mi)
- Elevation: 244 m (801 ft)

Population (2026-01-01)
  - Total: 535
  - Density: 100/km^{2} (260/sq mi)
- Time zone: UTC+1 (CET)
  - Summer (DST): UTC+2 (CEST)
- Postal code: 798 04
- Website: detkoviceupv.cz

Dětkovice is a municipality and village in Prostějov District in the Olomouc Region of the Czech Republic. It has about 500 inhabitants.

Dětkovice lies approximately 7 kilometres (4 mi) south of Prostějov, 24 km (15 mi) south-west of Olomouc, and 206 km (128 mi) east of Prague.

== Demographics ==
Historical population
Year	Pop.	±%
1869	616	—
1880	670	+8.8%
1890	663	−1.0%
1900	629	−5.1%
1910	670	+6.5%
1921	641	−4.3%
1930	617	−3.7%
1950	557	−9.7%
1961	556	−0.2%
1970	542	−2.5%
1980	497	−8.3%
1991	471	−5.2%
2001	448	−4.9%
2011	533	+19.0%
2021	535	+0.4%
Source: Censuses
