= Pacetluky =

- Municipality
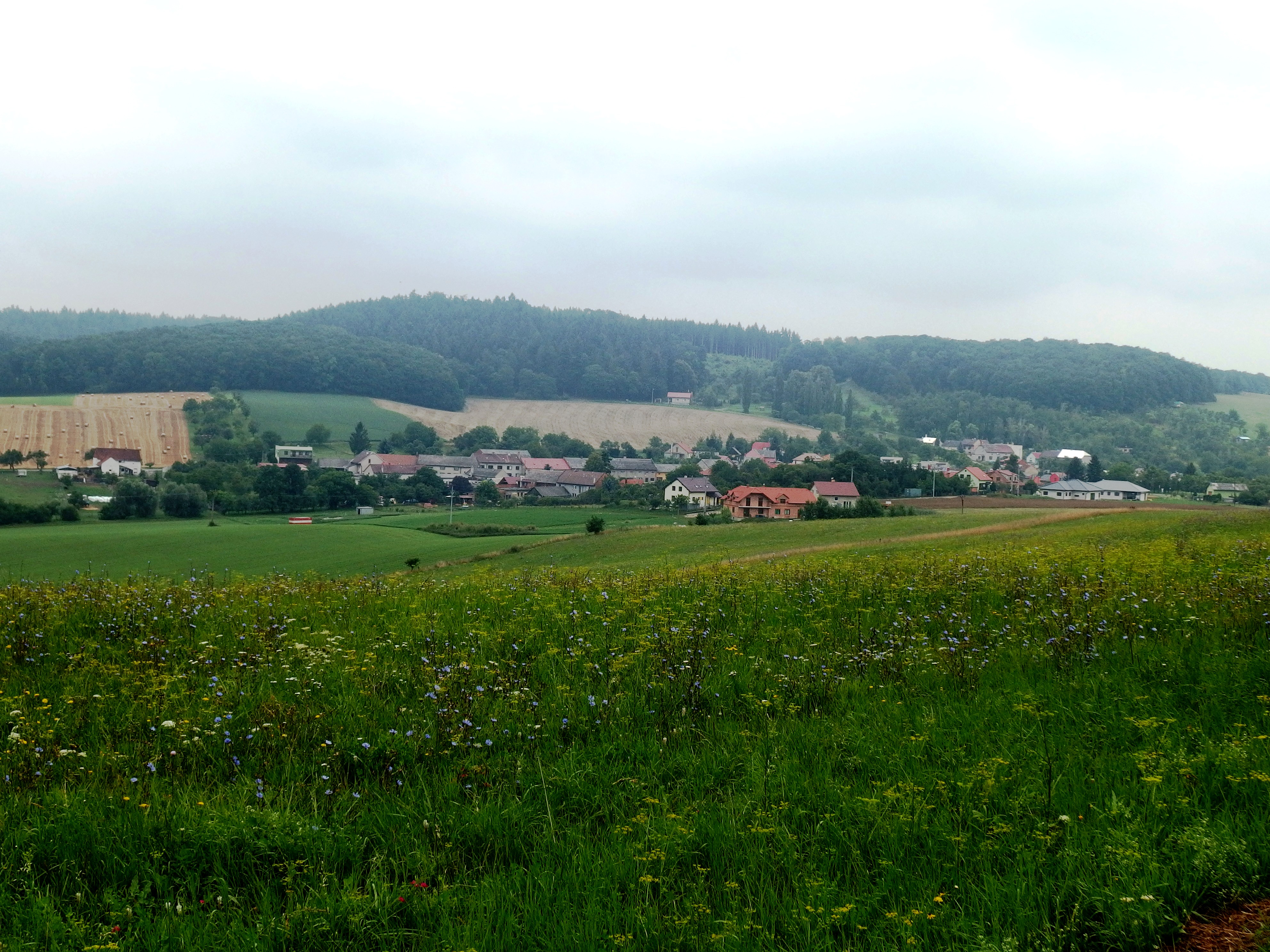
- General view

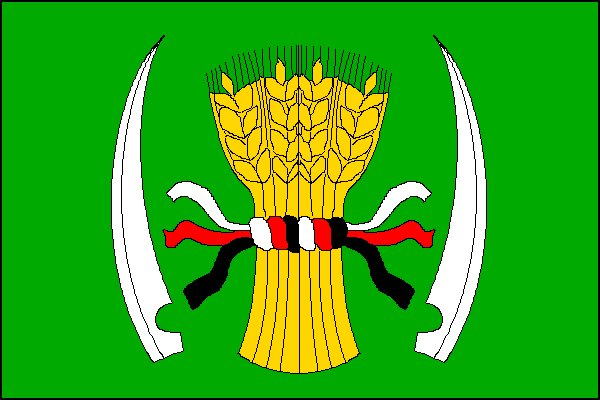
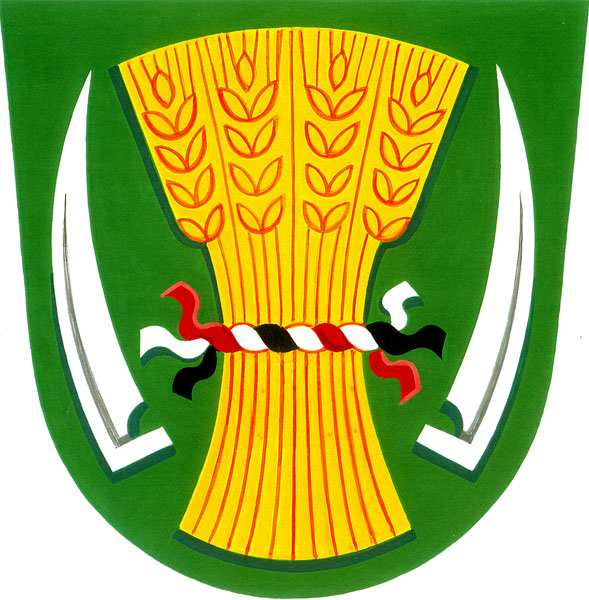
- Flag Coat of arms

- Location in the Czech Republic
- Coordinates: 49°22′46″N 17°33′57″E
- Country: Czech Republic
- Region: Zlín
- District: Kroměříž
- First mentioned: 1141

Area
  - Total: 2.56 km^{2} (0.99 sq mi)
- Elevation: 277 m (909 ft)

Population (2026-01-01)
  - Total: 250
  - Density: 98/km^{2} (250/sq mi)
- Time zone: UTC+1 (CET)
  - Summer (DST): UTC+2 (CEST)
- Postal code: 768 43
- Website: www.pacetluky.cz

Pacetluky is a municipality and village in Kroměříž District in the Zlín Region of the Czech Republic. It has about 300 inhabitants.

Pacetluky lies approximately 16 kilometres (10 mi) north-east of Kroměříž, 19 km (12 mi) north-west of Zlín, and 240 km (150 mi) east of Prague.

== Demographics ==
Historical population
Year	Pop.	±%
1869	243	—
1880	252	+3.7%
1890	259	+2.8%
1900	302	+16.6%
1910	286	−5.3%
1921	286	+0.0%
1930	299	+4.5%
1950	267	−10.7%
1961	312	+16.9%
1970	291	−6.7%
1980	272	−6.5%
1991	242	−11.0%
2001	223	−7.9%
2011	214	−4.0%
2021	212	−0.9%
Source: Censuses
