= Romže =

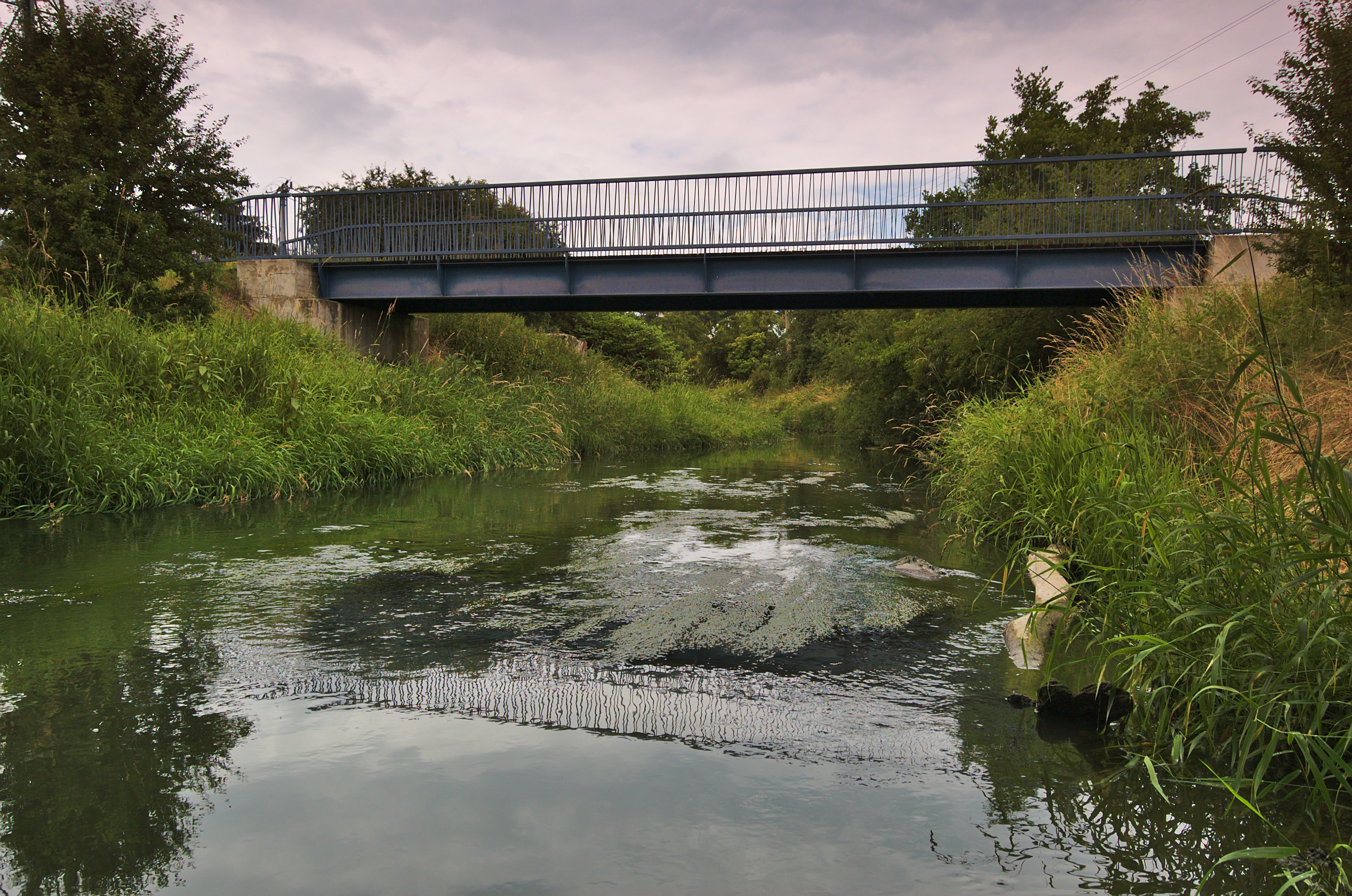
- The Romže near Bedihošť

Location
- Country: Czech Republic
- Region: Olomouc

Physical characteristics
- Source
  - location: Dzbel, Zábřeh Highlands
  - coordinates: 49°36′43″N 16°51′7″E
  - elevation: 485 m (1,591 ft)
- Mouth
  - location: Morava
  - coordinates: 49°22′28″N 17°18′23″E
  - elevation: 193 m (633 ft)
- Length: 49.6 km (30.8 mi)
- Basin size: 455.7 km^{2} (175.9 sq mi)
- Discharge
  - average: 1.22 m^{3}/s (43 cu ft/s) near estuary

Basin features
- Progression: Morava→ Danube→ Black Sea

The Romže (Czech pronunciation: [ˈromʒɛ]; also called Valová downstream) is a river in the Czech Republic, a right tributary of the Morava River. It flows through the Olomouc Region. It is 49.6 km (30.8 mi) long.

== Etymology ==
The name Romže is derived from the Old High German word runsa, which meant 'bed of the brook'. The river was probably named by German settlers that came to the region in the 13th century. The lower course of the river (after the confluence with the Hloučela in Prostějov) is often called Valová.

== Characteristic ==
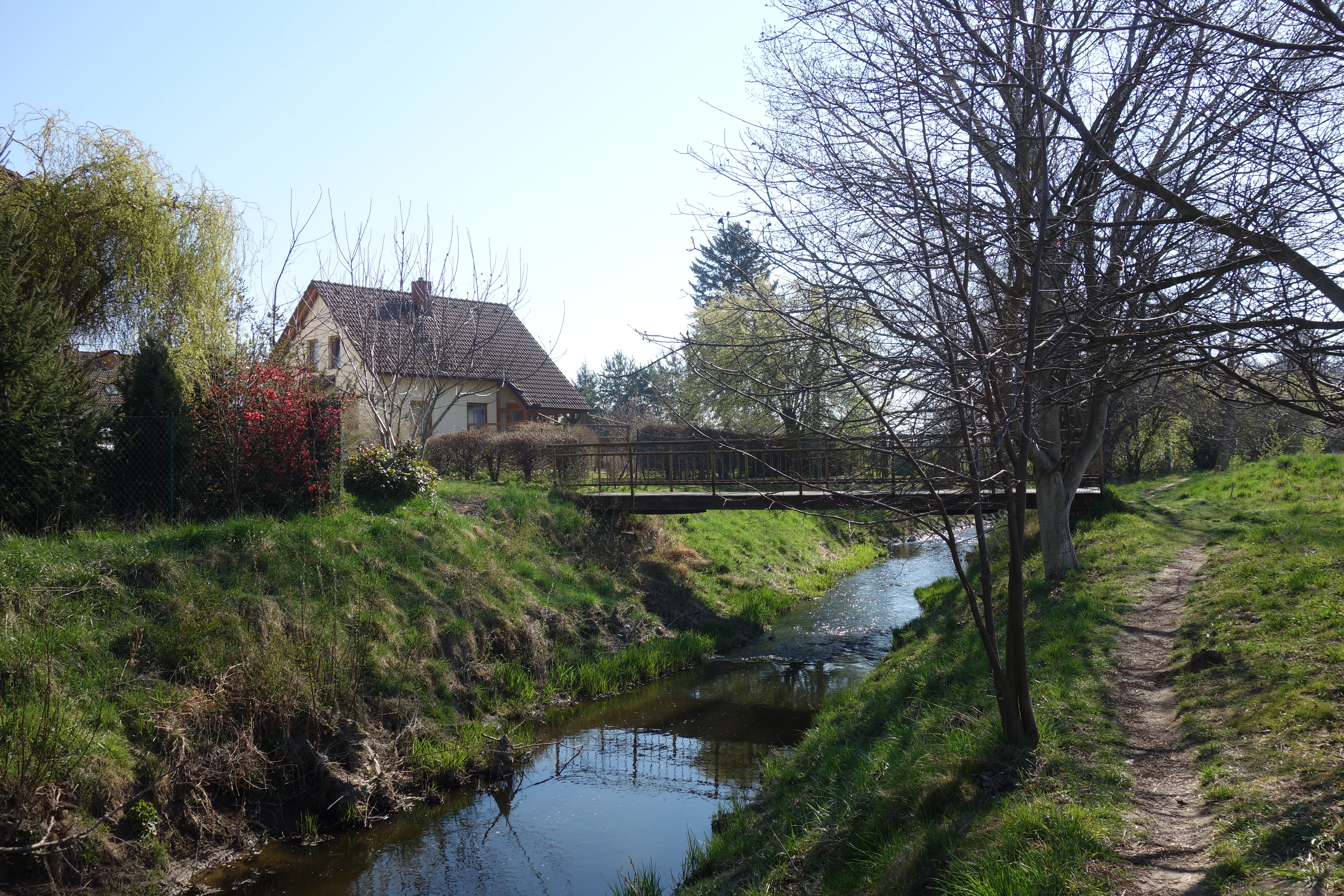
The Romže in Prostějov

The Romže originates in the territory of Dzbel in the Zábřeh Highlands at an elevation of 485 m (1,591 ft) and flows to Uhřičice, where it enters the Morava River at an elevation of 193 m (633 ft). It is 49.6 km (30.8 mi) long. Its drainage basin has an area of 455.7 km^{2} (175.9 sq mi). The average discharge at its mouth is 1.22 m^{3}/s (43 cu ft/s).

The longest tributaries of the Romže are:

Tributary	Length (km)	Side
Hloučela	33.9	right
Český potok	13.7	left
Brodecký potok	10.6	right

== Course ==
The most notable settlement on the river is the city of Prostějov. The river flows through the municipal territories of Dzbel, Jesenec, Konice, Budětsko, Stražisko, Ptení, Zdětín, Hluchov, Bílovice-Lutotín, Kostelec na Hané, Držovice, Smržice, Prostějov, Kralice na Hané, Bedihošť, Čehovice, Hrubčice, Čelčice, Ivaň, Klenovice na Hané, Oplocany, Polkovice, Lobodice and Uhřičice.

== Bodies of water ==
There are 167 bodies of water in the basin area. The largest of them is Plumlov Reservoir with an area of 54.8 ha (135 acres), built on the Hloučela. There are no fishponds or reservoirs built directly on the Romže, but the river feed several small fishponds on the upper course.

== See also ==
- List of rivers of the Czech Republic
