= Kostelec na Hané =

- Town
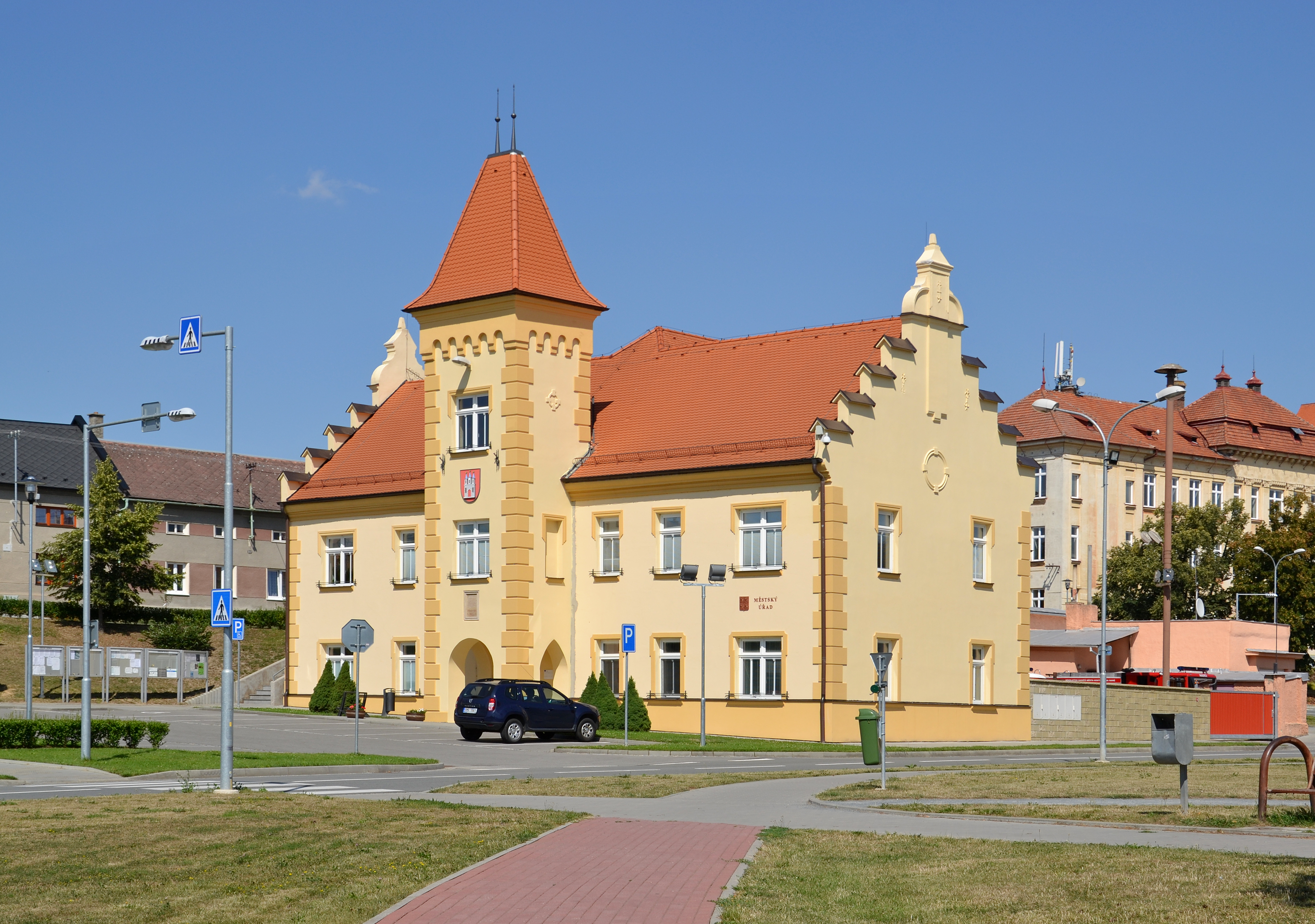
- Town hall

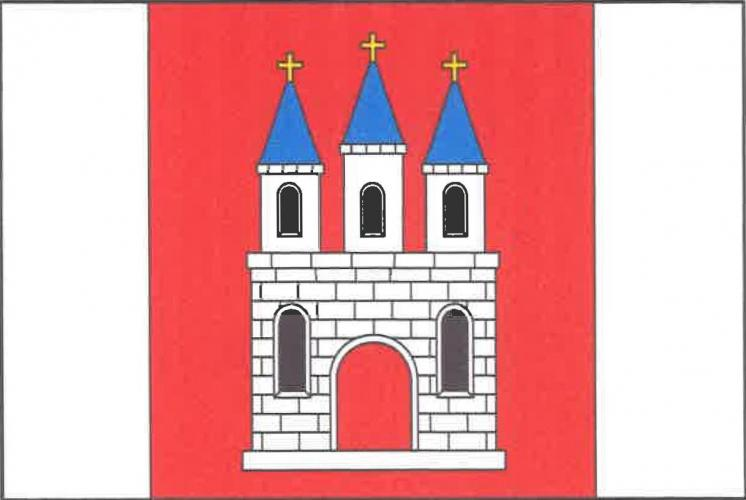
- Flag Coat of arms

- Location in the Czech Republic
- Coordinates: 49°30′50″N 17°3′30″E
- Country: Czech Republic
- Region: Olomouc
- District: Prostějov
- First mentioned: 1141

Government
  - Mayor: Radek Doležel

Area
  - Total: 13.86 km^{2} (5.35 sq mi)
- Elevation: 241 m (791 ft)

Population (2026-01-01)
  - Total: 2,857
  - Density: 206.1/km^{2} (533.9/sq mi)
- Time zone: UTC+1 (CET)
  - Summer (DST): UTC+2 (CEST)
- Postal code: 798 41
- Website: www.kostelecnh.cz

Kostelec na Hané (Czech pronunciation: [ˈkostɛlɛts ˈna ɦanɛː]) is a town in Prostějov District in the Olomouc Region of the Czech Republic. It has about 2,900 inhabitants. The town proper is located on the Romže River in the Upper Morava Valley.

== Geography ==
Kostelec na Hané is located about 5 kilometres (3 mi) northwest of Prostějov and 15 km (9 mi) southwest of Olomouc. It lies mostly in the Upper Morava Valley. A small part of the municipal territory extends into the Zábřeh Highlands and includes the highest point of Kostelec na Hané at 362 m (1,188 ft) above sea level. The Romže River flows through the town.

== History ==
The first written mention of Kostelec na Hané is in a deed of bishop Jindřich Zdík from 1141. In the 13th century, it was owned by Duke Nicholas I as a part of the Plumlov estate. He sold the estate to King John of Bohemia in 1311, who sold it to the Lords of Kravaře in 1325. The Lords of Kravaře held it to 1466. In 1466, the estate was acquired by marriage by Herald of Kunštát, and after his death in 1490 it was acquired by the Pernštejn family. In 1595, the estate passed into possession of the Liechtenstein, who held it until the establishment of an independent municipality in 1848.

== Demographics ==
Historical population

Year	Pop.	±%
1869	1,365	—
1880	1,541	+12.9%
1890	1,745	+13.2%
1900	1,869	+7.1%
1910	2,204	+17.9%

Year	Pop.	±%
1921	2,274	+3.2%
1930	2,804	+23.3%
1950	2,499	−10.9%
1961	2,616	+4.7%
1970	2,454	−6.2%

Year	Pop.	±%
1980	2,785	+13.5%
1991	2,688	−3.5%
2001	2,724	+1.3%
2011	2,791	+2.5%
2021	2,838	+1.7%

Source: Censuses

== Transport ==
Kostelec na Hané is located on the Prostějov–Dzbel railway line.

== Sights ==
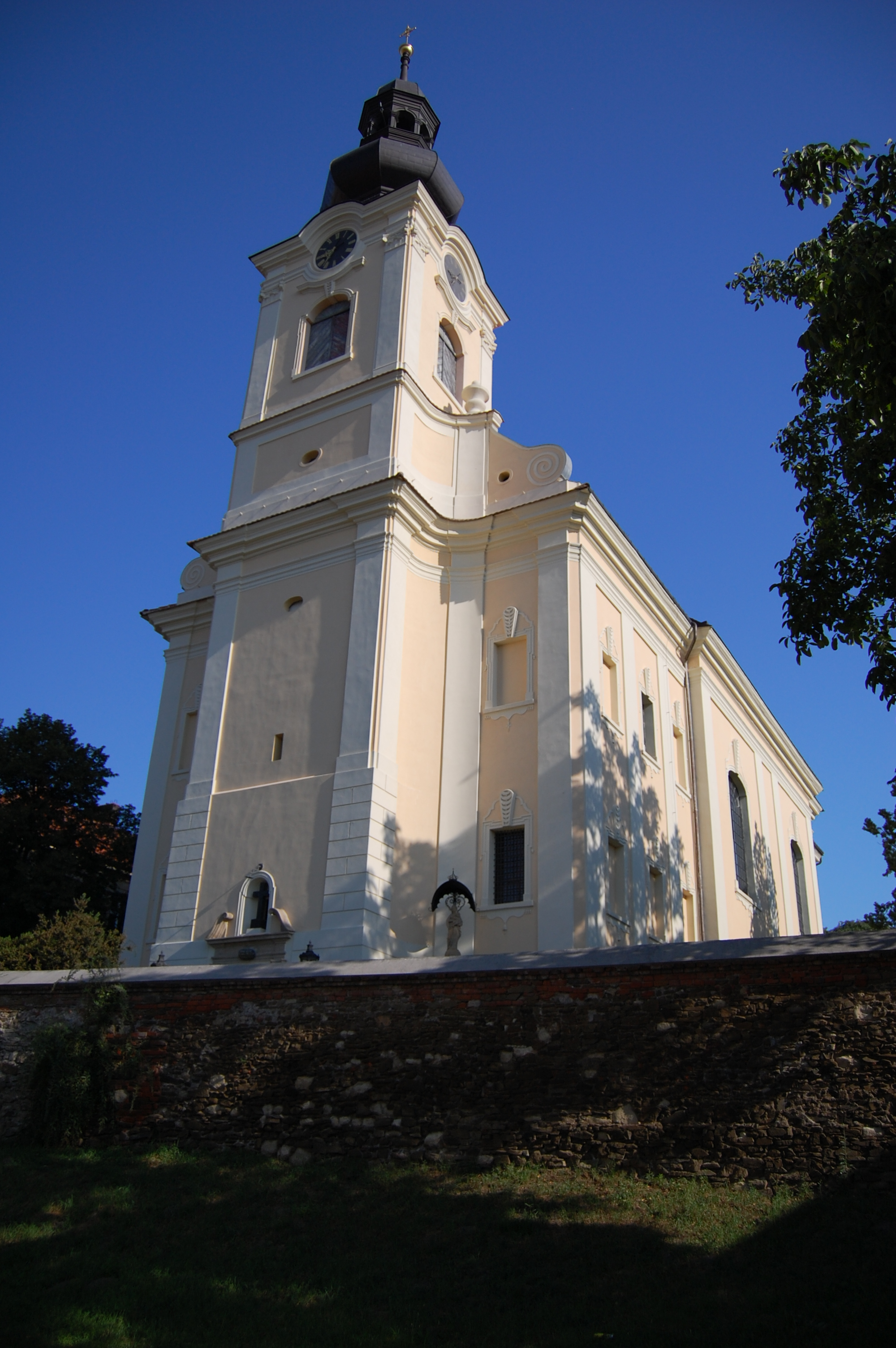
Church of Saint James the Great

The main landmark of Kostelec na Hané is the Church of Saint James the Great. It was built in the Baroque style in 1772.

Červený domek ('red house') is a house where Petr Bezruč lived until his death. Today there is an exposition about his life and work.

== Notable people ==
- Petr Bezruč (1867–1958), poet; lived here in 1939–1958
- Jan Nehera (1899–1958), businessman
- Karel Otáhal (1901–1972), sculptor
