= Stražisko =

- Municipality
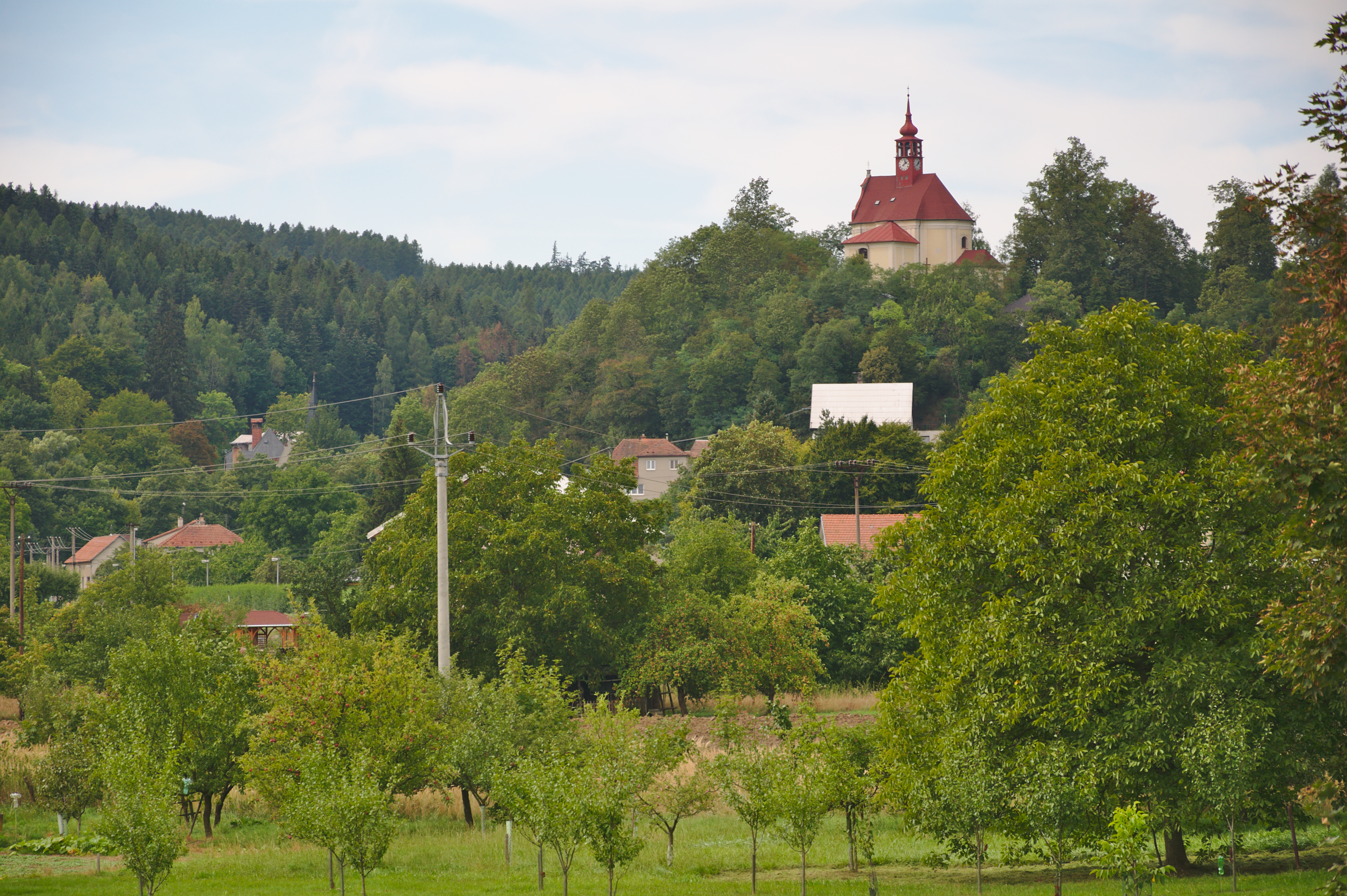
- Church of the Guardian Angels over the village

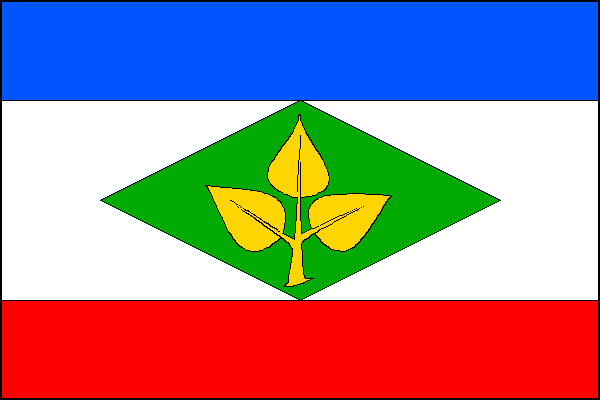
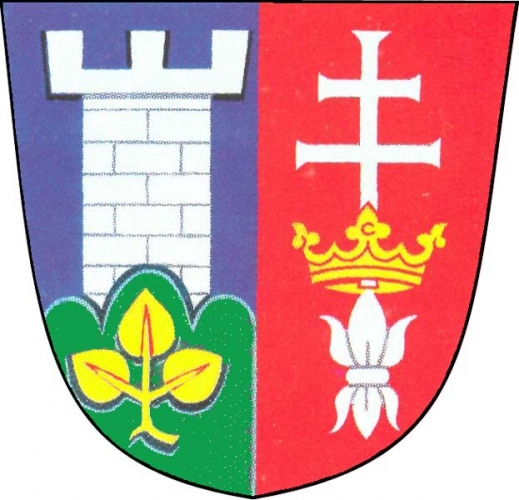
- Flag Coat of arms

- Location in the Czech Republic
- Coordinates: 49°32′35″N 16°55′49″E
- Country: Czech Republic
- Region: Olomouc
- District: Prostějov
- First mentioned: 1379

Area
  - Total: 3.55 km^{2} (1.37 sq mi)
- Elevation: 338 m (1,109 ft)

Population (2026-01-01)
  - Total: 453
  - Density: 128/km^{2} (330/sq mi)
- Time zone: UTC+1 (CET)
  - Summer (DST): UTC+2 (CEST)
- Postal code: 798 44
- Website: www.obecstrazisko.cz

Stražisko is a municipality and village in Prostějov District in the Olomouc Region of the Czech Republic. It has about 500 inhabitants.

== Administrative division ==
Stražisko consists of three municipal parts (in brackets population according to the 2021 census):

- Stražisko (157)
- Maleny (117)
- Růžov (143)

== Geography ==
Stražisko is located about 14 kilometres (9 mi) northwest of Prostějov and 23 km (14 mi) west of Olomouc. It lies on the border between the Drahany Highlands and Zábřeh Highlands. The highest point is at 464 m (1,522 ft) above sea level. The Romže River flows through the municipality.

== History ==
The first written mention of Stražisko is from 1379. The early history of the village was connected with the Grünberg Castle, located on a hill above the village. In the 16th century, the castle was abandoned and fell into disrepair. In 1722, the ruin was demolished and a church was built on the site.

== Demographics ==
Historical population

Year	Pop.	±%
1869	682	—
1880	697	+2.2%
1890	710	+1.9%
1900	673	−5.2%
1910	729	+8.3%

Year	Pop.	±%
1921	753	+3.3%
1930	756	+0.4%
1950	662	−12.4%
1961	664	+0.3%
1970	602	−9.3%

Year	Pop.	±%
1980	499	−17.1%
1991	416	−16.6%
2001	424	+1.9%
2011	414	−2.4%
2021	417	+0.7%

Source: Censuses

== Transport ==
Stražisko is located on the railway line Prostějov–Dzbel.

== Sights ==
The main landmark of Stražisko is the Church of the Guardian Angels, located on a hill inside the built-up area. It was built in the Baroque style in 1728. The path to the church is lined with fourteen Stations of the Cross, dating from 1854.

== Notable people ==
- Otto Wichterle (1913–1998), chemist and inventor; lived and died here
- Jan Hrbatý (1942–2019), ice hockey player
