= Hrbatý =

Hrbatý (feminine: Hrbatá) is a Czech and Slovak surname which may refer to:

- Dominik Hrbatý, Slovak tennis player
- Jan Hrbatý, Czech ice hockey player
