= Konice =

- Town
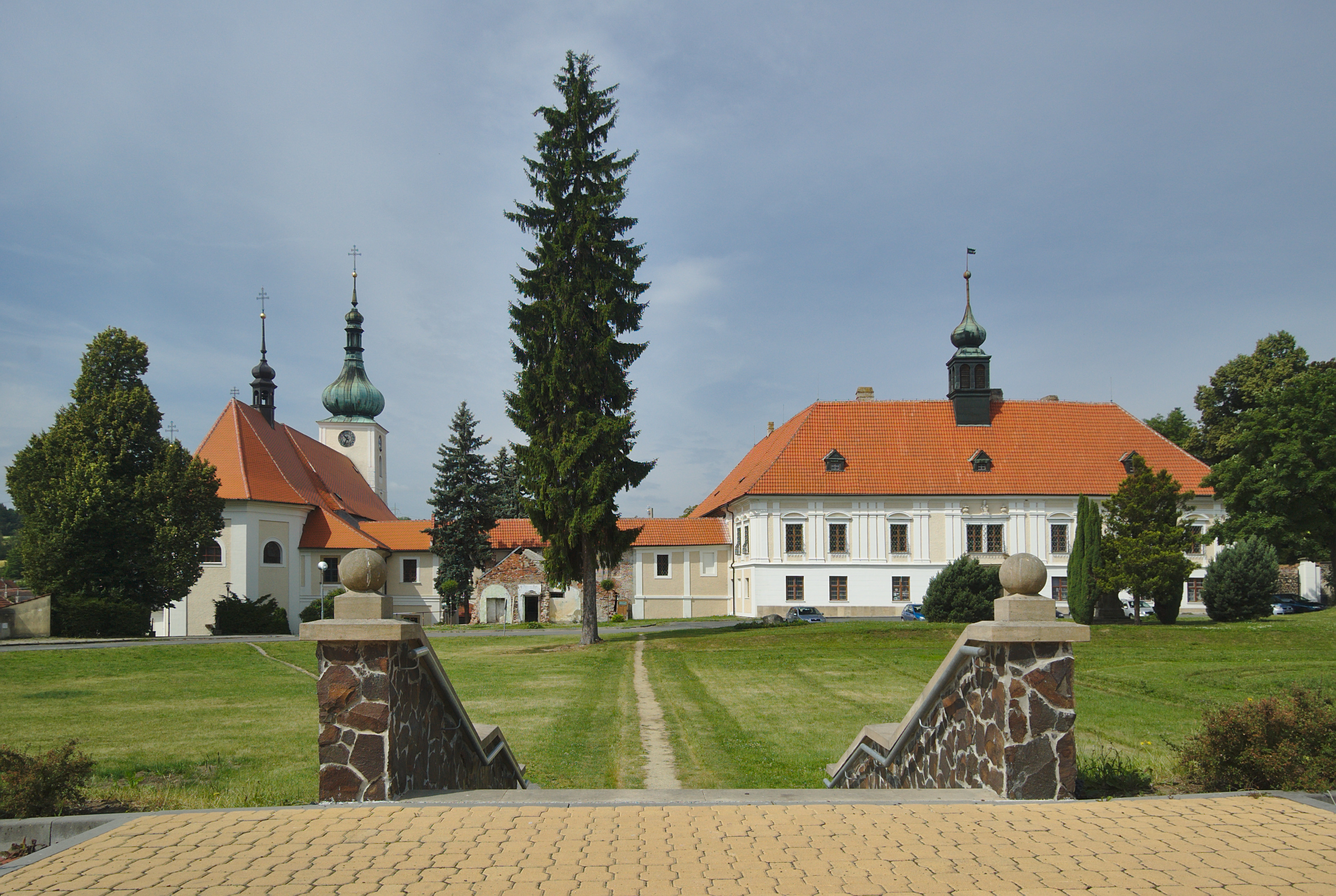
- Church of the Nativity of the Virgin Mary and Konice Castle

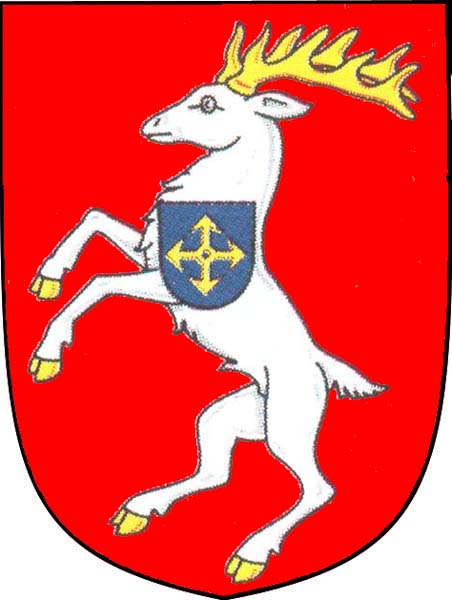
- Flag Coat of arms

- Location in the Czech Republic
- Coordinates: 49°35′25″N 16°53′21″E
- Country: Czech Republic
- Region: Olomouc
- District: Prostějov
- First mentioned: 1200

Government
  - Mayor: Michal Obrusník

Area
  - Total: 24.45 km^{2} (9.44 sq mi)
- Elevation: 423 m (1,388 ft)

Population (2026-01-01)
  - Total: 2,620
  - Density: 107/km^{2} (278/sq mi)
- Time zone: UTC+1 (CET)
  - Summer (DST): UTC+2 (CEST)
- Postal code: 798 52
- Website: www.konice.cz

Konice (Czech pronunciation: [ˈkoɲɪtsɛ]; German: Konitz) is a town in Prostějov District in the Olomouc Region of the Czech Republic. It has about 2,600 inhabitants.

== Administrative division ==
Konice consists of six municipal parts (in brackets population according to the 2021 census):

- Konice (1,980)
- Čunín (165)
- Křemenec (110)
- Ladín (90)
- Nová Dědina (145)
- Runářov (115)

Nová Dědina forms an exclave of the municipal territory.

== Geography ==
Konice is located about 20 kilometres (12 mi) northwest of Prostějov and 25 km (16 mi) west of Olomouc. It lies on the border between the Drahany Highlands and Zábřeh Highlands. The highest point is the hill Runářovský vrch at 602 m (1,975 ft) above sea level. The Romže River flows through the town.

== History ==
The first written mention of Konice is from 1200. It was probably the site of a fortress, which protected a trade route from Moravia to Bohemia. After the settlement was founded, the fortress became a manor house.

After Konice changed hands several times, it became a property of the Lords of Švábenice, who held it from 1434 to 1655. After several property disputes, it was bought by the Hradisko Monastery in 1699. The monastery was abolished in 1784 and its propertives were managed by the state. Konice was bought by the entrepreneur Karel Příza in 1825. He reconstructed the local castle and moved there in 1830. His family owned the estate until 1945.

In 1970, Konice was promoted to a town.

== Demographics ==
Historical population

Year	Pop.	±%
1869	4,392	—
1880	4,445	+1.2%
1890	4,393	−1.2%
1900	4,196	−4.5%
1910	4,153	−1.0%

Year	Pop.	±%
1921	4,059	−2.3%
1930	4,036	−0.6%
1950	3,050	−24.4%
1961	3,314	+8.7%
1970	3,068	−7.4%

Year	Pop.	±%
1980	3,183	+3.7%
1991	3,099	−2.6%
2001	3,031	−2.2%
2011	2,792	−7.9%
2021	2,605	−6.7%

Source: Censuses

== Economy ==
The largest employer is the textile company Moděva Konice. It was founded in 1931 and resides in Konice since 1949.

== Transport ==
Konice is located on the Prostějov–Dzbel railway line.

== Sights ==
The most important monument is the Konice Castle. This Baroque castle replaced the old fortress in 1705.

The Church of the Nativity of the Virgin Mary was first indirectly mentioned in 1371. It was rebuilt into its current form in 1699–1709. It houses a unique wooden pulpit.

== Notable people ==
- Bolesław Masłowski (1851–1928), Polish chemist; lived and worked here
- Jaroslav Krejčí (1892–1956), lawyer and Nazi collaborator
- Pavel Trávníček (born 1950), actor
- Jan Březina (born 1954), politician
- Miloslav Vlček (born 1961), politician
