= Kojetín =

- Town
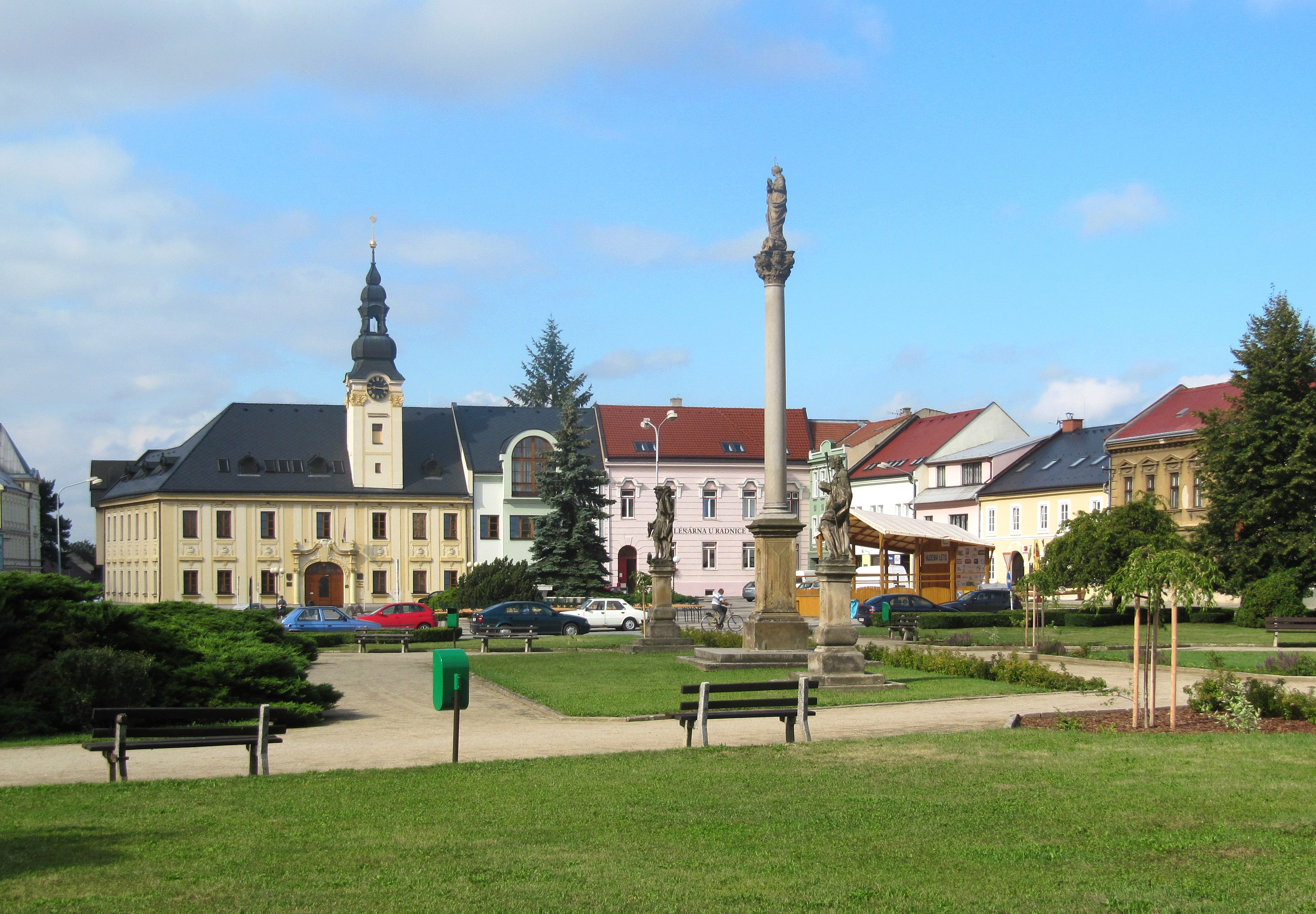
- Town square

- Flag Coat of arms

- Location in the Czech Republic
- Coordinates: 49°21′6″N 17°18′8″E
- Country: Czech Republic
- Region: Olomouc
- District: Přerov
- First mentioned: 1233

Government
  - Mayor: Leoš Ptáček

Area
  - Total: 31.09 km^{2} (12.00 sq mi)
- Elevation: 200 m (660 ft)

Population (2026-01-01)
  - Total: 5,721
  - Density: 184.0/km^{2} (476.6/sq mi)
- Time zone: UTC+1 (CET)
  - Summer (DST): UTC+2 (CEST)
- Postal code: 752 01
- Website: www.kojetin.cz

Kojetín (Czech pronunciation: [ˈkojɛciːn]; German: Kojetein) is a town in Přerov District in the Olomouc Region of the Czech Republic. It has about 5,700 inhabitants. The town proper is located on the Morava River in the Upper Morava Valley. The main landmark of Kojetín is the Church of the Assumption of the Virgin Mary.

== Administrative division ==
Kojetín consists of three municipal parts (in brackets population according to the 2021 census):

- Kojetín I-Město (5,378)
- Kojetín II-Popůvky (166)
- Kojetín III-Kovalovice (147)

== Geography ==
Kojetín is located about 8 kilometres (5 mi) northeast of Kroměříž and 15 km (9 mi) southwest of Přerov. It lies mostly in the Upper Morava Valley, only the southern part of the municipal territory is located in the Litenčice Hills. The town is located on the right bank of the Morava River. The Haná River flows south of the town.

== History ==
According to legends, origins of Kojetín can be traced to the times of Samo's Empire. The town is said to receive its name after Samo's legendary son Kojata, who founded a settlement named Kojata, later Kojetín. In fact, it was probably not founded until the 12th or 13th century. The first written mention of Kojetín is from 1233.

Until the Hussite Wars, Kojetín was owned by the Archdiocese of Prague. After the wars, it was acquired by Jiří of Sternberg. Until the 18th century, it was gradually owned by several aristocratic families. The town achieved the most significant development during the rule of the Pernštejn family. In 1720, it returned to the property of the Archdiocese of Prague.

== Demographics ==
Historical population

Year	Pop.	±%
1869	4,325	—
1880	5,414	+25.2%
1890	6,169	+13.9%
1900	6,627	+7.4%
1910	7,027	+6.0%

Year	Pop.	±%
1921	6,812	−3.1%
1930	6,913	+1.5%
1950	5,801	−16.1%
1961	6,074	+4.7%
1970	6,380	+5.0%

Year	Pop.	±%
1980	6,756	+5.9%
1991	6,529	−3.4%
2001	6,432	−1.5%
2011	6,170	−4.1%
2021	5,691	−7.8%

Source: Censuses

== Transport ==
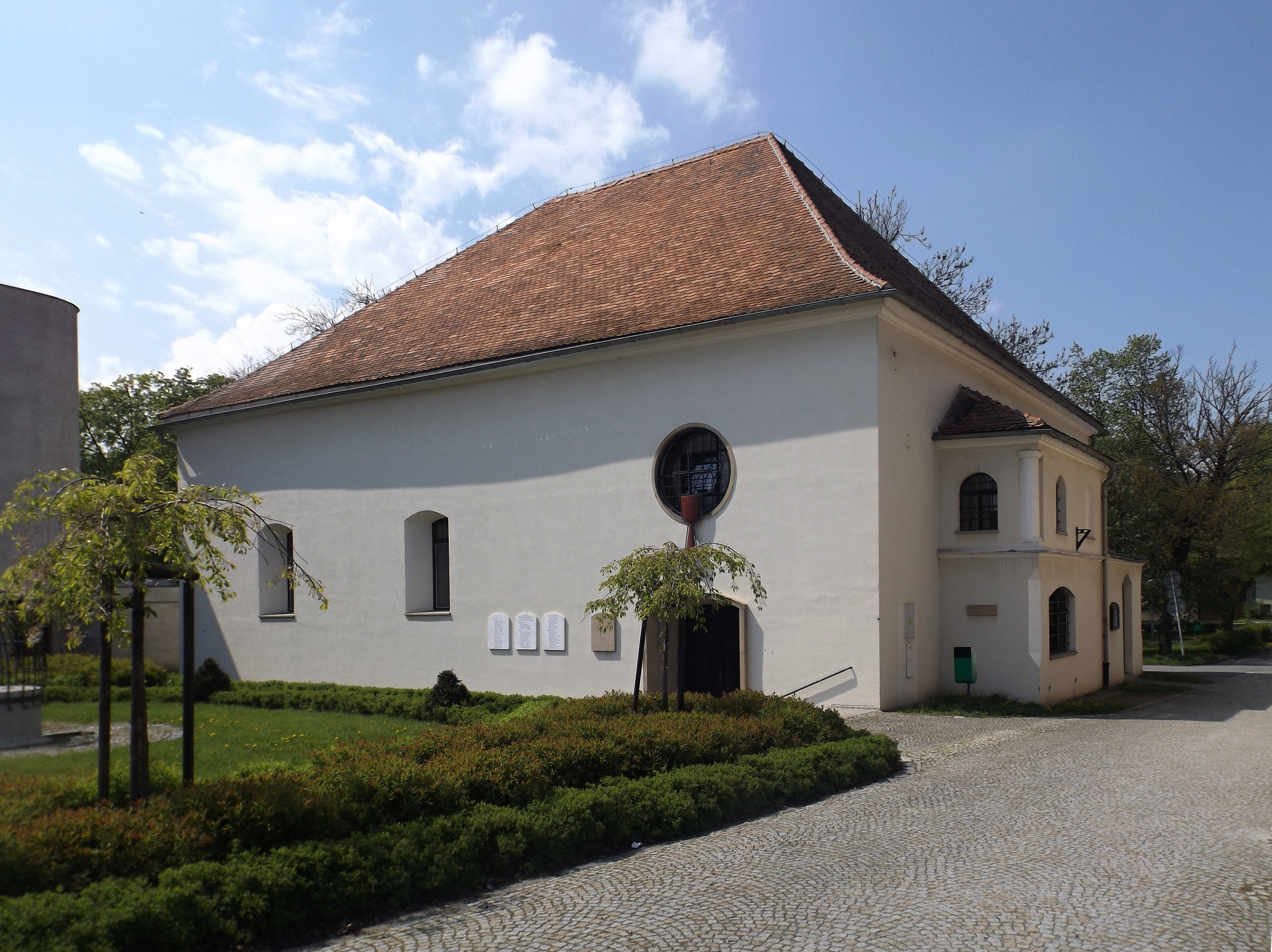
Former synagogue

The D1 motorway from Brno to Ostrava runs through the southern part of the municipal territory.

Kojetín is located on two important railway lines: Brno–Ostrava–Bohumín and Olomouc–Vyškov. A railway line of local importance also leads from Kojetín to Holešov.

== Culture ==
Kojetín lies in the ethnographic region of Haná.

== Sights ==
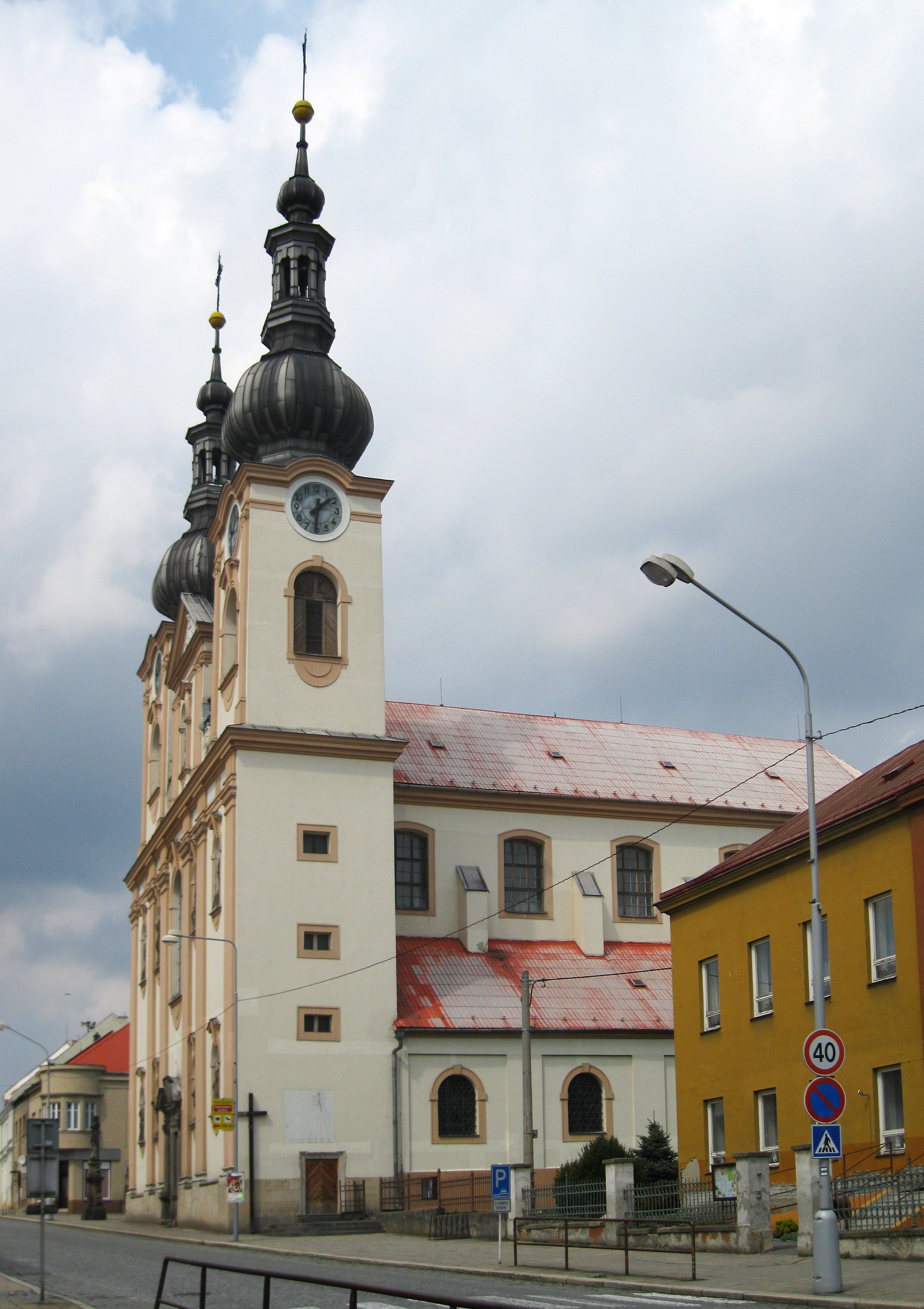
Church of the Assumption of the Virgin Mary

The most important monument and the main landmark of the town is the Church of the Assumption of the Virgin Mary. This Baroque church from the end of the 17th century was built on a Gothic ground plan.

The former synagogue in Kojetín is one of the oldest synagogues in Moravia. The building currently serves as a prayer house for the Czechoslovak Hussite Church. There is also a Jewish cemetery, first documented after 1550.

== Notable people ==
- Jan Tomáš Kuzník (1716–1786), composer and poet; died here
- Beda Dudík (1815–1890), historian
- David Kaufmann (1852–1899), Jewish scholar
- Eduard Hedvicek (1878–1947), Austrian historic personality
- Libor Žůrek (born 1979), footballer
