= Jan Březina =

Czech politician

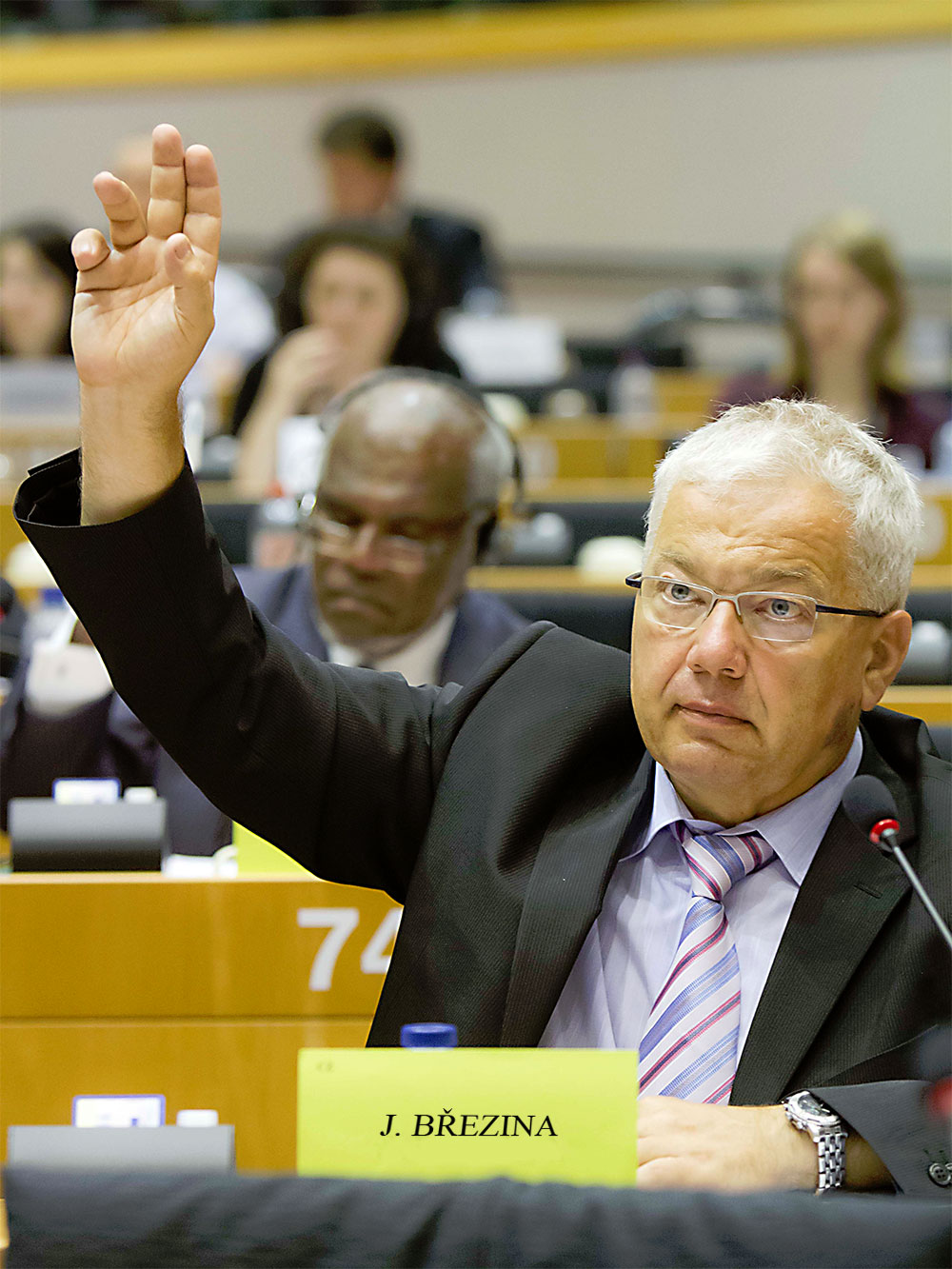

Member of the European Parliament for Czech Republic
- In office 20 July 2004 – 30 June 2014

Personal details
- Born: 14 April 1954 (age 72) Konice, Czechoslovakia
- Party: KDU-ČSL (1990–2012)
- Education: VSB – Technical University of Ostrava

Jan Březina (born 14 April 1954) is a Czech politician and Member of the European Parliament with KDU-ČSL, part of the European People's Party and sits on the European Parliament's Committee on Industry, Research and Energy. He was elected for Christian Democratic Union - Czechoslovak People's Party, but left the party in February 2012.

He is a substitute for the Committee on Regional Development and a member of the Delegation for relations with the countries of south-east Europe.

== Education ==
- 1978: Master's degree in mining (VŠB Technical University of Ostrava)

== Career ==
- since 1990: Member of KDU-ČSL (Christian Democratic Union - Czechoslovak People's Party)
- since 1995: Member of a district committee of KDU-ČSL
- since 2000: Member of the board of KDU-ČSL
- since 2000: Member of the KDU-ČSL national conference
- since 2000: Member of the KDU-ČSL national committee
- 1995-1997: Deputy Mayor of Uničov
- 1997-2000: Chief Executive of Olomouc District Office
- 2000-2004: Member of the Regional Assembly of the Olomouc Region and President of the Olomouc Region
- 2000-2004: Joint Committee with the EU Committee of the Regions
- 2004: Member of the Committee of the Regions
- since 1998: Participated in the drafting of the Czech Republic's strategy papers

== See also ==
- 2004 European Parliament election in the Czech Republic
