= Eduard Hedvicek =

Austrian politician (1878 - 1949)

Eduard Hedvicek (Czech: Eduard Hedvíček; 17 March 1878 in Kojetín – 12 September 1949 in Vienna) was the secretary of Engelbert Dollfuß, the Austrian Chancellor before the Anschluss. On 25 July 1934 he unsuccessfully tried to prevent Dollfuß's assassination by Otto Planetta. He testified at the trial of the murderers as a "Crown" (prosecution) witness and was awarded the Gold Medal of Merit Signum Laudis by the Austrian government for his heroic efforts. He was imprisoned by the Nazis after Germany annexed Austria. His imprisonment was a matter of personal revenge for Ernst Kaltenbrunner, the SS-Obergruppenführer and Chef der Reichssicherheitshauptamtes of the Nazi government and a famous Austrian Nazi, who himself was involved in Dollfuß's assassination and was for this and other crimes hanged after the war.

== Publications ==
- Assassination in Vienna, Walter B. Maass, published by Charles Scribners's Sons, New York
- The Order of the Death's Head: The Story of Hitler's SS, by Heinz Zollin Höhne and Richard Barry
- Dollfuss, Gordon Brook-Shepherd, published by Macmillan&Co Ltd, London, 1961
- První zemřel kancléř, Vladimír Bauman and Miroslav Hladký, Praha, 1968
- Na dně byla smrt, Otakar Brožek and Jiří Horský, Praha, 1968
