= Jan Nehera =

Czech businessman

- Born: 31 December 1899; Kostelec na Hané, Moravia, Austria-Hungary
- Died: 4 April 1958 (aged 58); Casablanca, Morocco

Jan Nehera (31 December 1899 – 4 April 1958) was a Czech businessman. With his pioneering approach to retail trade and advanced manufacturing methods he was able to make his way on three continents where, from 1931 to 1939, he was progressively developing a network of more than 130 retail shops of large capacity and several tens of business representations and plants. He was the first to vertically integrate the sale of ready-made clothing from the manufacturing process to retail, and thus he showed the way to current luxury houses such as Chanel and Hermes. He implemented many innovative approaches into practice which were also used by Ford or Bata. His products were at the top of the textile tradition in the Czechoslovak Republic which had begun in 1858 with the first plant for ready-made clothing in Europe built in Prostějov near Nehera's hometown. This tradition is still alive in many garment factories in Prostějov and Trenčín.

== Business beginnings ==
After Nehera had finished his formation to become a locksmith and completed his basic military training, in 1923, with the help of his father and two partners he established his first factory carrying the name Nehera a spol. After several years, both the father and son left the factory in order to establish their own family business. They were producing men's and children's ready-made clothes which they supplied to traders. In its beginnings, the business located in Prostějov had 9 permanent employees and 50 tailors working at home.

== Change of the business model ==
Around 1929, Nehera started contemplating the sale of ready-made clothes in his own stores. He was inspired by Bata's style of doing business and also borrowed his idea of prices ending in nines. The opening of his first independent store in Prague at Wenceslas Square in 1931 was accompanied by an extensive advertising campaign with the slogan "directly from the manufacturer to the consumer". The campaign reached people so well that, according to the archives, the turnover in the first stores climbed to 100,000 Czechoslovak korunas a day. The opening of own stores gave him the opportunity for selling directly to customers. Nehera was one of the few businessmen who managed not only to flourish at the beginning of the 1930s during the economic crisis, but he even extended the scope of his services. This was so mainly thanks to the full vertical integration of the whole logistic chain, from the production of ready-made clothes to their retail selling, in own factories and own stores.

== Progressive approach to business ==
The difference between Nehera and his competition that had a substantially longer tradition was in particular that, unlike Nehera, they were not able to catch a new business trend early or their production was too narrowly specialised. Only a few people paid very much attention to promotion like Nehera. Alongside a massive campaign, frequent discounts and sales or Bata prices ending in nine, he also published a company magazine in order to motivate his employees. Moreover, Nehera did not resist extending his services. In addition to selling women's, men's, and children's ready-made clothes, the company also started to offer the tailoring of clothes of its customers as well as the services of public ironing in stores. In larger towns, mobile ironing stations were deployed, parking e.g. in front of football stadiums. Approximately in the first half of the 1930s, Nehera began providing tailored clothing with a 10% surcharge on the standard price.

== A period of prosperity ==
In the course of three years, the domestic distribution network extended enormously and therefore, it was necessary to deal with the rationalisation of the production itself. Nehera went on a study trip to the United States where he absorbed Henry Ford's know-how. In 1935, Nehera was already employing 1,000 people and the number of stores increased to 76. In the second half of the 1930s, when the domestic sales network saw its most productive times, the company's sales reached nearly 20,000,000 Czechoslovak korunas a month. The increased number of employees resulted in the lack of qualified workforce and, therefore, in 1937 Nehera established a boarding school for adolescents.

== Expanding abroad ==
From 1936, alongside domestic stores, foreign affiliated branches were gradually coming into existence, e.g. in Stockholm, Sweden, Oslo, Norway, and in Africa. Stores in northern Europe were managed by local inhabitants, while Czechoslovak employees were sent to Africa. In 1940, Nehera established a new factory in Trenčín which later changed to Ozeta. Nehera's company also exported its goods to cities with no direct representation. His clothes set fashion trends in such European cities as Moscow, Zurich, Vienna, Paris, and Amsterdam.

== Public contracts ==
Apart from his own sales network, Nehera also tried to obtain public contracts with important institutions. The business was successful in this field as well, as it was awarded a relatively extensive contract for the supply of clothes for the Czechoslovak Army.

== Emigration to Casablanca ==
After World War II, Nehera faced many problems with the Nazis to whom he lost his factory, he was arrested and imprisoned. After the war, in 1945, his company was nationalized and became a part of the state-owned company OP Prostějov. Therefore, Nehera decided to emigrate to Casablanca, Morocco, where he managed to establish a smaller garment factory before his death due to kidney disease in 1958.
