= Bolesław Masłowski =

Polish chemist

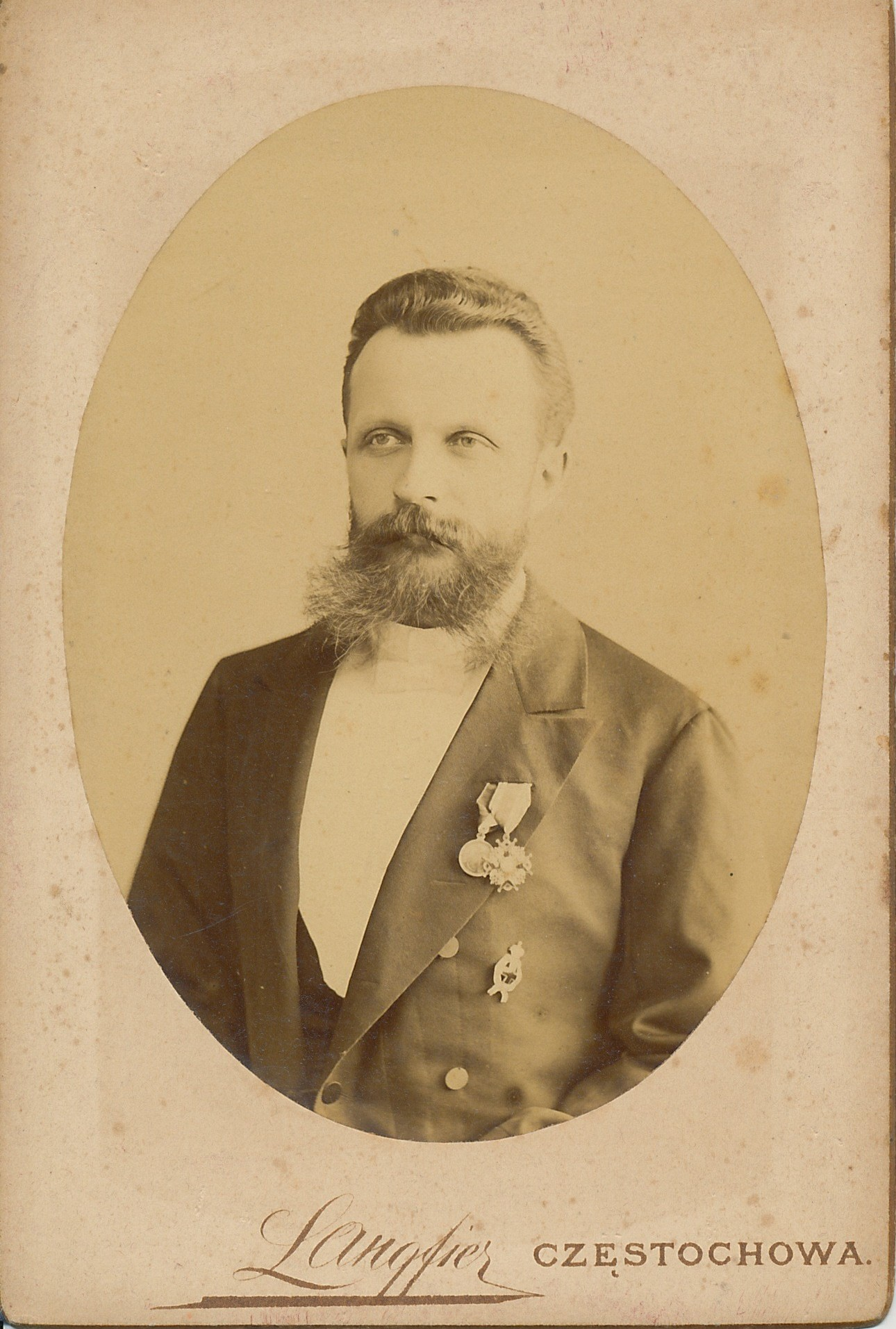
- Born: 1851; Włodawa,
- Died: 20 June 1928 (aged 76–77); Konice, Czechoslovakia
- Education: Heidelberg University
- Occupations: Inventor, engineer
- Known for: Inventions in pigment chemistry and dyeing techniques in the textile industry
- Spouse: Felicja Masłowski
- Parent(s): Rajmund Masłowski (1825–1897), Waleria Józefa Danilewicz (1828–1881)

Bolesław Masłowski (1851 – 20 June 1928) was a Polish chemist. He contributed to the dyeing industry.

== Biography ==
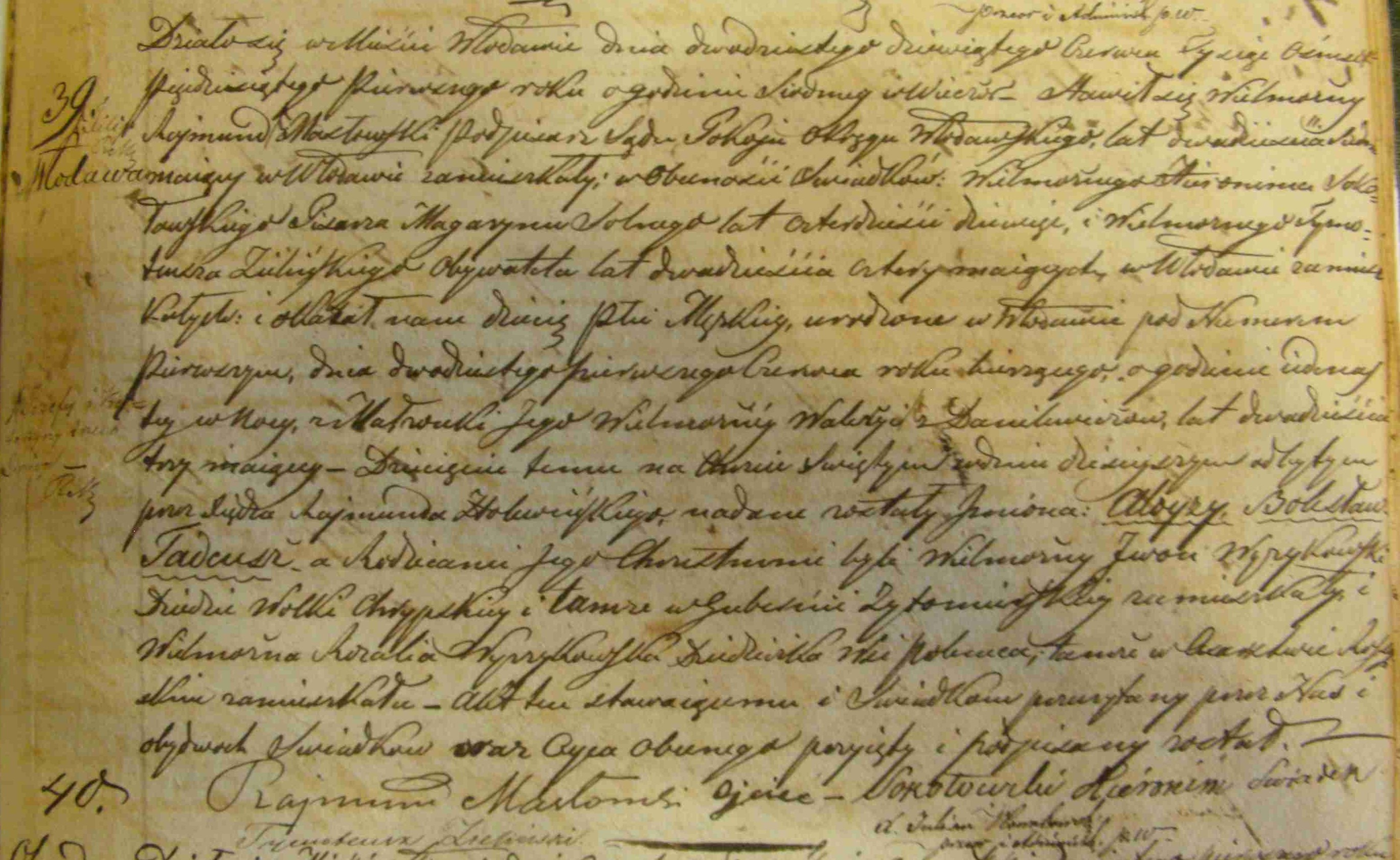
Bolesław Masłowski birth certificate, Włodawa, 1851

=== Family ===
Bolesław Masłowski was born in 1851 in Włodawa, Poland to Rajmund Masłowski (1825–1897), a lawyer, and Waleria Józefa of Danilewicz (1827–1881). His baptism certificate is stored in the parish archives of St. Louis of Pauline Fathers in Włodawa.

Born into an impoverished noble family, he had a few notable relatives, including his brother and his maternal grandfather. His brother Stanisław Masłowski was a Polish painter who lived from 1853 to 1926. His grandfather, Wincenty Danilewicz (Ostoja coat of arms, born in 1787 in Mińsk Lit, a former Polish–Lithuanian Commonwealth territory), was enlisted as a light-cavalryman for active duty in the Napoleonic campaign, for which he was awarded the French Order of Legion of Honour.

His family originally came from Wieluń, Poland. They used the nickname "Watta of Ruda" (Polish: "Z Rudy"). (Ruda was the first capital of Wieluń County.)

=== Early years ===
In 1856, Masłowski and his family moved from Włodawa to Garwolin, and then to Chęciny shortly thereafter in 1858.

According to records, in 1864 he was arrested and dispatched on unknown charges, then sentenced approximately six months at Kielce prison.

In 1865, the Masłowski family established residence in Kalisz.

=== Education ===
After graduating from a local high school in Kalisz, Masłowski began a two-year study of pharmacy in Warsaw, where his parents had relocated in 1871.

It is unknown what became of his academic efforts in Warsaw. He continued his studies at Heidelberg University. There, he frequently attended the lectures of Professor Robert Bunsen.

Masłowski's studies were interrupted in 1877 by the outbreak of the Russo-Turkish War (1877–1878). A subject to the Russian Empire, Masłowski was drafted into the Imperial Russian Army and put into the sanitary service. Fortunately, he was able to continue his education after the war ended. Once he left the army, he picked up his studies at Mulhouse, Alsace. During his time there, he learnt from the great Professor E. Noelting. Masłowski graduated in 1881 with a degree in dye (pigment) chemistry, as a specialization.

=== Career ===
Masłowski's career began when he took a job as a laborer in a dye Joint-Stock Company "Zawiercie" (Silesia). During the two initial months of internship, he received high praise from superiors for his achievements. As a result, he quickly became a collaborator of E. Lauter, who was an outstanding specialist in the field of dyeing techniques.

Within three months, he was hired as manager of calico printing. Three years later, he was promoted to company manager, with 6000 employees under his supervision. Masłowski held this position until 1891 after which he moved to Germany. There, five years later, he published in Farber Zeitung an article on alkaline methods of removing Turkish red dye.

In 1904, Masłowski began working at a textile plant in Konice on Moravia (then in Austria-Hungary, from 1918 Czechoslovakia). He remained there as a managing director until his death on 20 June 1928 in Konice, leaving his children with his wife Felice.

== Bibliography ==
- Robert Bielecki: (in Polish) Szwoleżerowie gwardii -(1st Polish Light Cavalry Regiment of the Imperial Guard), seria: "Słynne Pułki Polskie" (["Famous Polish Regiments" – series]), ed. "Neriton", Warsaw 1996, pp. 240 (entry 2259);
- Registry books in Parish of St. Louis of Pauline Fathers in Włodawa;
- Zygmunt Gloger (in Polish): Geografia historyczna ziem dawnej Polski (Historic Geography of Ancient Polish Lands): https://web.archive.org/web/20180522220501/http://literat.ug.edu.pl/glogre/0019.htm
- Stanislaw Łoza: (in Polish) Legia honorowa w Polsce 1803–1923 (Legion of Honour in Poland 1803–1923), Zamość 1923, ed. Zygmunt Pomarański and Company (reprinted Warsaw 1986, ed. WAiF), pp. 38, poz.284;
- Maciej Maslowski: (in Polish) Stanisław Masłowski – Materiały do życiorysu i twórczości (Stanisław Masłowski – Resources for study of life and work), ed. National Ossoliński Institute), Wrocław 1957, pp. 238, 247;
- (in Polish) Polski Słownik Biograficzny (Polish Biographical Dictionary), Wrocław-Kraków-Warsaw-Gdańsk, 1975 (ed. Polish Academy of Sciences – National Ossoliński Institute), vol .XX/1 pp. 124 – entry: "Masłowski Bolesław" by Kazimierz Sarnecki;
- (in Polish) "Przemysł Chemiczny" ("Chemical Industry" Journal), 1928, pp. 428, 1929, p. 30,
- Raczkowski K. K: (in Polish) Ze wspomnień chemika-kolorysty (Fragments of Memories of The Dye Chemist), "Przemysł Chemiczny" ("Chemical Industry" Journal), 1947, p. 474;
- Trepka E.: (in Polish) Osiągnięcia polskich kolorystów (Achievements of Polish Dye Chemists), "Przemysł Włókienniczy" ("Textile Industry" journal) Vol.3, 1949, p. 190.
- Trepka E.: (in Polish) Historia kolorystyki (The History of Dyeing Industry Warsaw 1960, pp. 368, 410, 438;
- Stanisław Masłowski family archives.
