= Kraličky (Kralice na Hané) =

- Village
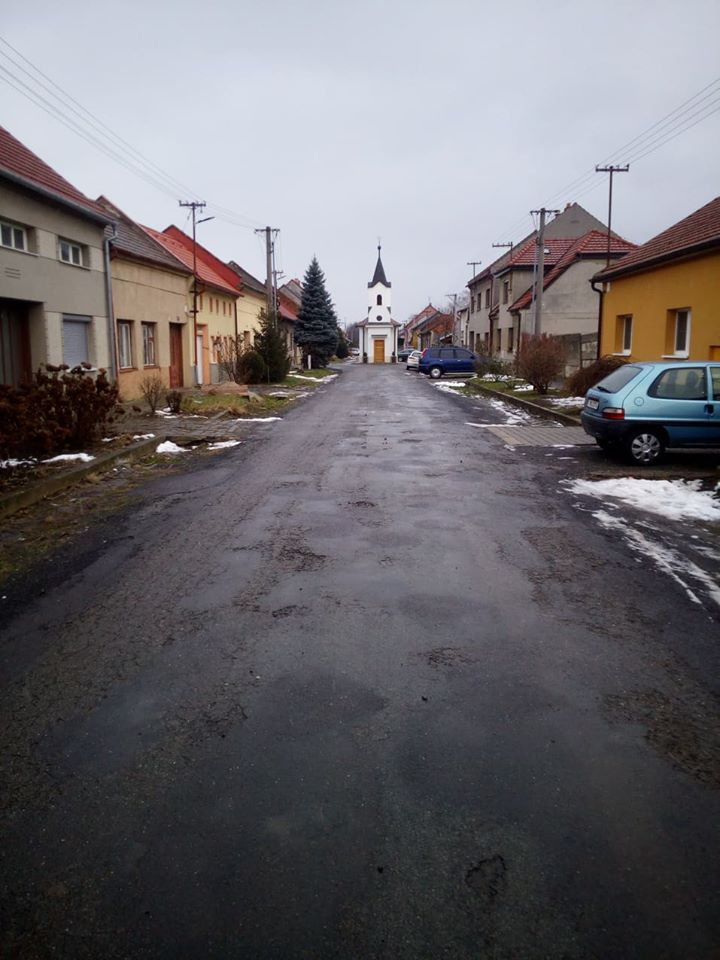
- Main street

- Location in the Czech Republic
- Coordinates: 49°28′5″N 17°11′1″E
- Country: Czech Republic
- Region: Olomouc
- District: Prostějov
- Municipality: Kralice na Hané
- Founded: 1791

Area
  - Total: 2.05 km^{2} (0.79 sq mi)
- Elevation: 355 m (1,165 ft)

Population (2021)
  - Total: 93
  - Density: 45/km^{2} (120/sq mi)
- Time zone: UTC+1 (CET)
  - Summer (DST): UTC+2 (CEST)
- Postal code: 798 12

Kraličky (until 1950 Sajlerov; German: Seilerndorf) is a village and municipal part of Kralice na Hané in Prostějov District in the Olomouc Region of the Czech Republic. It has about 90 inhabitants.

== Geography ==
Kraličky is located in the northern part of the municipal territory of Kralice na Hané, about 4 kilometres (2 mi) east of Prostějov and 12 km (7 mi) south of Olomouc. It lies in a flat agricultural landscape in the Upper Morava Valley, in the Haná region.

== History ==
Kraličky was established in 1791 by the Seilern family, who owned the Kralice estate.

== Demographics ==
Historical population

Year	Pop.	±%
1869	133	—
1880	160	+20.3%
1890	124	−22.5%
1900	121	−2.4%
1910	130	+7.4%

Year	Pop.	±%
1921	131	+0.8%
1930	124	−5.3%
1950	111	−10.5%
1961	109	−1.8%
1970	110	+0.9%

Year	Pop.	±%
1980	100	−9.1%
1991	82	−18.0%
2001	89	+8.5%
2011	90	+1.1%
2021	93	+3.3%

Source: Censuses

== Transport ==
The train station called Kraličky, which serves the village, is located on the railway line Nezamyslice–Kouty nad Desnou via Olomouc. However, the station is situated just outside the territory of Kraličky.

== Sights ==
The main landmark is the Chapel of Saint John of Nepomuk, which was built in 1881. There are no protected cultural monuments in the territory of Kraličky.
