= Petr Bezruč =

Czech poet and short story writer

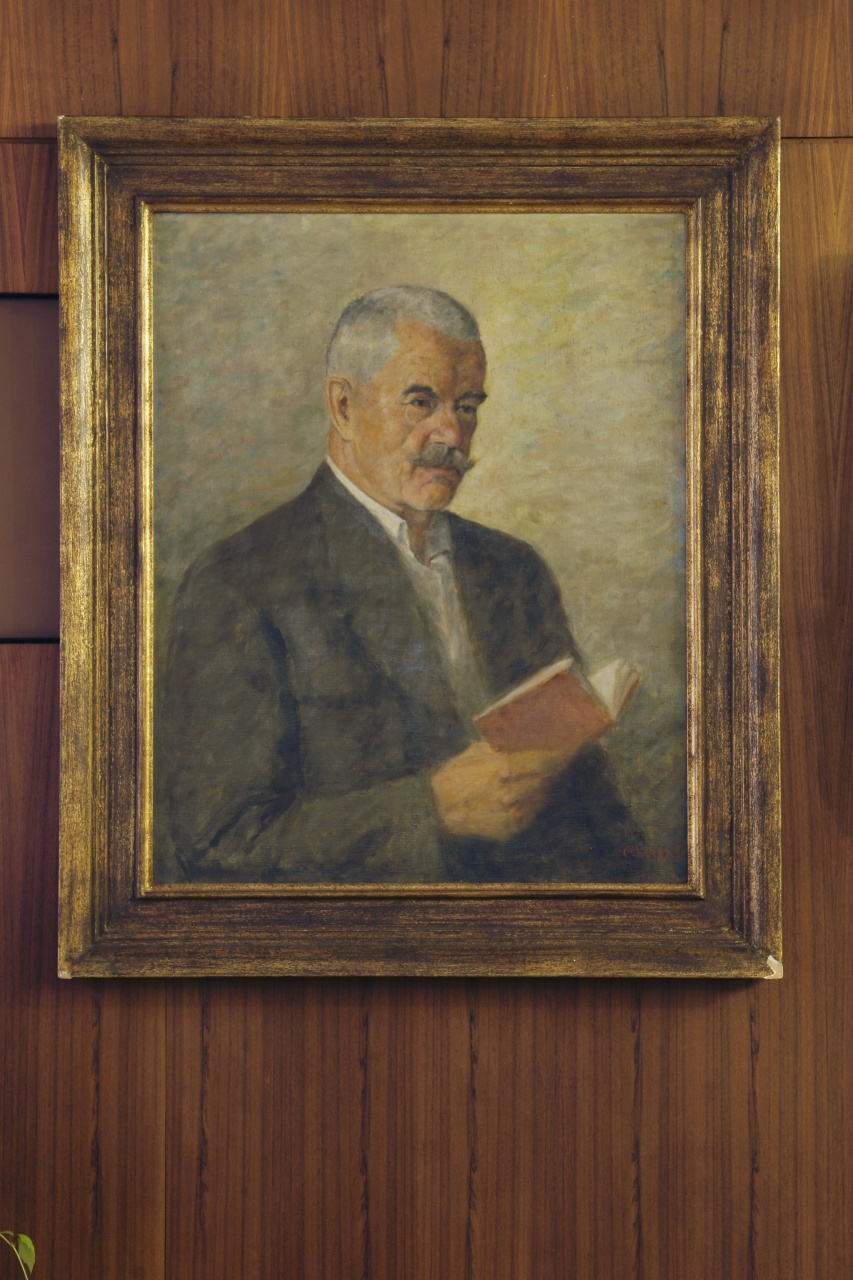
- Born: Vladimír Vašek; 15 September 1867; Opava, Austrian Silesia
- Died: 17 February 1958 (aged 90); Olomouc, Czechoslovakia
- Citizenship: Austrian, Czechoslovak
- Occupation: Writer
- Writing career
- Pen name: Petr Bezruč
- Notable work: Silesian Songs

Petr Bezruč (Czech pronunciation: [ˈpɛtr̩ ˈbɛzrutʃ]) was the pseudonym of Vladimír Vašek ([ˈvlaɟɪmiːr ˈvaʃɛk]; 15 September 1867 – 17 February 1958), a Czech poet and short story writer who was associated with the region of Austrian Silesia.

His most notable work is Silesian Songs, a collection of poems about the inhabitants of Silesia, written over many years.

== Life ==
Petr Bezruč was born Vladimír Vašek in Opava in 1867 to Antonín Vašek and Marie Vašková (née Brožková). Antonín was a teacher and public intellectual who published the first Czech-language newspaper in Silesia, Opavský Besedník.

Bezruč had five siblings; three brothers, Ladislav, Otakar, and Antonín; and two sisters, Olga and Helena.

In 1873, his family was forced to move to Brno due to his father's pro-Czech activities. Bezruč grew up in Brno, but spent the summers in the town of Háj ve Slezsku, where his father Antonín would hunt. In 1880, Antonín died of tuberculosis.

In 1881, Petr Bezruč began studying at the Slovanské Gymnázium in Brno (today's Gymnázium Kapitána Jaroše). From 1885 to 1888, Bezruč studied classical philology at Charles University in Prague, but he never completed his studies. During his time in Prague, Bezruč became more and more melancholic and introverted. He did, however, meet several authors who would be influential in his later life, including Jan and Vilém Mrštík, and learned from professors including T. G. Masaryk and Otakar Hostinský.

In 1888, Bezruč moved back to Brno, because his family was in a tough financial situation. He published his first work, the short story Studie z Café Lustig, under the pseudonym Ratibor Suk in the magazine Švanda Dudák. In 1891, after completing trade school to work as a postal officer, he was sent to the small town of Místek.

Bezruč's time in Místek from 1891 to 1893 was crucial for Silesian Songs. Much of the material for the poetry came from Bezruč's experiences there. In particular, he was deeply struck by the extreme poverty of the region and the resilience of the local people.

In 1893, Petr Bezruč's best friend, Ondřej Boleslav Petr, committed suicide, and Bezruč requested to be transferred back to Brno. In 1894, Bezruč's mother died and he began to take care of his younger brother Antonín, as well as to visit his brother Ladislav in Kostelec na Hané, which marked the beginning of his deep connection towards the Haná region.

In 1899, he sent poetry to the magazine Čas, using the pseudonym Petr Bezruč for the first time. Editor Jan Herben immediately recognized the quality of the poetry, and wanted to publish three poems, but because of Austrian censorship was only able to publish one. Over the next few years, Bezruč had his poetry published regularly in Čas. His first collection of poems was published in book form in 1903. In 1909, his poems were published with the collection title Silesian Songs for the first time.

In 1915, Bezruč was accused of writing two pro-Russian poems which appeared in the French magazine L’Indépendance Tchéque, which were signed P.B., but actually written by Jan Grmela. Bezruč was arrested under charges of treason, which was punishable by death. The military court found him innocent after failing to find evidence he had written the poems, but nevertheless moved him to a jail in Brno. With his literary success rising, including a translation of Silesian Songs to German, he was released later in 1916, although lawsuits continued until October 1918.

In the last forty years of his life, Silesian Songs was printed more and more frequently, and Bezruč was considered a Czech national poet. At the same time, however, he became more and more introverted and isolated from society. He enjoyed hiking in the Beskydy mountains.

Bezruč never published a work of the same acclaim as Silesian Songs. In 1945, he was awarded the title of národní umělec (national artist) by the Czechoslovak government.

From 1939 until his death, he lived in Kostelec na Hané. He died in the Olomouc hospital in 1958 at the age of 90. He was buried in Opava.

== Works ==
Bezruč's fame is almost entirely due to the poetry collection Silesian Songs, which generally portrays the people of Silesia as an oppressed group, suffering from foreign exploitation and the negative effects of industrialization. The poems are intended for a working class audience. The themes of the poems could resonate with any colonized group of people, or people feeling left behind by modernization. Specific poems in the collection deal with themes such as love, poverty, oppression at the hands of other ethnicities, and poems about specific towns or locations.

== Dispute over the authorship of Silesian Songs ==
Due to the fact that Petr Bezruč never wrote a similarly well-acclaimed collection of poems in his long life, as well as due to several details in the poems themselves, some critics have argued that Silesian Songs may in fact have multiple authors. Author and literary historian Jan Drozd argued that Vladimír Vašek co-wrote Silesian Songs with his friend Ondřej Boleslav Petr, and that Petr Bezruč is their collective pseudonym. Folklorist and rock musician Jaromír Nohavica argues that Ondřej Boleslav Petr is the author of around 10 of the poems in the Silesian Songs collection.

In 2014, the Czech Literature Bureau of the Czech Academy of Sciences published a new edition of Silesian Songs and criticized the hypothesis that anyone other than Vladimír Vašek wrote any of the poems in the collection.

== His birthplace ==
During his lifetime his fame was such that his birthplace became a heritage site. Today this building is managed by the Silesian Museum in Opava. The museum actually contains the documents belonging to 85 important people of literature. This makes the building and its contents to be of national importance. Actually the building is not the birthplace as the actual building was destroyed during World War Two. This building was built on the site of his birth after a campaign starting in 1946 and finishing in 1956. In 1958 it was decided that this museum should be managed by Opava's Silesian museum. The museum also owns the copyright to his works in line with his instructions.

== Bibliography ==
Poetry

- Slezské písně (Silesian Songs) (1899–1900) - one of the fundamental books of Czech poetry
- Stužkonoska modrá (The Blue Underwing) (1930)
- Přátelům a nepřátelům (To My Friends and Enemies) (1958)

Prose

- Povídky ze života (Tales of Life) (1957) - short stories

== Honours ==
The asteroid 3096 Bezruč was named in honour of Petr Bezruč.

== See also ==
- List of Czech writers
