= Jan Tomáš Kuzník =

Czech teacher of music, musician, composer and poet

Jan Tomáš Kuzník (1716 – 13 April 1786) was a Czech teacher of music, musician, composer and poet. He was active in the Haná region.

== Life ==
Kuzník was born in 1716 in Uhřičice near Přerov, Moravia. In 1739–1764, he worked in Napajedla as a music teacher and organist. Most of his works comes from this period. He composed church and lay music whose texts concentrate on misery of peasantry and Prussian Wars (he wrote the texts himself). Some of his easier works, composed in Haydn style, are played until today.

His son, Jan Karel Kuzník, was a collector of traditional folk songs and author of humoristic "map of Haná".

He died on 13 April 1786 in Kojetín.
