= Kralice na Hané =

- Market town
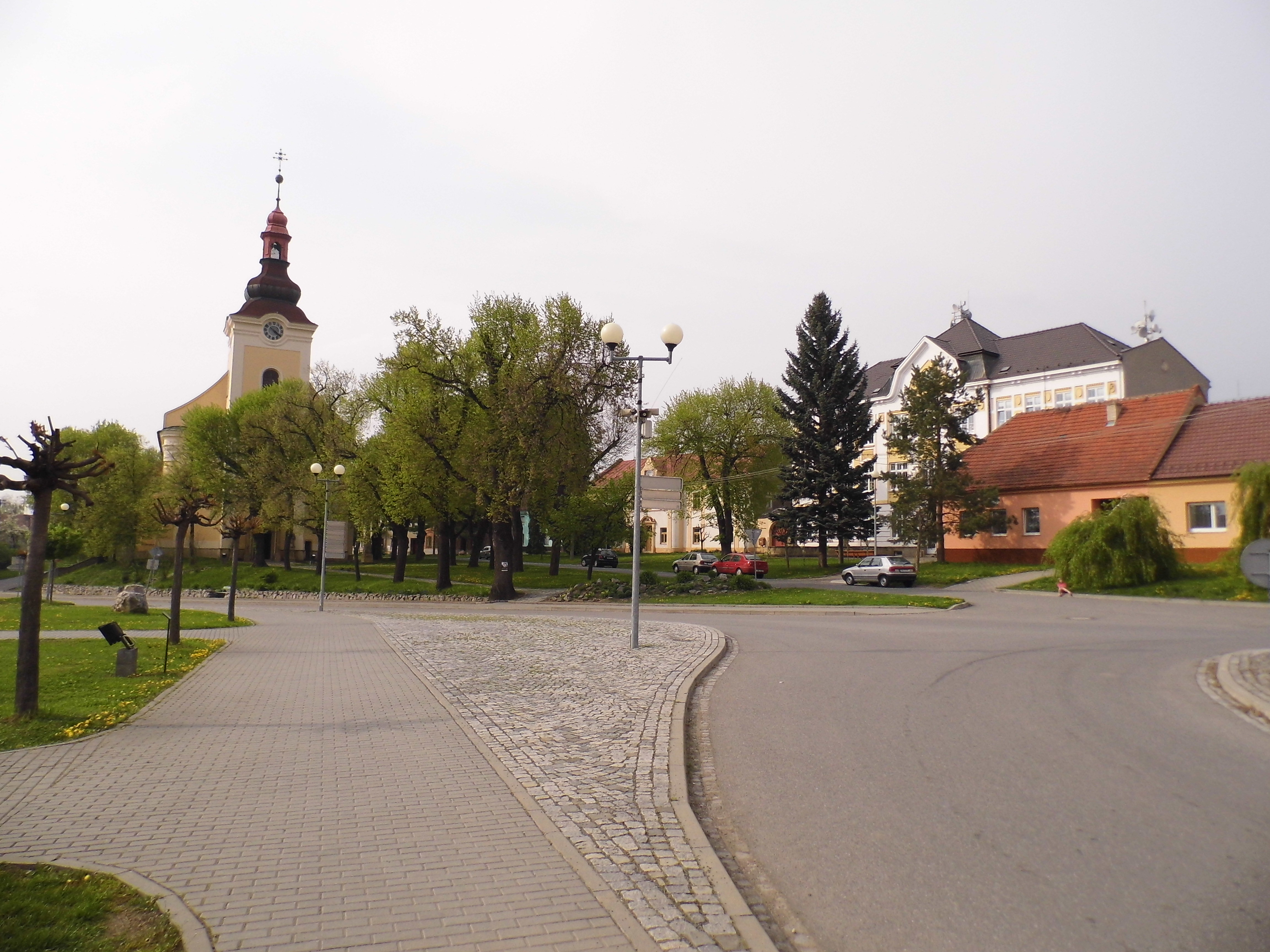
- Centre of Kralice na Hané

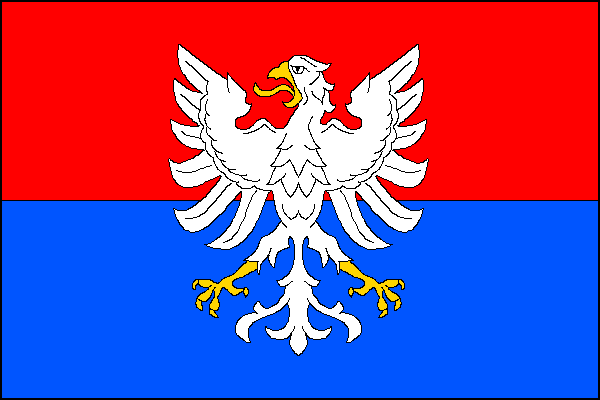
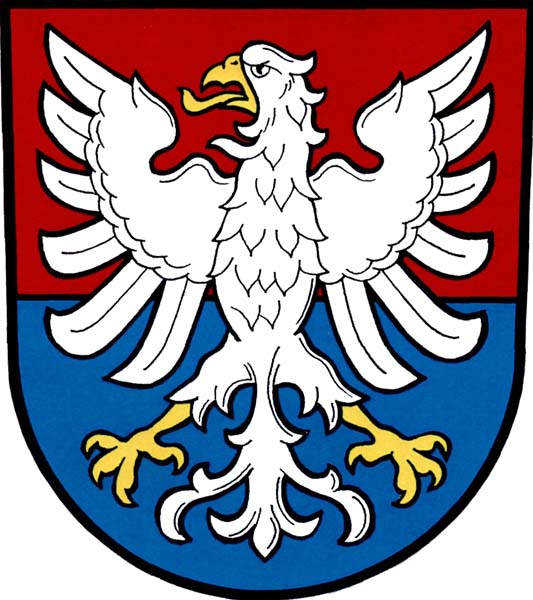
- Flag Coat of arms

- Location in the Czech Republic
- Coordinates: 49°27′47″N 17°10′50″E
- Country: Czech Republic
- Region: Olomouc
- District: Prostějov
- First mentioned: 1225

Area
  - Total: 12.67 km^{2} (4.89 sq mi)
- Elevation: 214 m (702 ft)

Population (2026-01-01)
  - Total: 1,707
  - Density: 134.7/km^{2} (348.9/sq mi)
- Time zone: UTC+1 (CET)
  - Summer (DST): UTC+2 (CEST)
- Postal code: 798 12
- Website: www.kralicenahane.cz

Kralice na Hané (Czech pronunciation: [ˈkralɪtsɛ ˈna ɦanɛː]) is a market town in Prostějov District in the Olomouc Region of the Czech Republic. It has about 1,700 inhabitants.

== Administrative division ==
Kralice na Hané consists of two municipal parts (in brackets population according to the 2021 census):

- Kralice na Hané (1,564)
- Kraličky (93)

== Geography ==
Kralice na Hané is located about 4 kilometres (2 mi) east of Prostějov and 14 km (9 mi) south of Olomouc. It lies in a flat agricultural landscape in the Upper Morava Valley, in the Haná region. The Romže River (here known as Valová) flows through the western part of the municipal territory.

== History ==
The first written mention of Kralice is from 1225. In 1304, it was already a market town. In the first half of the 15th century, it was owned by the Lords of Boskovice, then it was ruled by the Lords of Cimburk. For most of the 16th century, Kralice was a property of the Pernštejn family. In 1637, the estate was bought by the Counts of Salm-Neuburg. In 1707–1725, it was owned by Count Jan Josef of Rottal. In 1725, the market town was acquired by the Sam-Sailer family, who were its last feudal owners.

== Demographics ==
Historical population

Year	Pop.	±%
1869	1,221	—
1880	1,310	+7.3%
1890	1,350	+3.1%
1900	1,359	+0.7%
1910	1,450	+6.7%

Year	Pop.	±%
1921	1,434	−1.1%
1930	1,521	+6.1%
1950	1,399	−8.0%
1961	1,457	+4.1%
1970	1,428	−2.0%

Year	Pop.	±%
1980	1,402	−1.8%
1991	1,327	−5.3%
2001	1,402	+5.7%
2011	1,452	+3.6%
2021	1,657	+14.1%

Source: Censuses

== Transport ==
There are no railways or major roads passing through the market town. The train station Kraličky (on the railway line Nezamyslice–Kouty nad Desnou via Prostějov, Olomouc and Šumperk) is located just outside the municipal territory.

== Sights ==
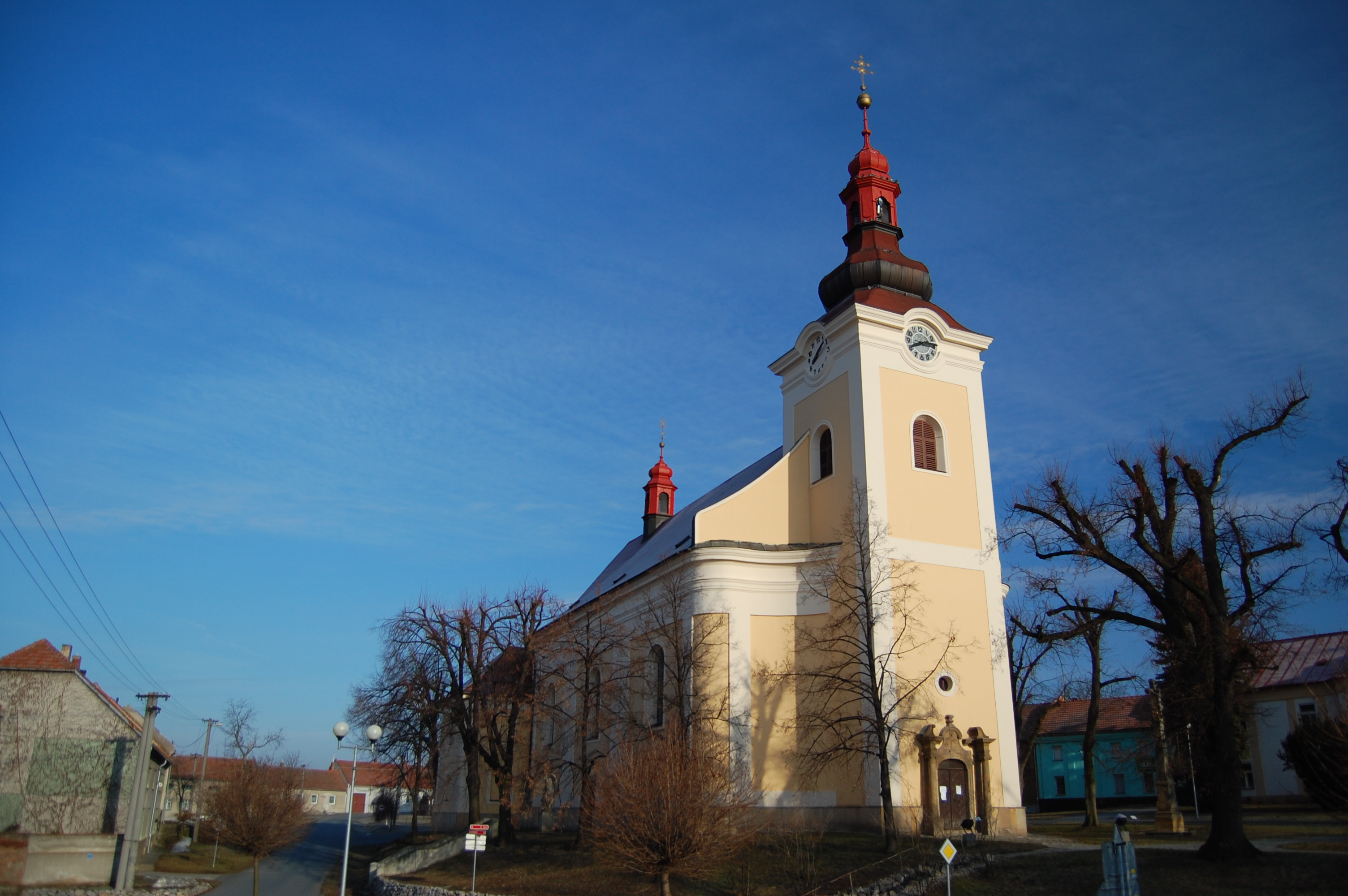
Church of the Assumption of the Virgin Mary

The main landmark of Kralice na Hané is the Church of the Assumption of the Virgin Mary. It was built in the Baroque style in 1790–1793 and later modified.
