= Budětsko =

- Municipality
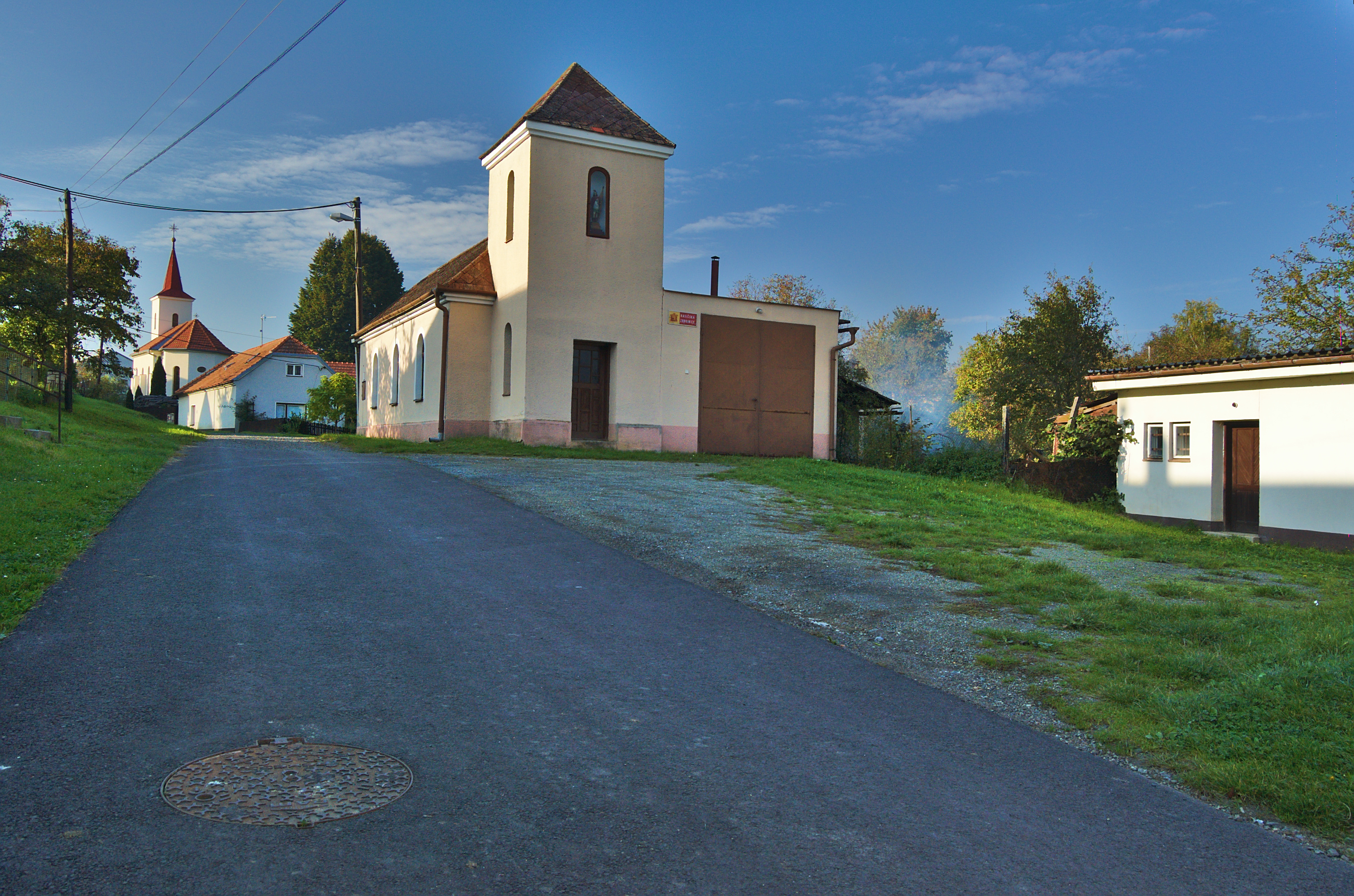
- Firehouse

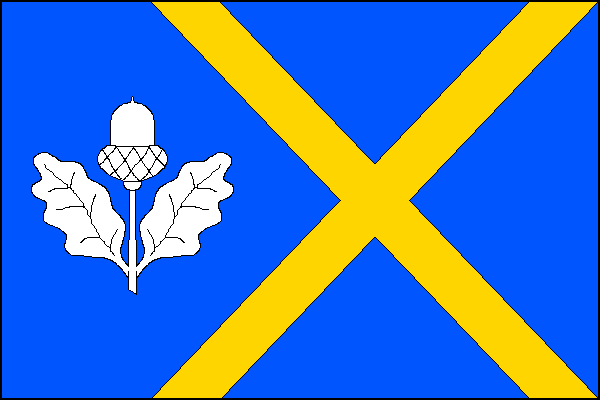
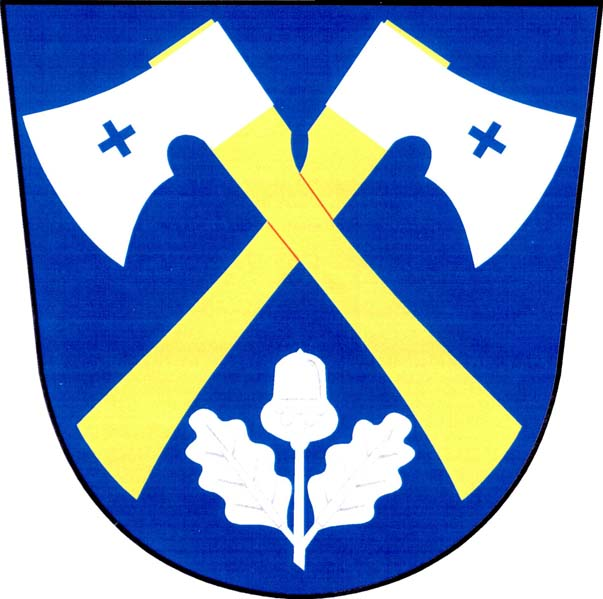
- Flag Coat of arms

- Location in the Czech Republic
- Coordinates: 49°35′13″N 16°55′37″E
- Country: Czech Republic
- Region: Olomouc
- District: Prostějov
- First mentioned: 1378

Area
  - Total: 5.81 km^{2} (2.24 sq mi)
- Elevation: 438 m (1,437 ft)

Population (2026-01-01)
  - Total: 421
  - Density: 72.5/km^{2} (188/sq mi)
- Time zone: UTC+1 (CET)
  - Summer (DST): UTC+2 (CEST)
- Postal code: 798 52
- Website: www.obecbudetsko.cz

Budětsko is a municipality and village in Prostějov District in the Olomouc Region of the Czech Republic. It has about 400 inhabitants.

Budětsko lies approximately 19 kilometres (12 mi) north-west of Prostějov, 24 km (15 mi) west of Olomouc, and 189 km (117 mi) east of Prague.

== Administrative division ==
Budětsko consists of three municipal parts (in brackets population according to the 2021 census):

- Budětsko (303)
- Slavíkov (65)
- Zavadilka (42)

== Demographics ==
Historical population
Year	Pop.	±%
1869	920	—
1880	984	+7.0%
1890	1,021	+3.8%
1900	992	−2.8%
1910	961	−3.1%
1921	953	−0.8%
1930	708	−25.7%
1950	518	−26.8%
1961	515	−0.6%
1970	453	−12.0%
1980	488	+7.7%
1991	465	−4.7%
2001	423	−9.0%
2011	393	−7.1%
2021	410	+4.3%
Source: Censuses
