= Bedihošť =

- Municipality
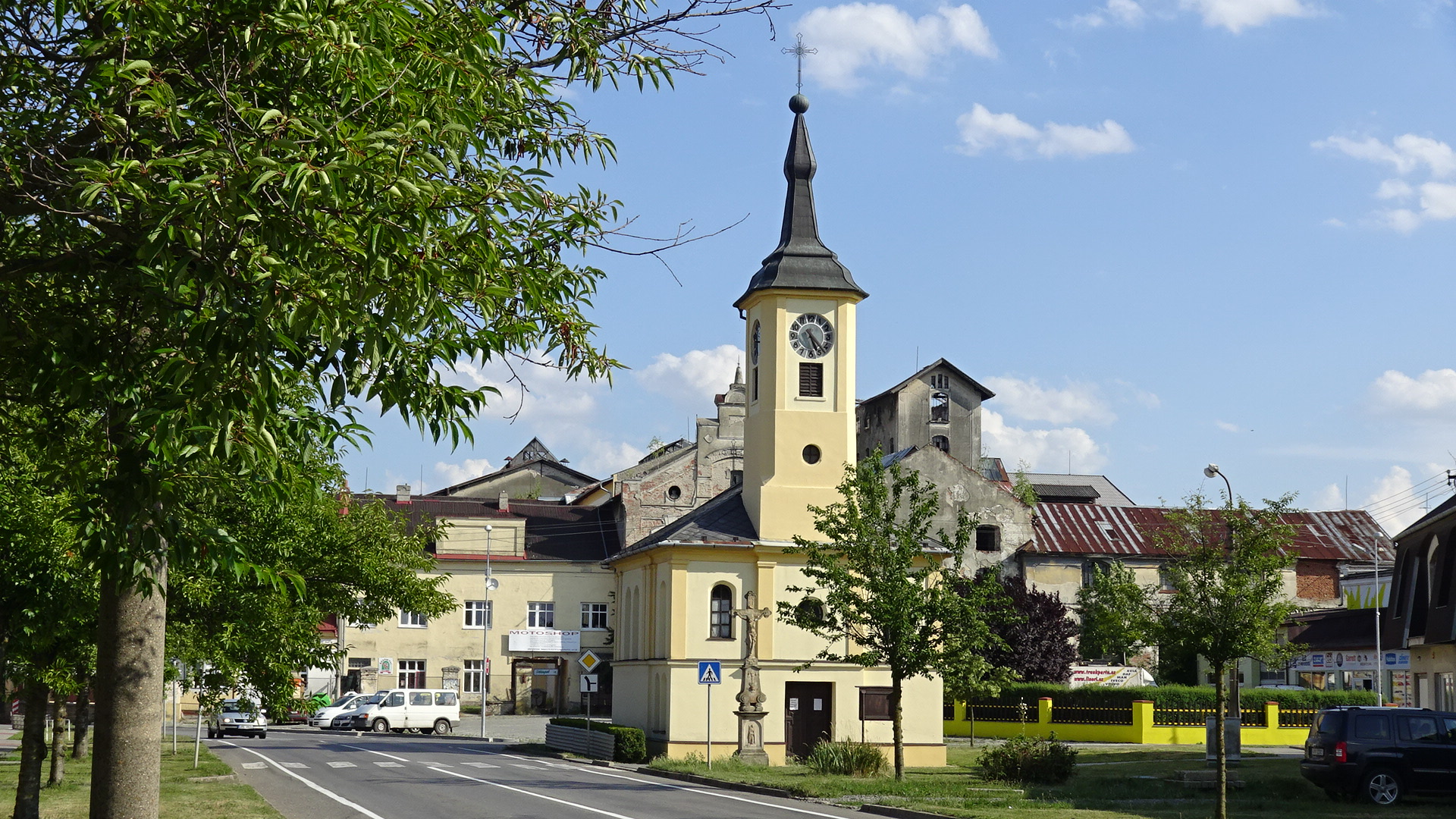
- Chapel of Saint Florian

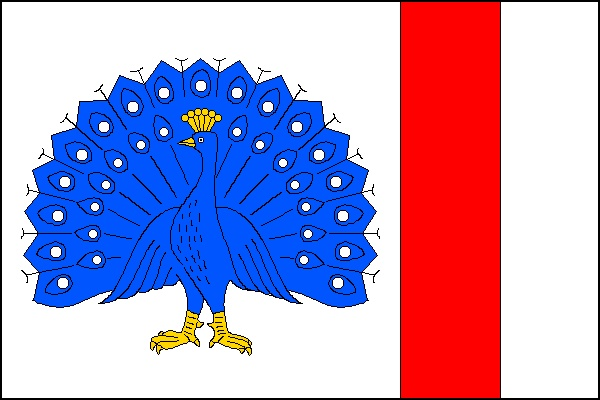
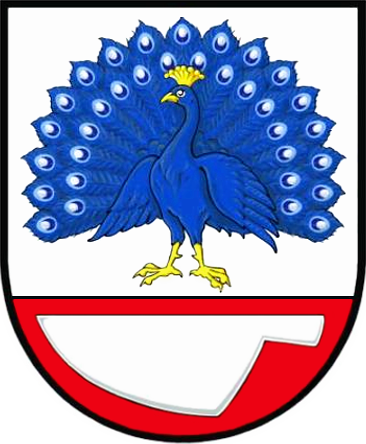
- Flag Coat of arms

- Location in the Czech Republic
- Coordinates: 49°26′54″N 17°9′59″E
- Country: Czech Republic
- Region: Olomouc
- District: Prostějov
- First mentioned: 1275

Area
  - Total: 6.47 km^{2} (2.50 sq mi)
- Elevation: 209 m (686 ft)

Population (2026-01-01)
  - Total: 1,157
  - Density: 179/km^{2} (463/sq mi)
- Time zone: UTC+1 (CET)
  - Summer (DST): UTC+2 (CEST)
- Postal code: 798 21
- Website: www.bedihost.eu

Bedihošť (Czech pronunciation: [ˈbɛɟɪɦoʃc]) is a municipality and village in Prostějov District in the Olomouc Region of the Czech Republic. It has about 1,200 inhabitants.

Bedihošť lies approximately 5 kilometres (3 mi) south-east of Prostějov, 18 km (11 mi) south of Olomouc, and 210 km (130 mi) east of Prague.

== History ==
The first written mention of Bedihošť is from 1275.

== Demographics ==
Historical population
Year	Pop.	±%
1869	891	—
1880	1,064	+19.4%
1890	1,099	+3.3%
1900	1,063	−3.3%
1910	1,406	+32.3%
1921	1,441	+2.5%
1930	1,528	+6.0%
1950	1,198	−21.6%
1961	1,239	+3.4%
1970	1,050	−15.3%
1980	1,109	+5.6%
1991	1,026	−7.5%
2001	1,051	+2.4%
2011	1,019	−3.0%
2021	1,099	+7.9%
Source: Censuses

== Sights ==
Among the main landmarks are the Chapel of Saint Wenceslaus and the Chapel of Saint Florian.
