= Uhřičice =

- Municipality
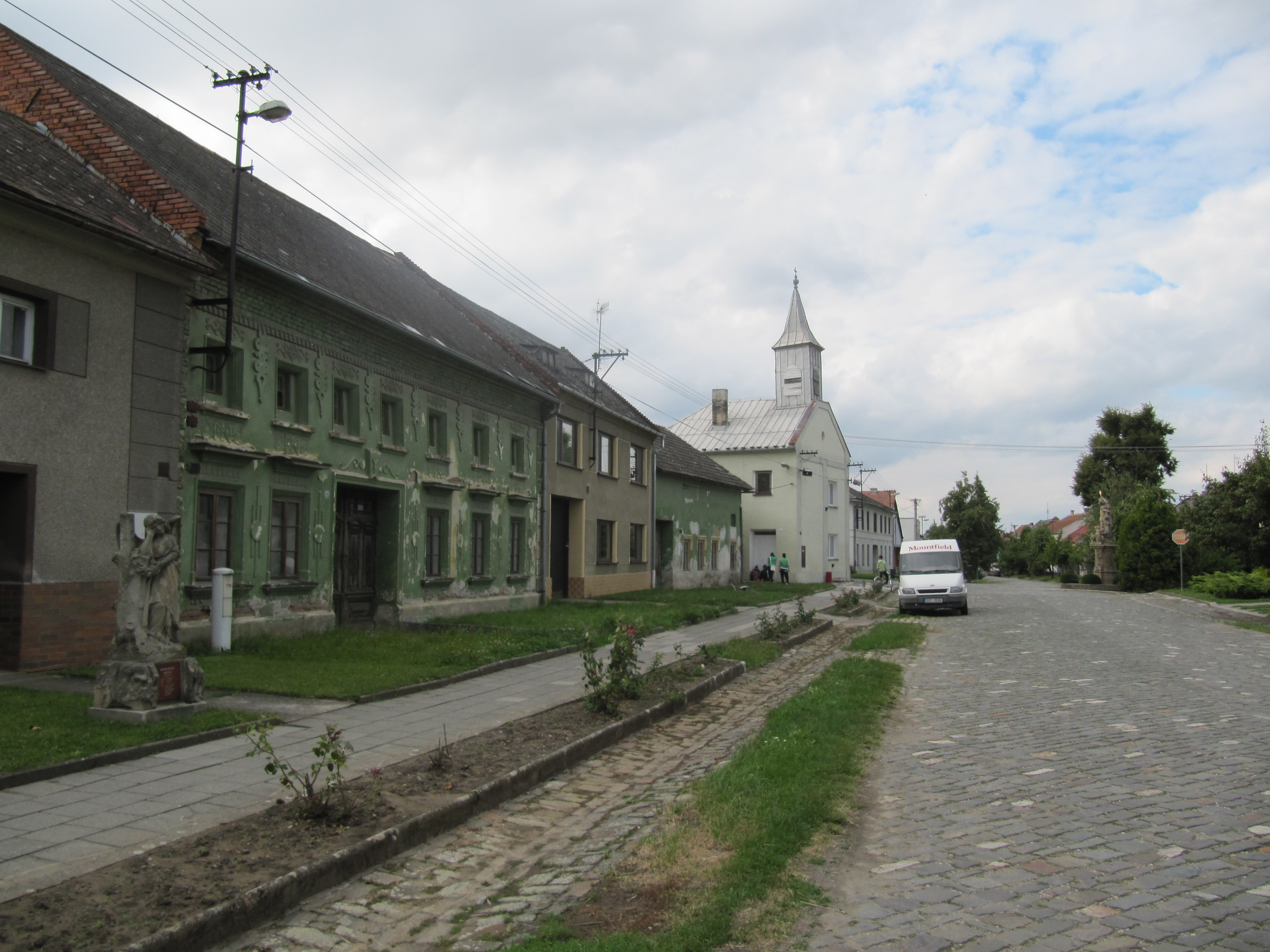
- Centre of Uhřičice

- Flag Coat of arms

- Location in the Czech Republic
- Coordinates: 49°22′18″N 17°17′25″E
- Country: Czech Republic
- Region: Olomouc
- District: Přerov
- First mentioned: 1141

Area
  - Total: 9.22 km^{2} (3.56 sq mi)
- Elevation: 198 m (650 ft)

Population (2026-01-01)
  - Total: 531
  - Density: 57.6/km^{2} (149/sq mi)
- Time zone: UTC+1 (CET)
  - Summer (DST): UTC+2 (CEST)
- Postal code: 752 01
- Website: www.uhricice.cz

Uhřičice is a municipality and village in Přerov District in the Olomouc Region of the Czech Republic. It has about 500 inhabitants.

Uhřičice lies approximately 15 kilometres (9 mi) south-west of Přerov, 25 km (16 mi) south of Olomouc, and 221 km (137 mi) east of Prague.

== Demographics ==
Historical population
Year	Pop.	±%
1869	554	—
1880	593	+7.0%
1890	654	+10.3%
1900	651	−0.5%
1910	748	+14.9%
1921	776	+3.7%
1930	713	−8.1%
1950	636	−10.8%
1961	750	+17.9%
1970	686	−8.5%
1980	648	−5.5%
1991	587	−9.4%
2001	605	+3.1%
2011	579	−4.3%
2021	508	−12.3%
Source: Censuses

== Notable people ==
- Jan Tomáš Kuzník (1716–1786), composer, poet and teacher
