= Jan Hrbatý =

Czech ice hockey player (1942–2019)

- Born: 20 January 1942; Stražisko, Bohemia and Moravia
- Died: 23 July 2019 (aged 77)
- Height: 5 ft 7 in (170 cm)
- Weight: 154 lb (70 kg; 11 st 0 lb)
- Position: Forward
- Shot: Left
- Played for: ASD Dukla Jihlava
- National team: Czechoslovakia
- Playing career: 1961–1980

Jan Hrbatý
Medal record

Representing Czechoslovakia

Men's ice hockey
Silver medal – second place	1968 Grenoble	Team

Jan Hrbatý (20 January 1942 – 23 July 2019) was a Czech ice hockey player who played for the Czechoslovak national team. He won a silver medal at the 1968 Winter Olympics.
