= Dzbel =

- Municipality
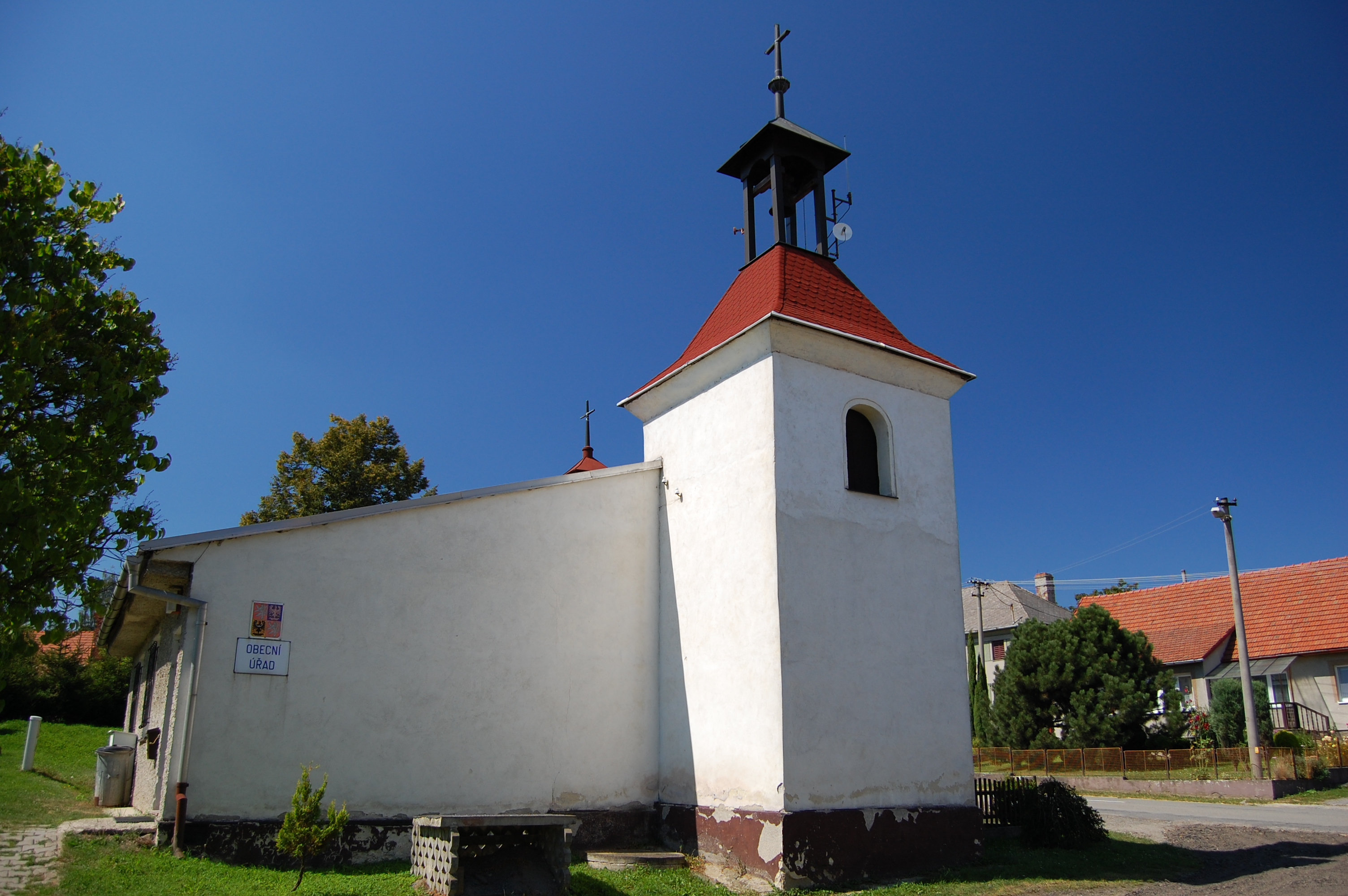
- Municipal office and a belfry

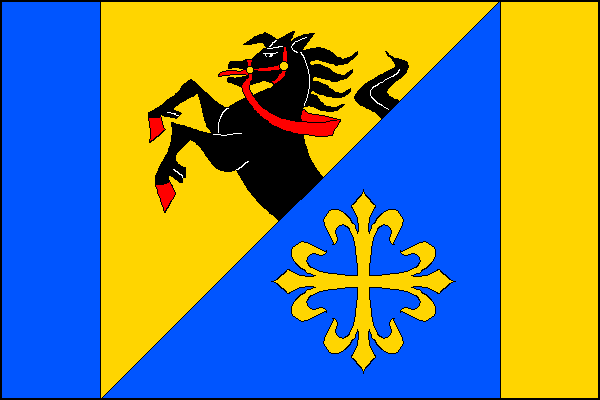
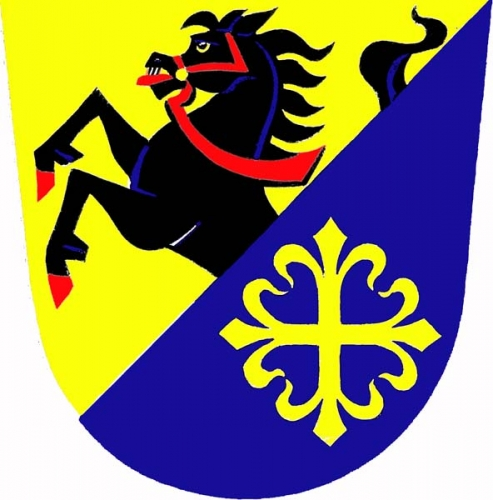
- Flag Coat of arms

- Location in the Czech Republic
- Coordinates: 49°36′46″N 16°51′3″E
- Country: Czech Republic
- Region: Olomouc
- District: Prostějov
- First mentioned: 1351

Area
  - Total: 7.45 km^{2} (2.88 sq mi)
- Elevation: 493 m (1,617 ft)

Population (2026-01-01)
  - Total: 247
  - Density: 33.2/km^{2} (85.9/sq mi)
- Time zone: UTC+1 (CET)
  - Summer (DST): UTC+2 (CEST)
- Postal code: 798 53
- Website: www.obecdzbel.cz

Dzbel is a municipality and village in Prostějov District in the Olomouc Region of the Czech Republic. It has about 200 inhabitants.

Dzbel lies approximately 26 kilometres (16 mi) north-west of Prostějov, 30 km (19 mi) west of Olomouc, and 182 km (113 mi) east of Prague. The Romže River originates in the municipality.

== Demographics ==
Historical population
Year	Pop.	±%
1869	611	—
1880	642	+5.1%
1890	611	−4.8%
1900	572	−6.4%
1910	575	+0.5%
1921	551	−4.2%
1930	519	−5.8%
1950	368	−29.1%
1961	387	+5.2%
1970	330	−14.7%
1980	320	−3.0%
1991	295	−7.8%
2001	279	−5.4%
2011	252	−9.7%
2021	219	−13.1%
Source: Censuses
