= Alojzov =

- Municipality
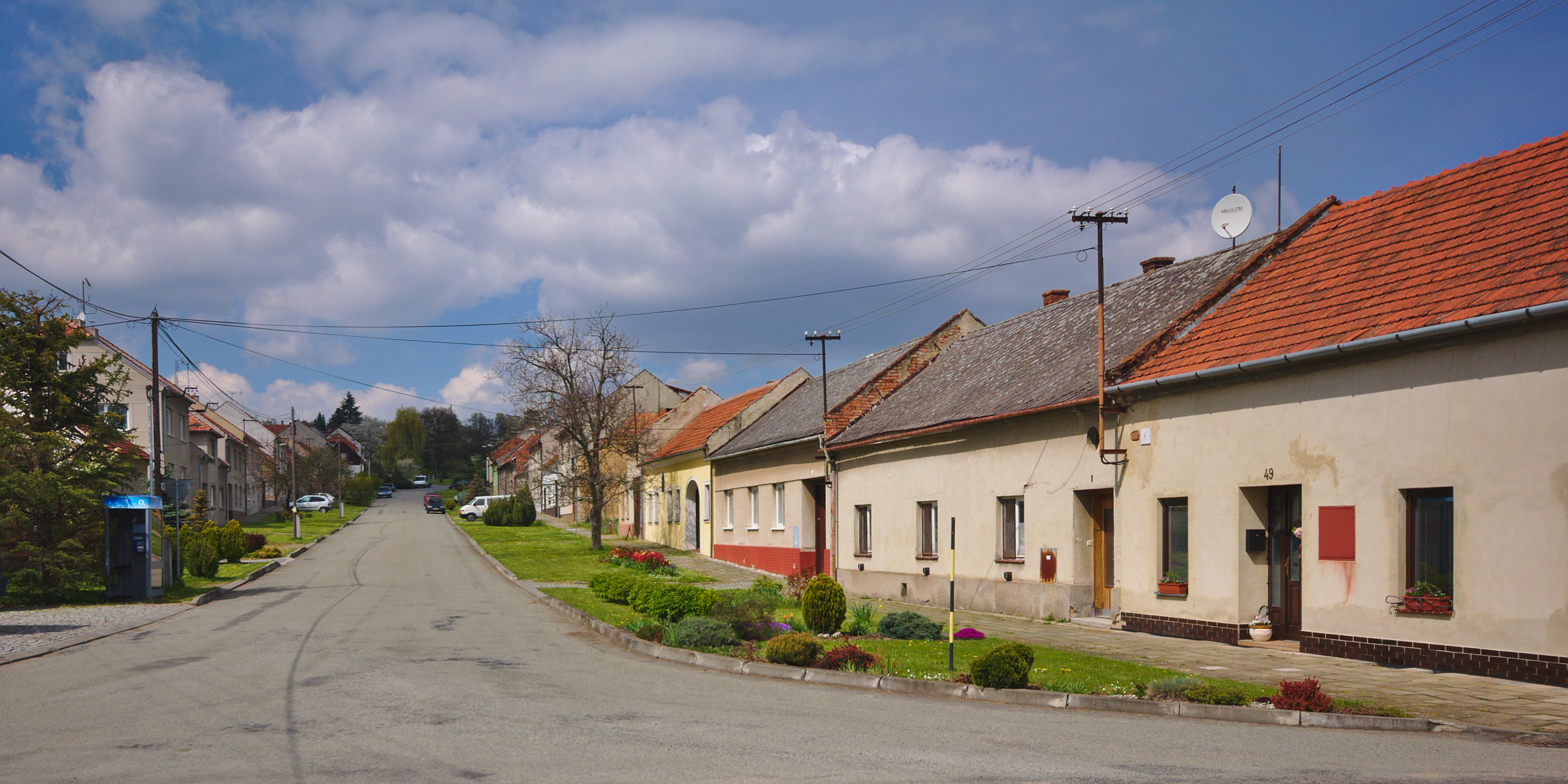
- Centre of Alojzov

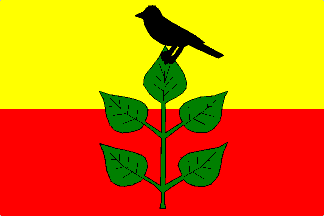
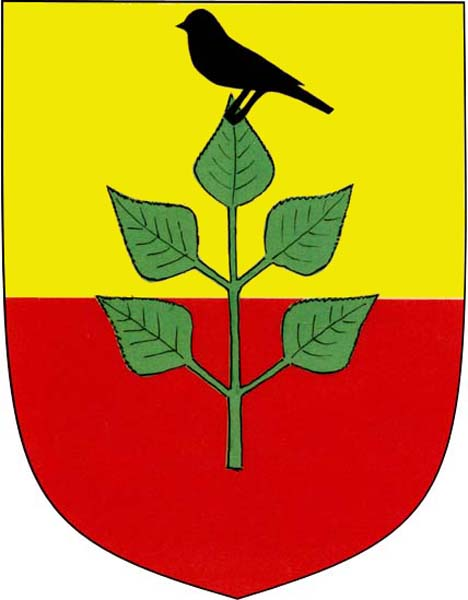
- Flag Coat of arms

- Location in the Czech Republic
- Coordinates: 49°25′24″N 17°2′29″E
- Country: Czech Republic
- Region: Olomouc
- District: Prostějov
- Founded: 1783

Area
  - Total: 4.64 km^{2} (1.79 sq mi)
- Elevation: 392 m (1,286 ft)

Population (2026-01-01)
  - Total: 259
  - Density: 55.8/km^{2} (145/sq mi)
- Time zone: UTC+1 (CET)
  - Summer (DST): UTC+2 (CEST)
- Postal code: 798 04
- Website: www.alojzov.cz

Alojzov (German: Aloisdorf) is a municipality and village in Prostějov District in the Olomouc Region of the Czech Republic. It has about 300 inhabitants.

== Etymology ==
The village was named after Prince Aloys I of Liechtenstein, who ruled the area when the village was founded.

== Geography ==
Alojzov is located about 7 kilometres (4 mi) southwest of Prostějov and 23 km (14 mi) southwest of Olomouc. It lies in the Drahany Highlands. The highest point is the hill Spálený kopec at 433 m (1,421 ft) above sea level.

== History ==
Alojzov was founded in 1783 in the estate that belonged to the Liechtenstein family from 1595. In 1848, when the feudal administration ended, Alojzov became a municipal part of Seloutky. The village was hit by the Austro-Prussian War in 1866 and a large fire in 1888. In 1922, Alojzov became an independent municipality.

== Demographics ==
Historical population

Year	Pop.	±%
1869	228	—
1880	290	+27.2%
1890	281	−3.1%
1900	302	+7.5%
1910	295	−2.3%

Year	Pop.	±%
1921	300	+1.7%
1930	282	−6.0%
1950	215	−23.8%
1961	237	+10.2%
1970	256	+8.0%

Year	Pop.	±%
1980	243	−5.1%
1991	197	−18.9%
2001	207	+5.1%
2011	230	+11.1%
2021	261	+13.5%

Source: Censuses

== Transport ==
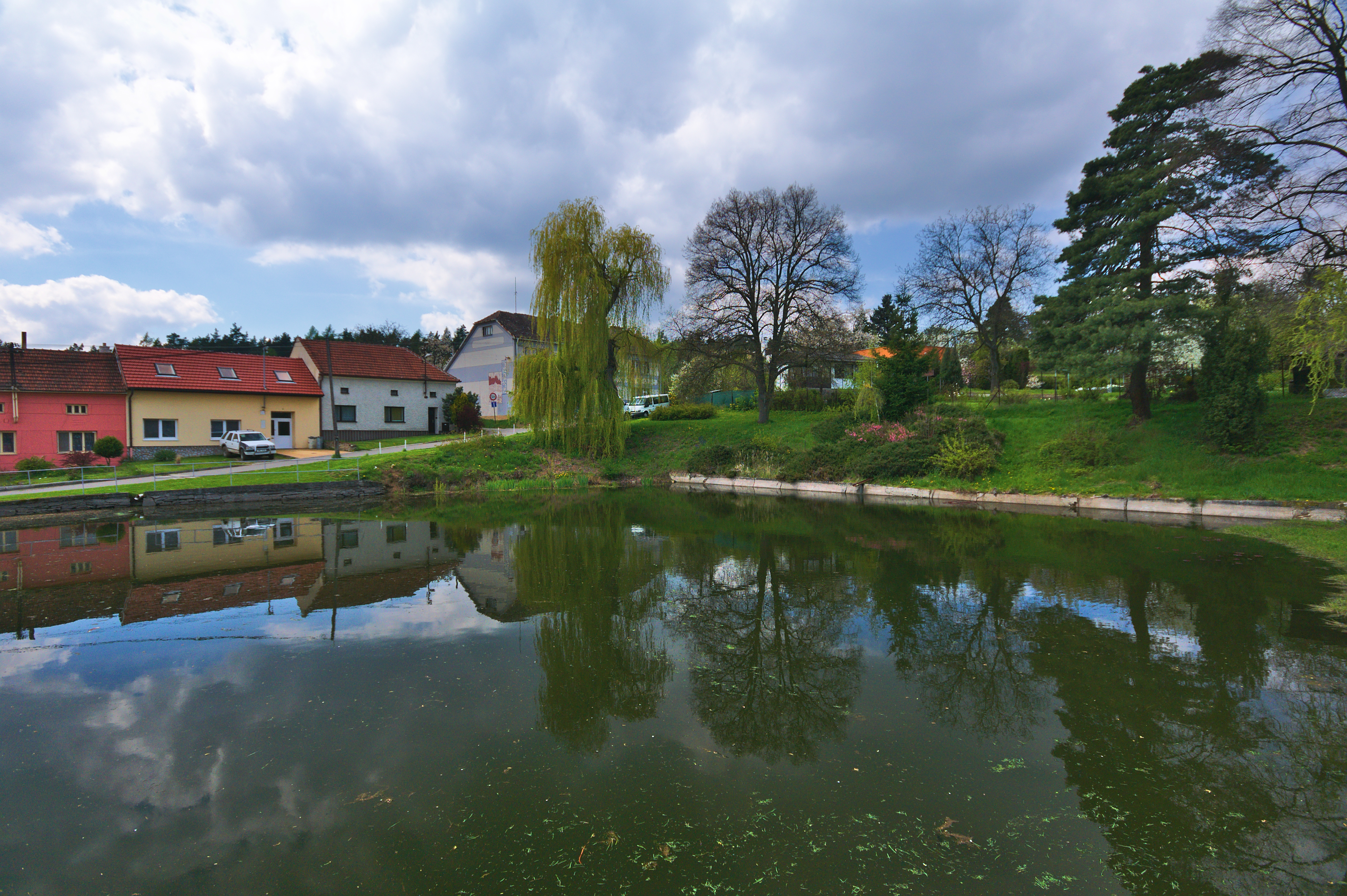
Northern part of Alojzov

There are no railways or major roads passing through the municipality.

== Sights ==
There are no protected cultural monuments in the municipality.
