= Seloutky =

- Municipality
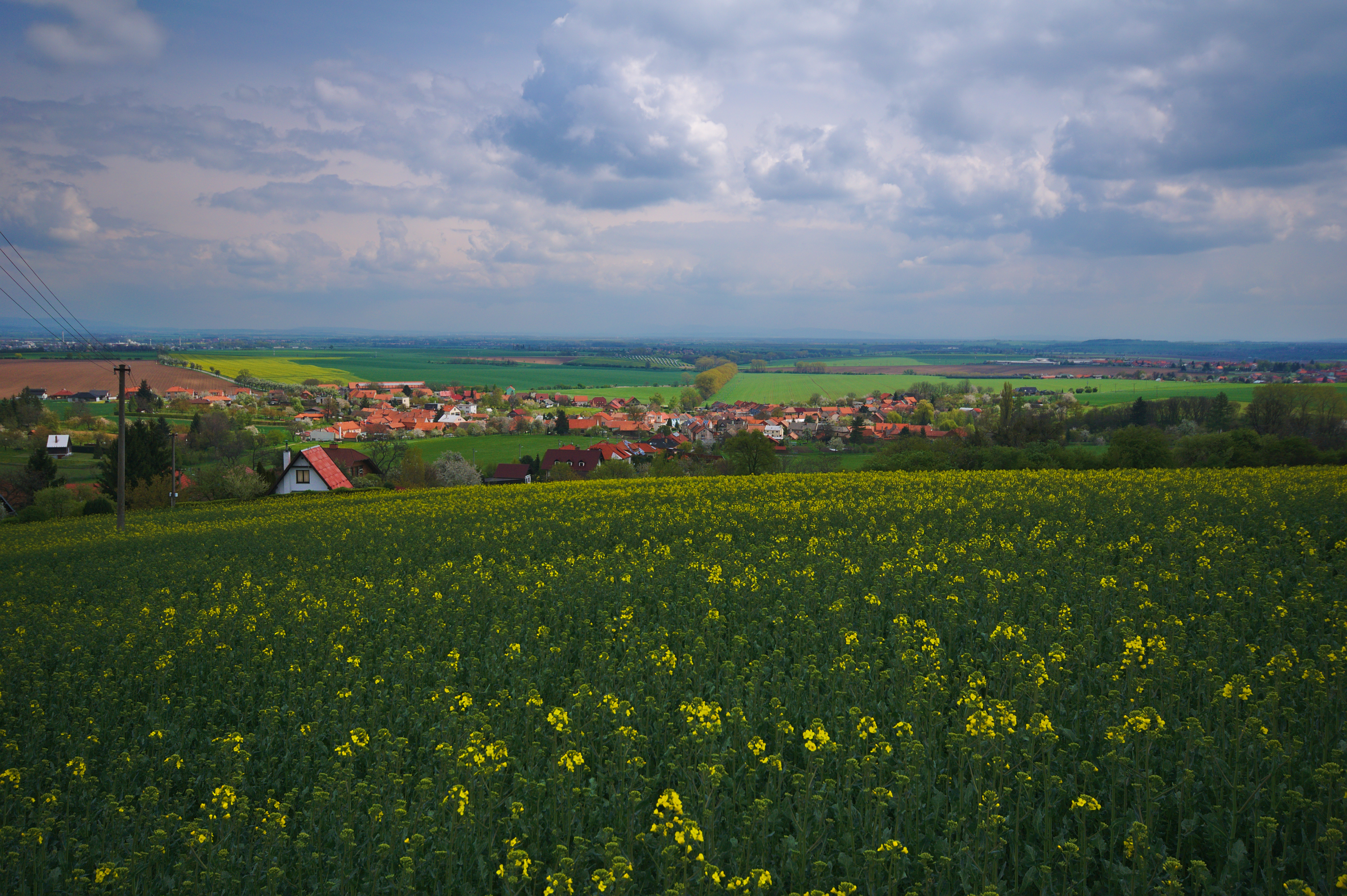
- View from the west

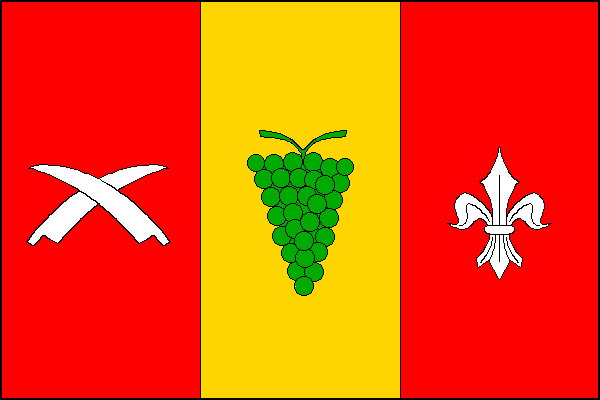
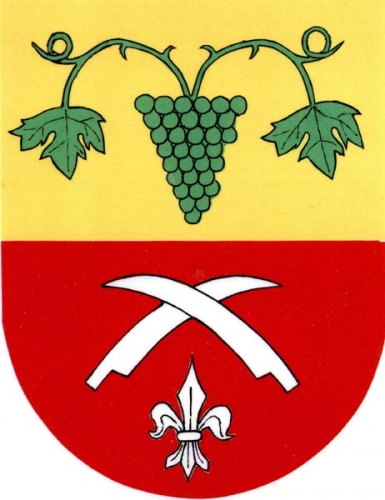
- Flag Coat of arms

- Location in the Czech Republic
- Coordinates: 49°26′29″N 17°3′48″E
- Country: Czech Republic
- Region: Olomouc
- District: Prostějov
- First mentioned: 1325

Area
  - Total: 7.16 km^{2} (2.76 sq mi)
- Elevation: 256 m (840 ft)

Population (2026-01-01)
  - Total: 543
  - Density: 75.8/km^{2} (196/sq mi)
- Time zone: UTC+1 (CET)
  - Summer (DST): UTC+2 (CEST)
- Postal code: 798 04
- Website: seloutky.cz

Seloutky is a municipality and village in Prostějov District in the Olomouc Region of the Czech Republic. It has about 500 inhabitants.

Seloutky lies approximately 6 kilometres (4 mi) south-west of Prostějov, 22 km (14 mi) south-west of Olomouc, and 203 km (126 mi) east of Prague.

== Demographics ==
Historical population
Year	Pop.	±%
1869	437	—
1880	462	+5.7%
1890	496	+7.4%
1900	505	+1.8%
1910	563	+11.5%
1921	558	−0.9%
1930	529	−5.2%
1950	521	−1.5%
1961	543	+4.2%
1970	518	−4.6%
1980	462	−10.8%
1991	411	−11.0%
2001	430	+4.6%
2011	495	+15.1%
2021	508	+2.6%
Source: Censuses
