= Pěnčín =

Pěnčín may refer to places in the Czech Republic:

- Pěnčín (Jablonec nad Nisou District), a municipality and village in the Liberec Region
- Pěnčín (Liberec District), a municipality and village in the Liberec Region
- Pěnčín (Prostějov District), a municipality and village in the Olomouc Region
