= Pěnčín (Prostějov District) =

- Municipality
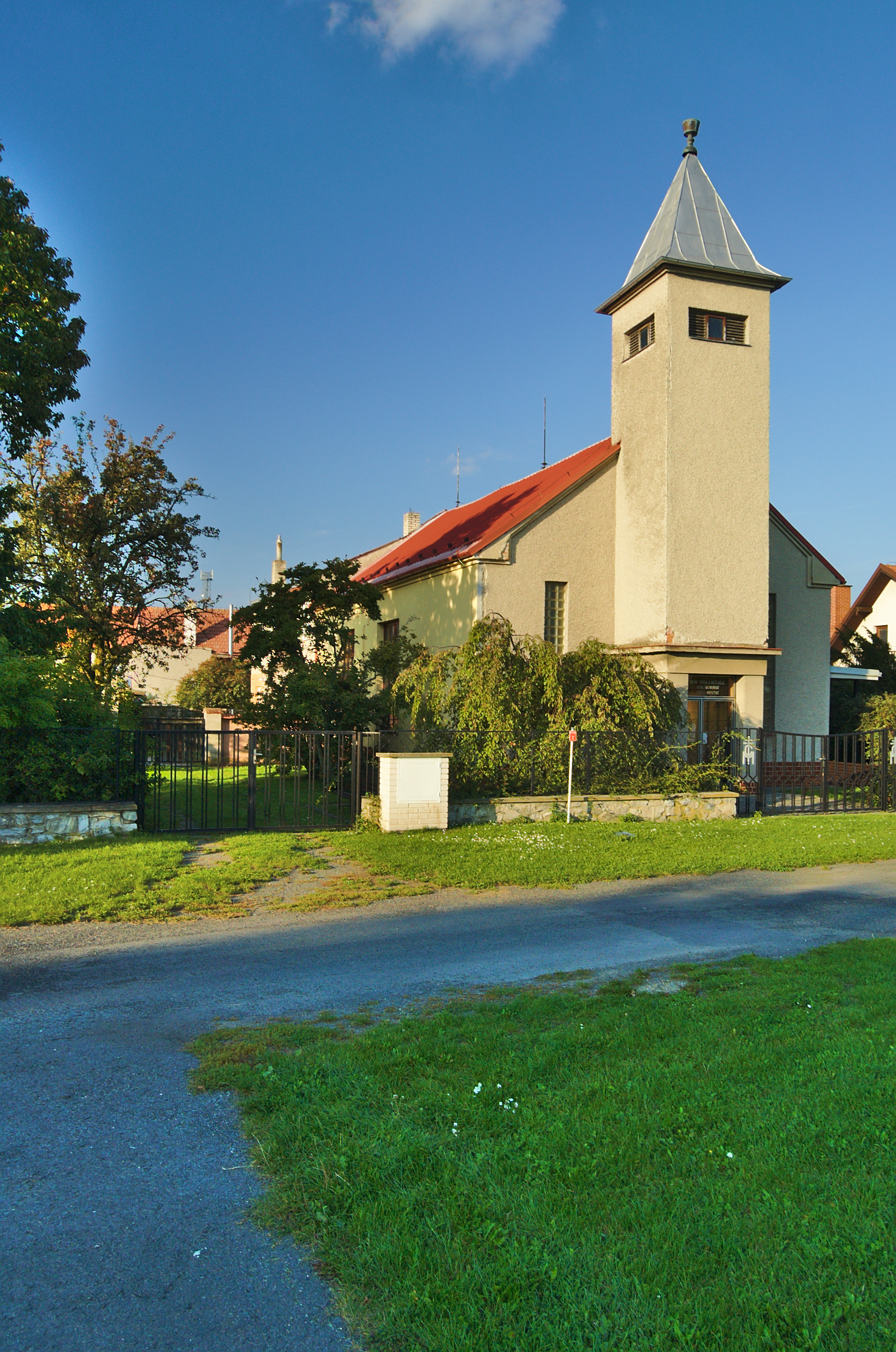
- Church of Saints Cyril and Methodius

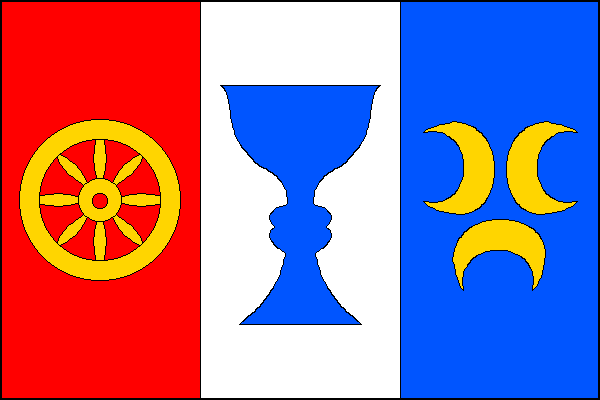
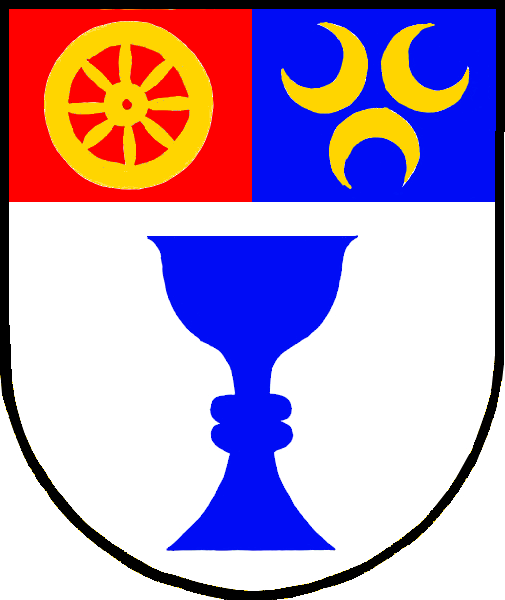
- Flag Coat of arms

- Location in the Czech Republic
- Coordinates: 49°34′2″N 17°0′47″E
- Country: Czech Republic
- Region: Olomouc
- District: Prostějov
- First mentioned: 1279

Area
  - Total: 5.32 km^{2} (2.05 sq mi)
- Elevation: 334 m (1,096 ft)

Population (2026-01-01)
  - Total: 769
  - Density: 145/km^{2} (374/sq mi)
- Time zone: UTC+1 (CET)
  - Summer (DST): UTC+2 (CEST)
- Postal code: 798 57
- Website: www.obecpencin.cz

Pěnčín (Czech pronunciation: [ˈpjɛntʃiːn]) is a municipality and village in Prostějov District in the Olomouc Region of the Czech Republic. It has about 800 inhabitants.

Pěnčín lies approximately 13 kilometres (8 mi) north-west of Prostějov, 18 km (11 mi) west of Olomouc, and 195 km (121 mi) east of Prague.

== Demographics ==
Historical population
Year	Pop.	±%
1869	822	—
1880	917	+11.6%
1890	967	+5.5%
1900	1,007	+4.1%
1910	937	−7.0%
1921	963	+2.8%
1930	941	−2.3%
1950	857	−8.9%
1961	846	−1.3%
1970	782	−7.6%
1980	751	−4.0%
1991	728	−3.1%
2001	723	−0.7%
2011	740	+2.4%
2021	733	−0.9%
Source: Censuses
