= Prostějovičky =

- Municipality
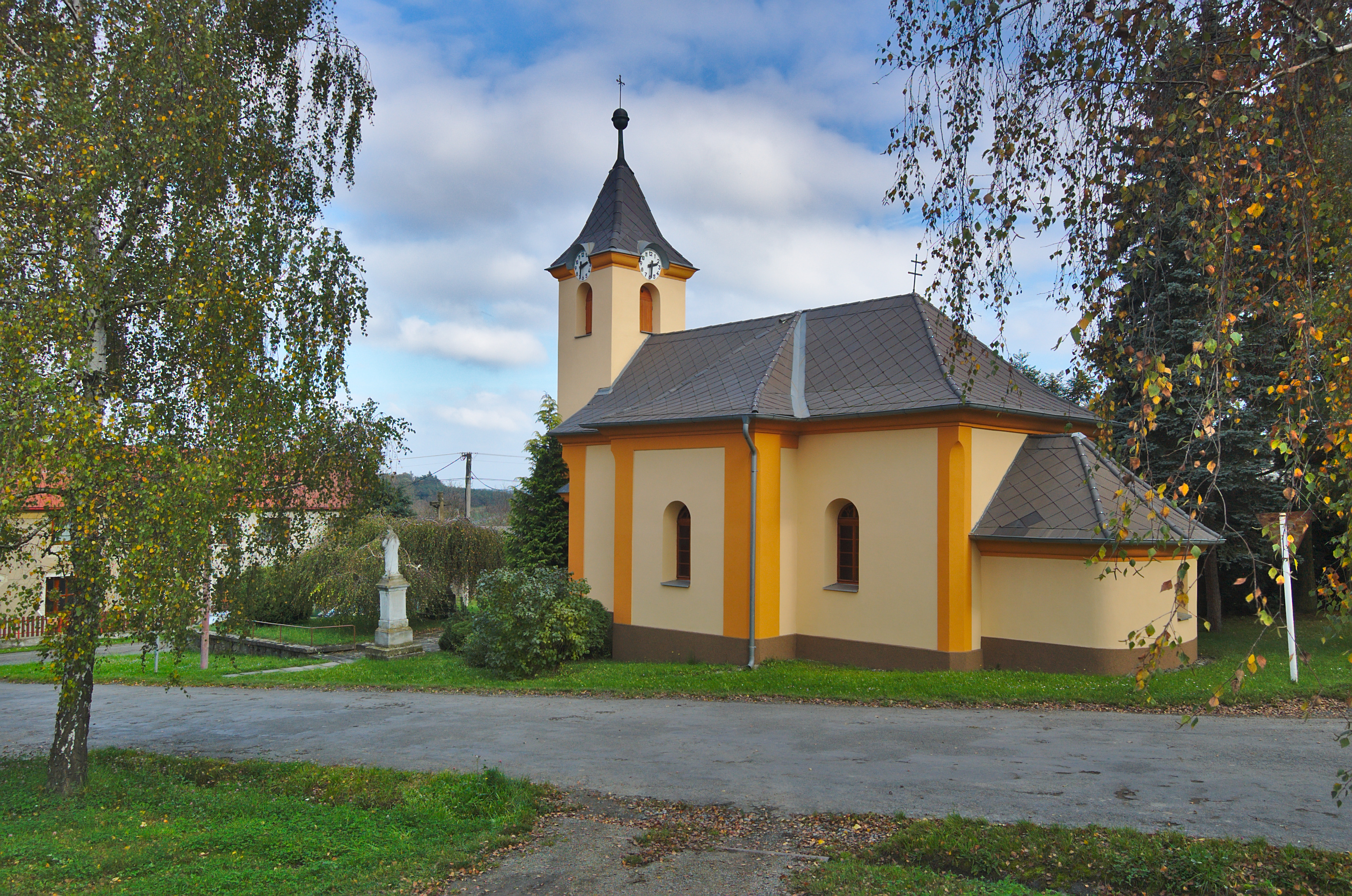
- Chapel of Saint Anne

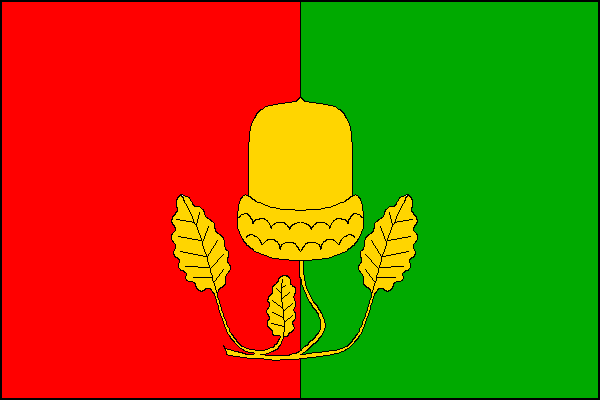
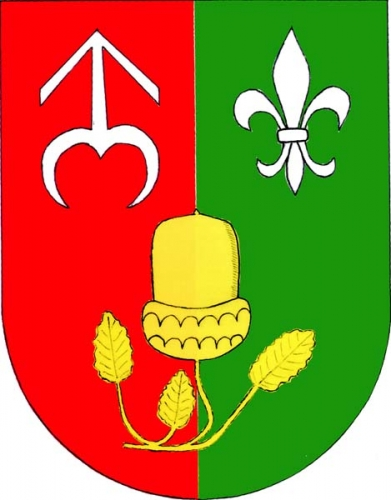
- Flag Coat of arms

- Location in the Czech Republic
- Coordinates: 49°25′46″N 17°0′10″E
- Country: Czech Republic
- Region: Olomouc
- District: Prostějov
- First mentioned: 1347

Area
  - Total: 3.15 km^{2} (1.22 sq mi)
- Elevation: 382 m (1,253 ft)

Population (2026-01-01)
  - Total: 311
  - Density: 98.7/km^{2} (256/sq mi)
- Time zone: UTC+1 (CET)
  - Summer (DST): UTC+2 (CEST)
- Postal code: 798 03
- Website: prostejovicky.cz

Prostějovičky is a municipality and village in Prostějov District in the Olomouc Region of the Czech Republic. It has about 300 inhabitants.

Prostějovičky lies approximately 9 kilometres (6 mi) south-west of Prostějov, 26 km (16 mi) south-west of Olomouc, and 200 km (120 mi) east of Prague.

== Demographics ==
Historical population
Year	Pop.	±%
1869	276	—
1880	300	+8.7%
1890	311	+3.7%
1900	342	+10.0%
1910	357	+4.4%
1921	370	+3.6%
1930	389	+5.1%
1950	337	−13.4%
1961	334	−0.9%
1970	318	−4.8%
1980	281	−11.6%
1991	241	−14.2%
2001	259	+7.5%
2011	277	+6.9%
2021	306	+10.5%
Source: Censuses
