= Opatovice =

Opatovice may refer to places in the Czech Republic:

- Opatovice (Brno-Country District), a municipality and village in the South Moravian Region
- Opatovice (Přerov District), a municipality and village in the Olomouc Region
- Opatovice, a village and part of Hrdějovice in the South Bohemian Region
- Opatovice, a village and part of Světlá nad Sázavou in the Vysočina Region
- Opatovice, a village and part of Vyškov in the South Moravian Region
- Opatovice, a village and part of Zbýšov (Kutná Hora District) in the Central Bohemian Region
- Opatovice I, a municipality and village in the Central Bohemian Region
- Opatovice II, a village and part of Uhlířské Janovice in the Central Bohemian Region
- Opatovice nad Labem, a municipality and village in the Pardubice Region
- Velké Opatovice, a town in the South Moravian Region
