= Dolní Nětčice =

- Municipality
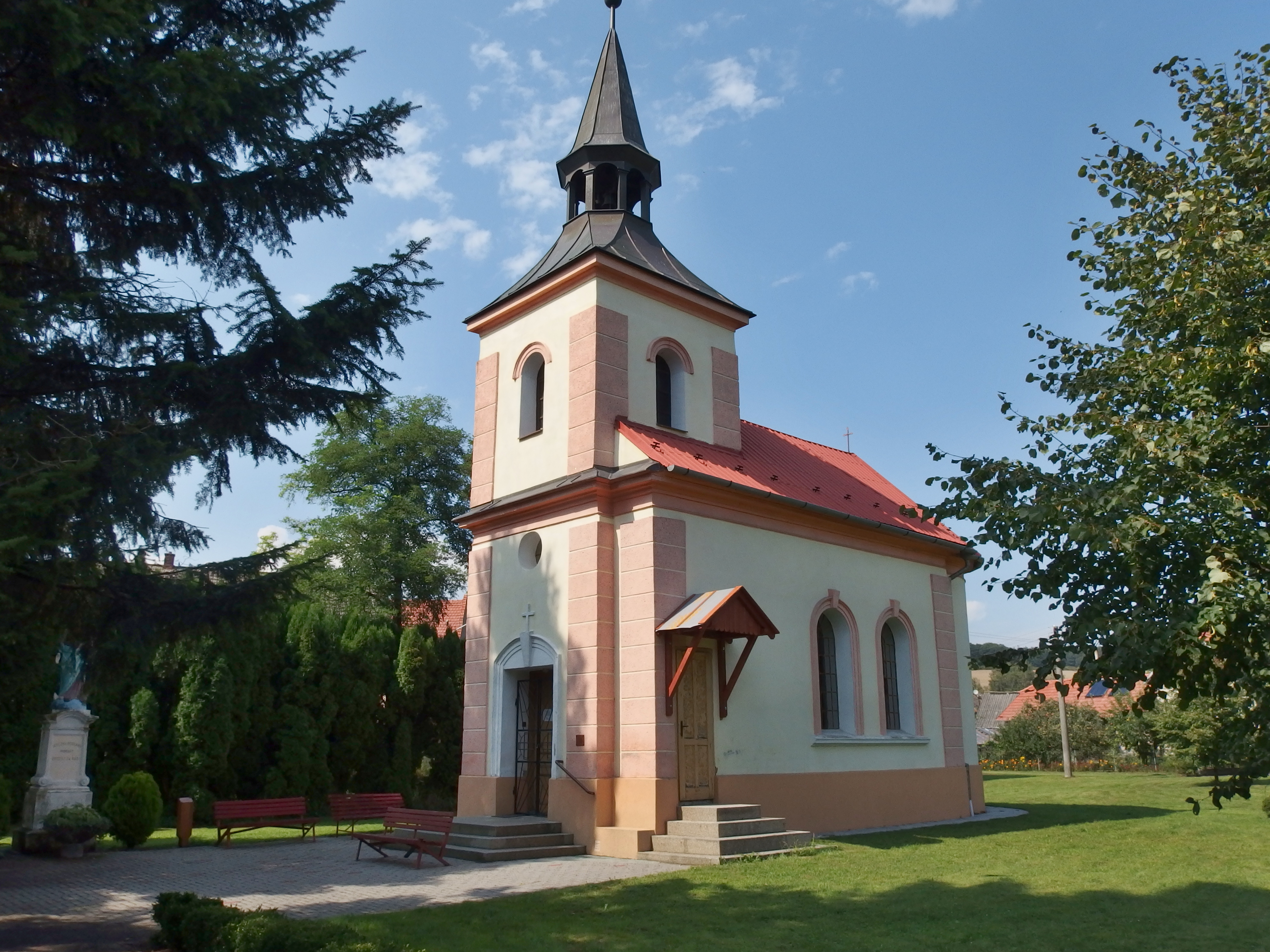
- Chapel of the Visitation of Our Lady

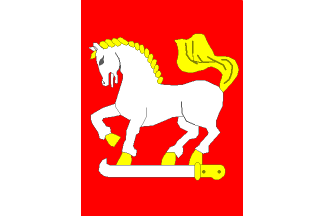
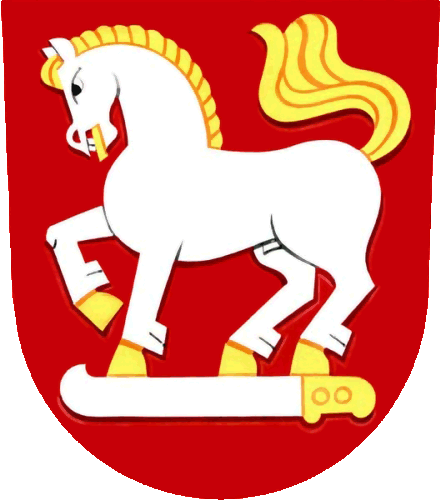
- Flag Coat of arms

- Location in the Czech Republic
- Coordinates: 49°28′34″N 17°40′30″E
- Country: Czech Republic
- Region: Olomouc
- District: Přerov
- First mentioned: 1384

Area
  - Total: 4.20 km^{2} (1.62 sq mi)
- Elevation: 277 m (909 ft)

Population (2026-01-01)
  - Total: 260
  - Density: 62/km^{2} (160/sq mi)
- Time zone: UTC+1 (CET)
  - Summer (DST): UTC+2 (CEST)
- Postal code: 753 54
- Website: www.dolninetcice.cz

Dolní Nětčice is a municipality and village in Přerov District in the Olomouc Region of the Czech Republic. It has about 300 inhabitants.

Dolní Nětčice lies approximately 17 kilometres (11 mi) east of Přerov, 34 km (21 mi) south-east of Olomouc, and 244 km (152 mi) east of Prague.

== Demographics ==
Historical population
| Year | Pop. | ±% |
|---|---|---|
| 1869 | 350 | — |
| 1880 | 381 | +8.9% |
| 1890 | 372 | −2.4% |
| 1900 | 361 | −3.0% |
| 1910 | 436 | +20.8% |
| 1921 | 427 | −2.1% |
| 1930 | 444 | +4.0% |
| 1950 | 438 | −1.4% |
| 1961 | 458 | +4.6% |
| 1970 | 416 | −9.2% |
| 1980 | 372 | −10.6% |
| 1991 | 333 | −10.5% |
| 2001 | 302 | −9.3% |
| 2011 | 265 | −12.3% |
| 2021 | 246 | −7.2% |
Source: Censuses
