= Horní Nětčice =

- Municipality
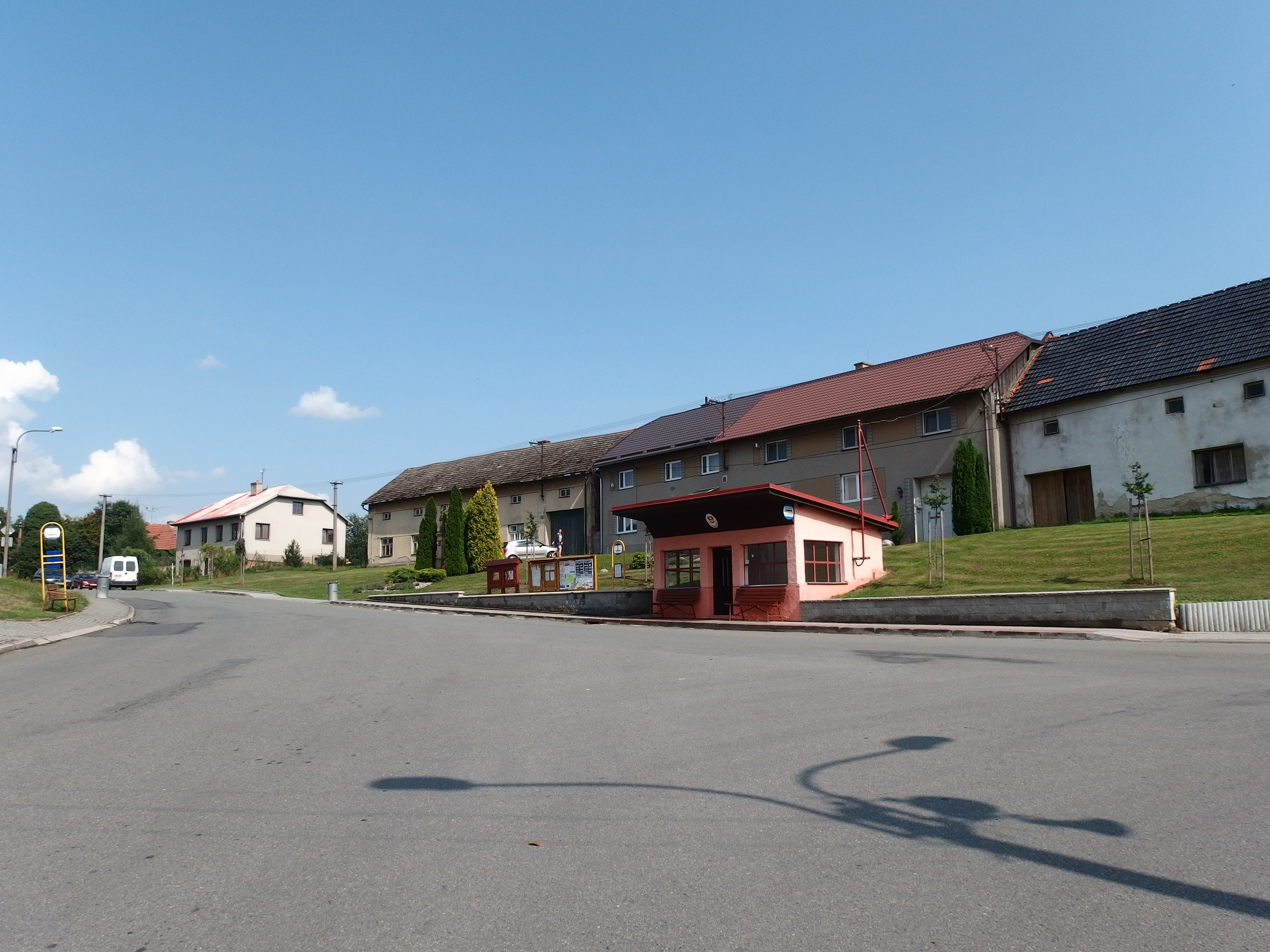
- Centre of Horní Nětčice

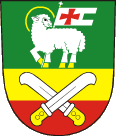
- Flag Coat of arms

- Location in the Czech Republic
- Coordinates: 49°28′13″N 17°41′4″E
- Country: Czech Republic
- Region: Olomouc
- District: Přerov
- First mentioned: 1384

Area
  - Total: 4.54 km^{2} (1.75 sq mi)
- Elevation: 312 m (1,024 ft)

Population (2026-01-01)
  - Total: 229
  - Density: 50.4/km^{2} (131/sq mi)
- Time zone: UTC+1 (CET)
  - Summer (DST): UTC+2 (CEST)
- Postal code: 753 54
- Website: www.horninetcice.cz

Horní Nětčice is a municipality and village in Přerov District in the Olomouc Region of the Czech Republic. It has about 200 inhabitants.

Horní Nětčice lies approximately 19 kilometres (12 mi) east of Přerov, 36 km (22 mi) east of Olomouc, and 246 km (153 mi) east of Prague.

== Demographics ==
Historical population
Year	Pop.	±%
1869	324	—
1880	367	+13.3%
1890	371	+1.1%
1900	362	−2.4%
1910	374	+3.3%
1921	378	+1.1%
1930	363	−4.0%
1950	307	−15.4%
1961	323	+5.2%
1970	282	−12.7%
1980	246	−12.8%
1991	204	−17.1%
2001	204	+0.0%
2011	223	+9.3%
2021	216	−3.1%
Source: Censuses
