= Rouské =

- Municipality
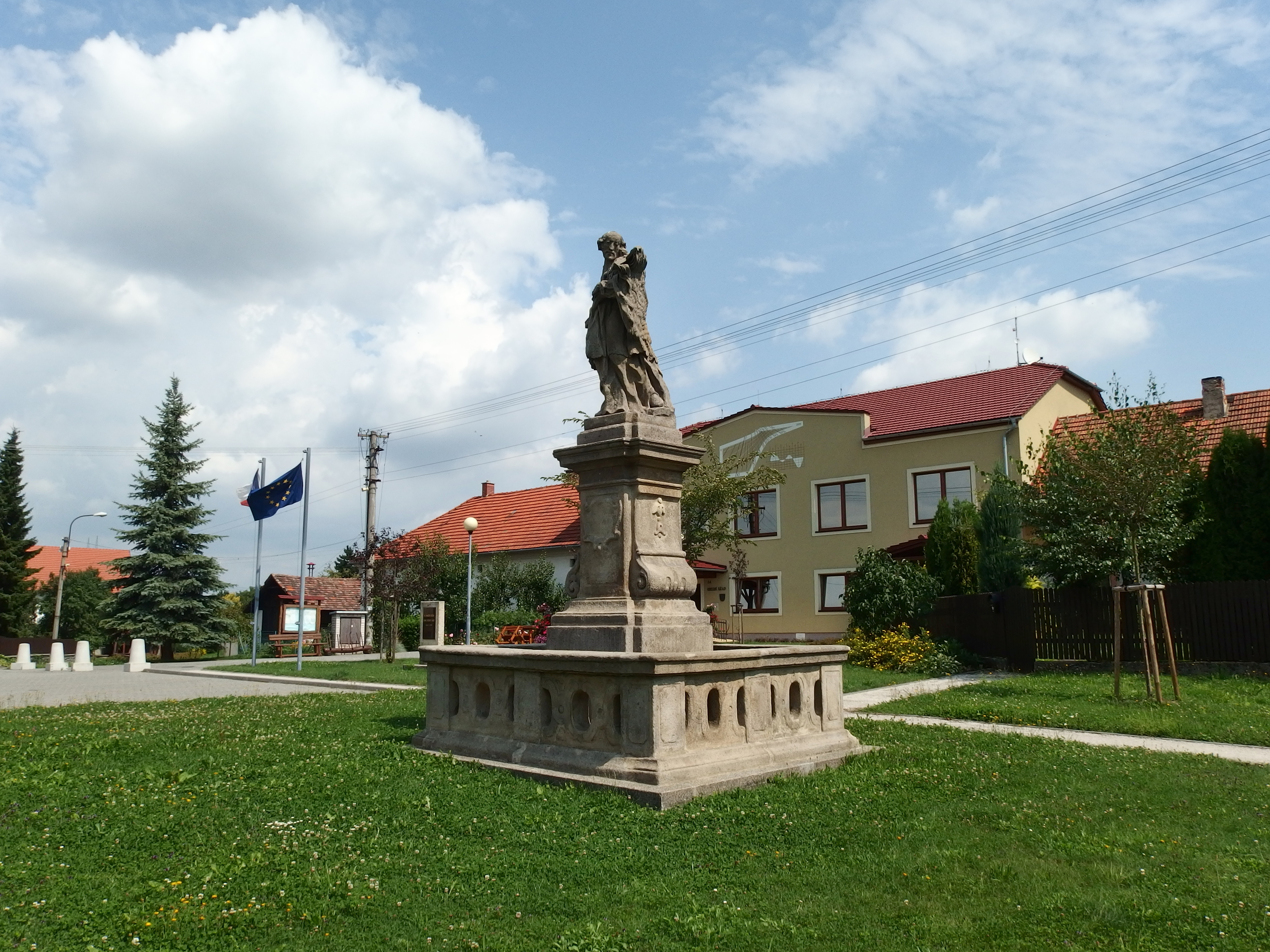
- Statue of Saint John of Nepomuk in front of the municipal office

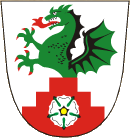
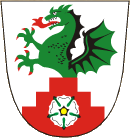
- Flag Coat of arms

- Location in the Czech Republic
- Coordinates: 49°28′18″N 17°46′45″E
- Country: Czech Republic
- Region: Olomouc
- District: Přerov
- First mentioned: 1320

Area
  - Total: 5.31 km^{2} (2.05 sq mi)
- Elevation: 357 m (1,171 ft)

Population (2026-01-01)
  - Total: 266
  - Density: 50.1/km^{2} (130/sq mi)
- Time zone: UTC+1 (CET)
  - Summer (DST): UTC+2 (CEST)
- Postal code: 753 53
- Website: www.rouske.cz

Rouské is a municipality and village in Přerov District in the Olomouc Region of the Czech Republic. It has about 300 inhabitants.

Rouské lies approximately 25 kilometres (16 mi) east of Přerov, 41 km (25 mi) east of Olomouc, and 252 km (157 mi) east of Prague.

== History ==
The first written mention of Rouské is from 1320. From 1653 until the establishment of a sovereign municipality, the village belonged to the Kelč estate.

== Demographics ==
Historical population
| Year | Pop. | ±% |
|---|---|---|
| 1869 | 316 | — |
| 1880 | 357 | +13.0% |
| 1890 | 350 | −2.0% |
| 1900 | 353 | +0.9% |
| 1910 | 352 | −0.3% |
| 1921 | 366 | +4.0% |
| 1930 | 337 | −7.9% |
| 1950 | 329 | −2.4% |
| 1961 | 306 | −7.0% |
| 1970 | 282 | −7.8% |
| 1980 | 265 | −6.0% |
| 1991 | 254 | −4.2% |
| 2001 | 249 | −2.0% |
| 2011 | 240 | −3.6% |
| 2021 | 263 | +9.6% |
Source: Censuses
