= Želatovice =

- Municipality
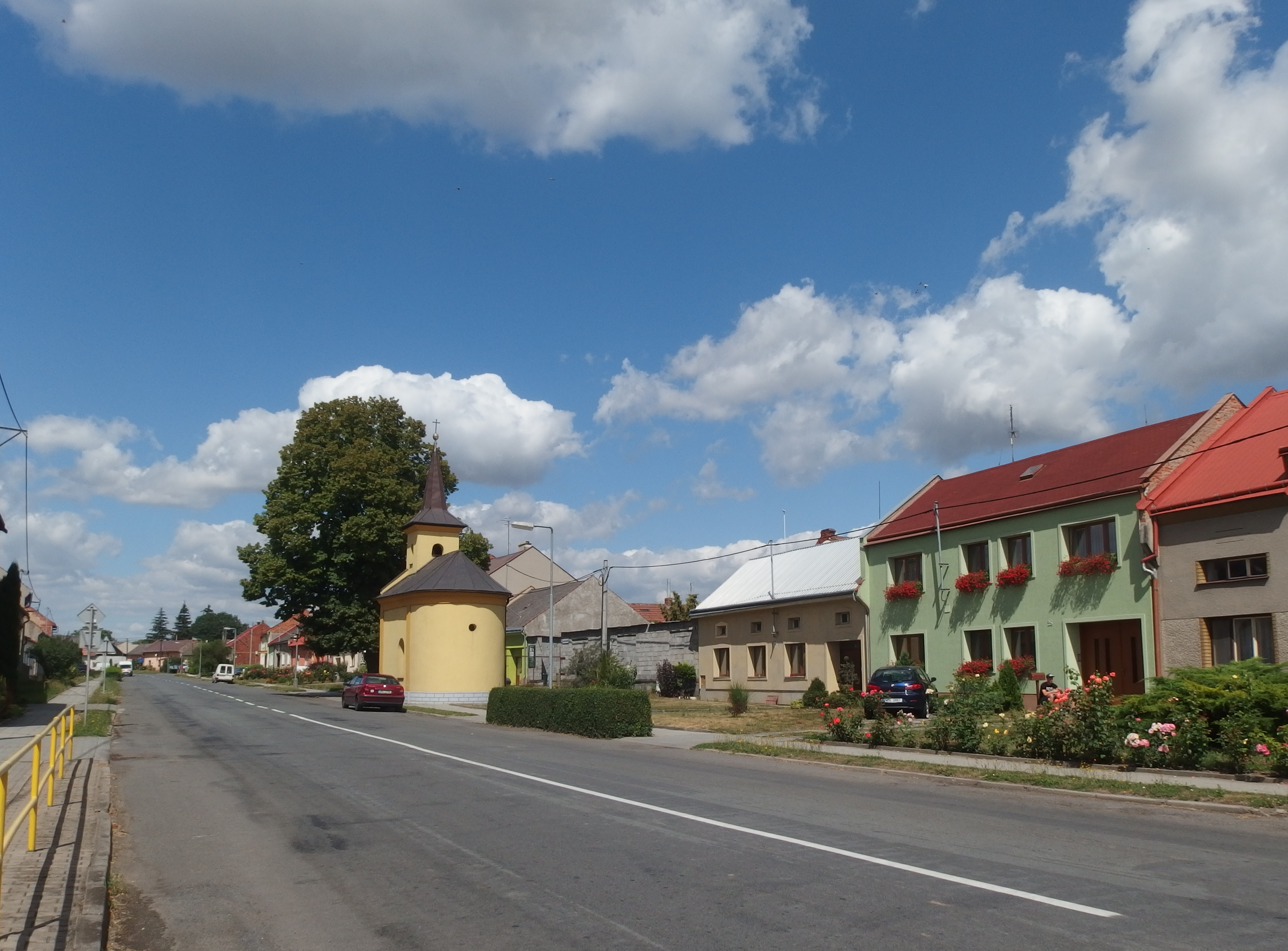
- Centre with Chapel of Saints Peter and Paul

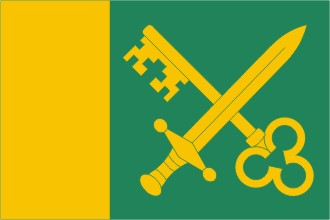
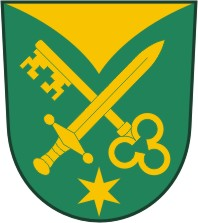
- Flag Coat of arms

- Location in the Czech Republic
- Coordinates: 49°26′39″N 17°30′22″E
- Country: Czech Republic
- Region: Olomouc
- District: Přerov
- First mentioned: 1282

Area
  - Total: 4.42 km^{2} (1.71 sq mi)
- Elevation: 226 m (741 ft)

Population (2026-01-01)
  - Total: 532
  - Density: 120/km^{2} (312/sq mi)
- Time zone: UTC+1 (CET)
  - Summer (DST): UTC+2 (CEST)
- Postal code: 751 16
- Website: www.zelatovice.cz

Želatovice is a municipality and village in Přerov District in the Olomouc Region of the Czech Republic. It has about 500 inhabitants.

Želatovice lies approximately 4 kilometres (2 mi) east of Přerov, 25 km (16 mi) south-east of Olomouc, and 233 km (145 mi) east of Prague.

== History ==
The first written mention of Želatovice is from 1282.

== Demographics ==
Historical population
Year	Pop.	±%
1869	475	—
1880	540	+13.7%
1890	546	+1.1%
1900	595	+9.0%
1910	675	+13.4%
1921	610	−9.6%
1930	604	−1.0%
1950	547	−9.4%
1961	601	+9.9%
1970	564	−6.2%
1980	530	−6.0%
1991	517	−2.5%
2001	519	+0.4%
2011	546	+5.2%
2021	522	−4.4%
Source: Censuses
