= Radíkov =

- Municipality
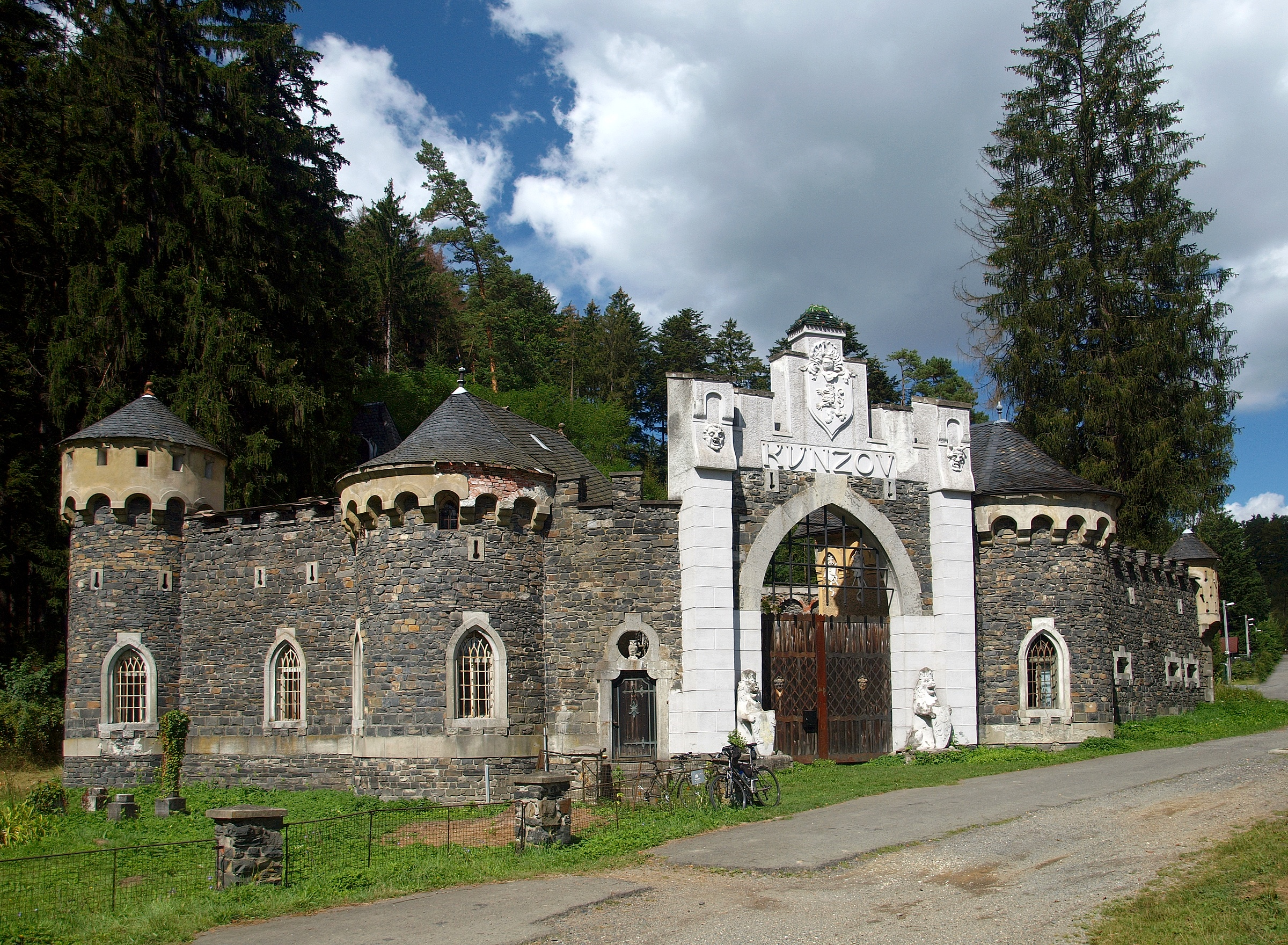
- Kunzov Castle

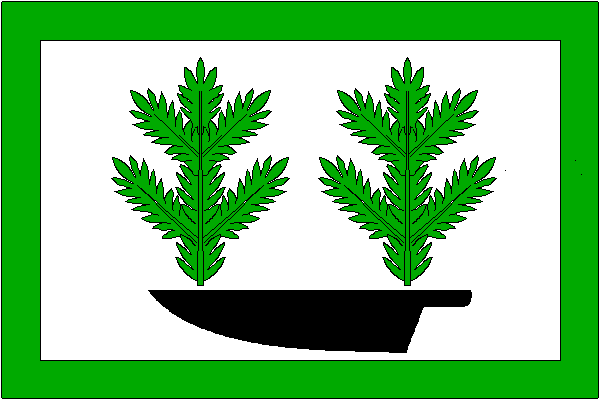
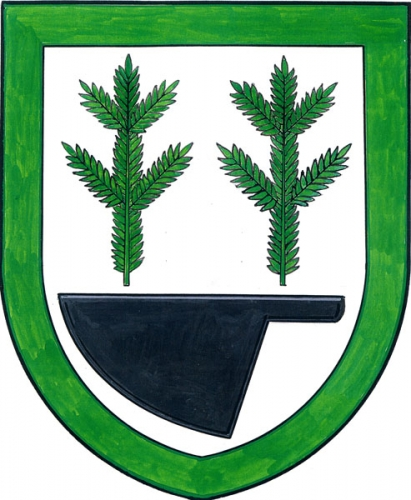
- Flag Coat of arms

- Location in the Czech Republic
- Coordinates: 49°35′46″N 17°40′20″E
- Country: Czech Republic
- Region: Olomouc
- District: Přerov
- First mentioned: 1353

Area
  - Total: 7.04 km^{2} (2.72 sq mi)
- Elevation: 506 m (1,660 ft)

Population (2026-01-01)
  - Total: 160
  - Density: 23/km^{2} (59/sq mi)
- Time zone: UTC+1 (CET)
  - Summer (DST): UTC+2 (CEST)
- Postal code: 753 01
- Website: www.obecradikov.cz

Radíkov (German: Radelsdorf) is a municipality and village in Přerov District in the Olomouc Region of the Czech Republic. It has about 200 inhabitants.

Radíkov lies approximately 23 kilometres (14 mi) north-east of Přerov, 31 km (19 mi) east of Olomouc, and 240 km (150 mi) east of Prague.

== Demographics ==
Historical population
Year	Pop.	±%
1869	256	—
1880	267	+4.3%
1890	279	+4.5%
1900	267	−4.3%
1910	279	+4.5%
1921	248	−11.1%
1930	251	+1.2%
1950	175	−30.3%
1961	179	+2.3%
1970	151	−15.6%
1980	151	+0.0%
1991	132	−12.6%
2001	142	+7.6%
2011	161	+13.4%
2021	158	−1.9%
Source: Censuses
