= Dolní Těšice =

- Municipality
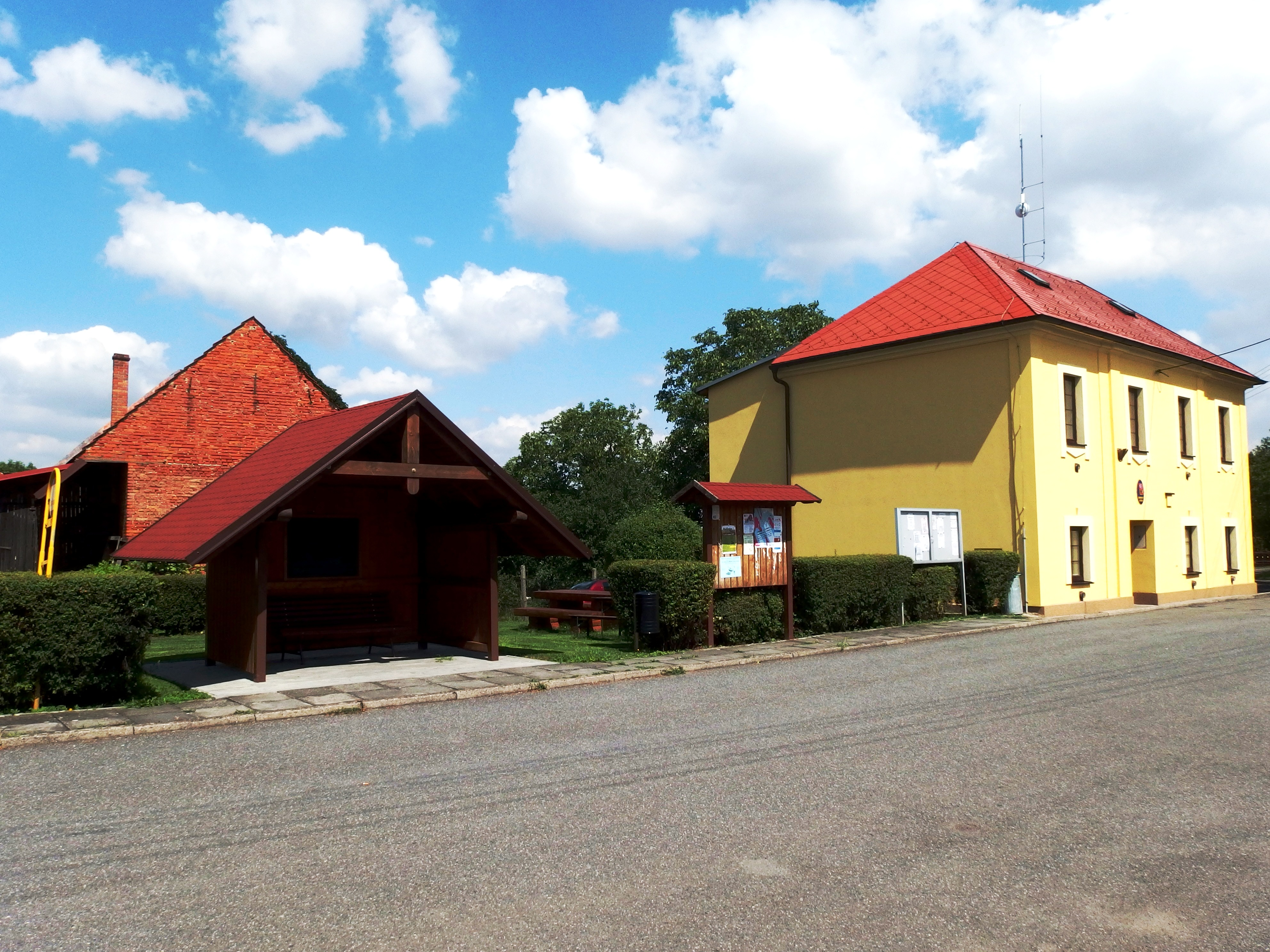
- Bus stop and the municipal office

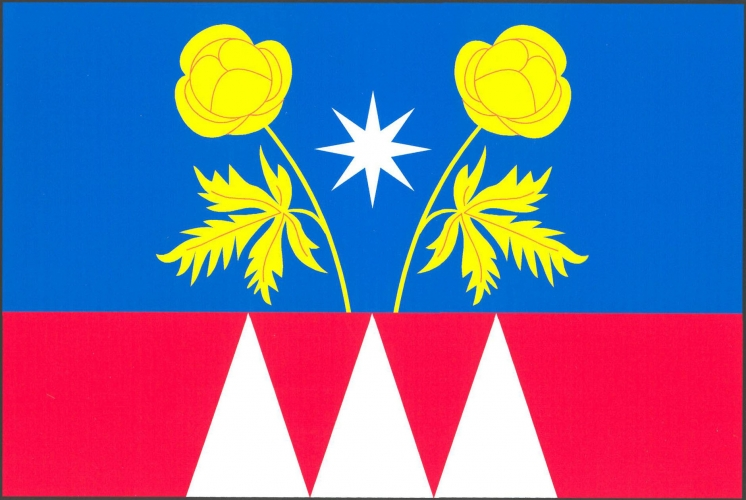
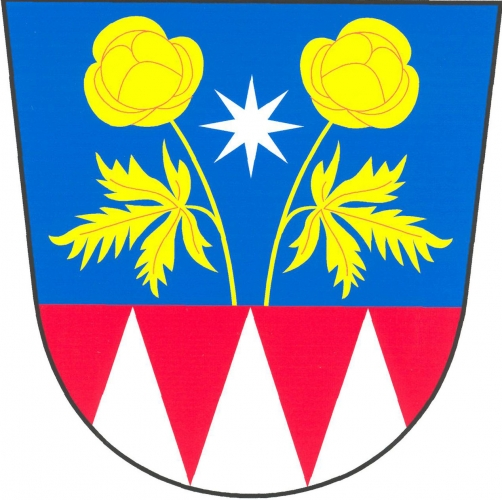
- Flag Coat of arms

- Location in the Czech Republic
- Coordinates: 49°29′43″N 17°48′25″E
- Country: Czech Republic
- Region: Olomouc
- District: Přerov
- First mentioned: 1141

Area
  - Total: 2.56 km^{2} (0.99 sq mi)
- Elevation: 332 m (1,089 ft)

Population (2026-01-01)
  - Total: 66
  - Density: 26/km^{2} (67/sq mi)
- Time zone: UTC+1 (CET)
  - Summer (DST): UTC+2 (CEST)
- Postal code: 753 53
- Website: www.dolnitesice.cz

Dolní Těšice is a municipality and village in Přerov District in the Olomouc Region of the Czech Republic. It has about 70 inhabitants.

Dolní Těšice lies approximately 27 kilometres (17 mi) east of Přerov, 42 km (26 mi) east of Olomouc, and 253 km (157 mi) east of Prague.

== Demographics ==
Historical population
Year	Pop.	±%
1869	135	—
1880	125	−7.4%
1890	106	−15.2%
1900	119	+12.3%
1910	124	+4.2%
1921	119	−4.0%
1930	107	−10.1%
1950	94	−12.1%
1961	81	−13.8%
1970	68	−16.0%
1980	50	−26.5%
1991	40	−20.0%
2001	40	+0.0%
2011	60	+50.0%
2021	70	+16.7%
Source: Censuses
