= Císařov =

- Municipality
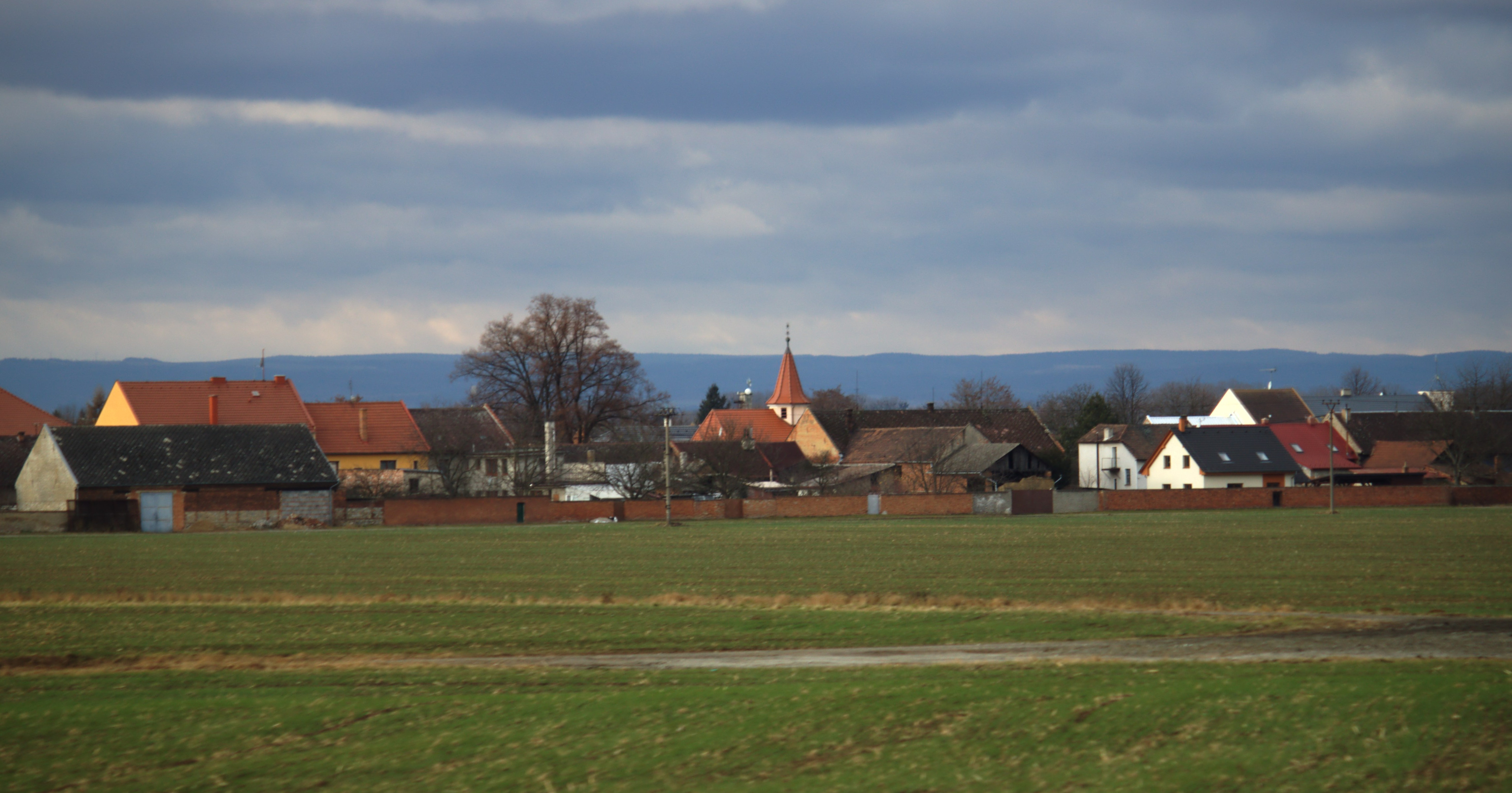
- View from the east

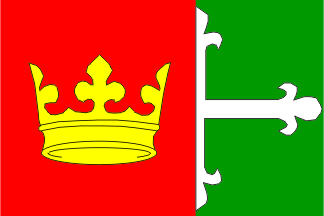
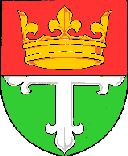
- Flag Coat of arms

- Location in the Czech Republic
- Coordinates: 49°27′58″N 17°21′9″E
- Country: Czech Republic
- Region: Olomouc
- District: Přerov
- Founded: 1785

Area
  - Total: 2.99 km^{2} (1.15 sq mi)
- Elevation: 201 m (659 ft)

Population (2026-01-01)
  - Total: 319
  - Density: 107/km^{2} (276/sq mi)
- Time zone: UTC+1 (CET)
  - Summer (DST): UTC+2 (CEST)
- Postal code: 751 03
- Website: www.cisarov.cz

Císařov (German: Kaiserswerth) is a municipality and village in Přerov District in the Olomouc Region of the Czech Republic. It has about 300 inhabitants.

Císařov lies approximately 8 kilometres (5 mi) west of Přerov, 16 km (10 mi) south-east of Olomouc, and 222 km (138 mi) east of Prague.

== Demographics ==
Historical population
Year	Pop.	±%
1869	364	—
1880	343	−5.8%
1890	358	+4.4%
1900	361	+0.8%
1910	399	+10.5%
1921	434	+8.8%
1930	454	+4.6%
1950	388	−14.5%
1961	373	−3.9%
1970	366	−1.9%
1980	340	−7.1%
1991	277	−18.5%
2001	295	+6.5%
2011	301	+2.0%
2021	290	−3.7%
Source: Censuses
