= Nelešovice =

- Municipality
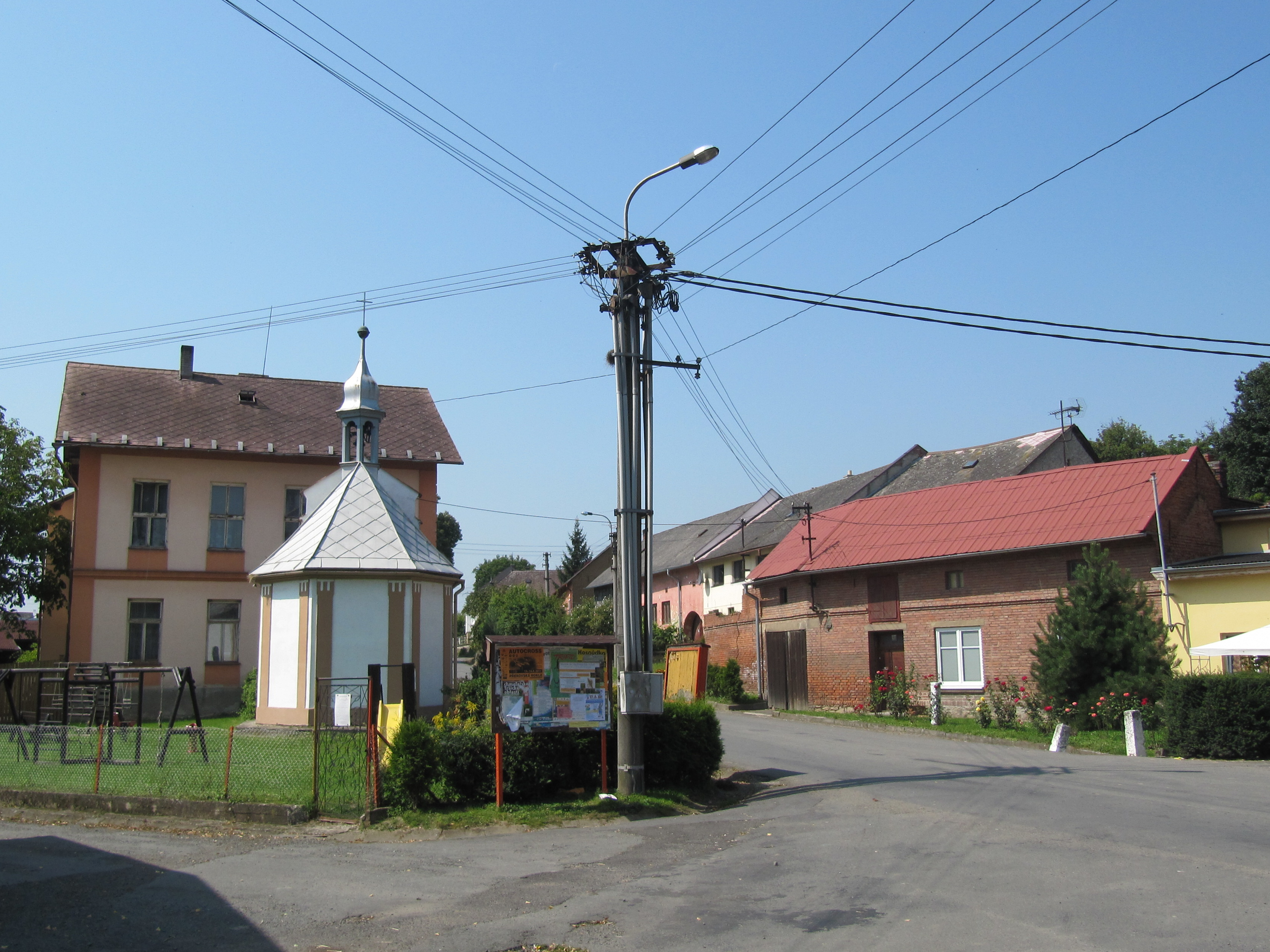
- Centre of Nelešovice with the Chapel of Saints Roch, Sebastian, Fabian and Rosalia

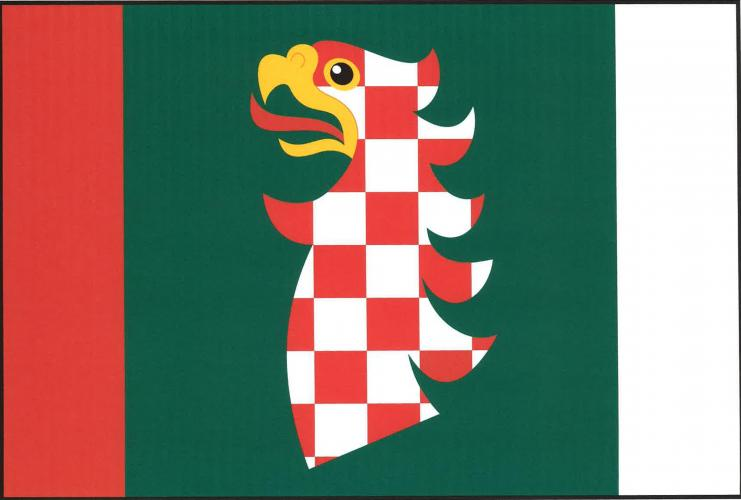
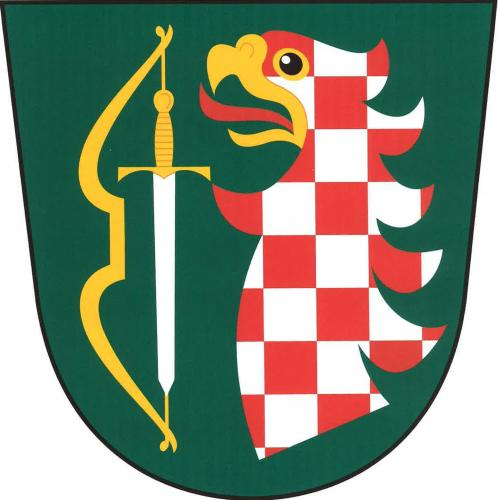
- Flag Coat of arms

- Location in the Czech Republic
- Coordinates: 49°30′39″N 17°23′17″E
- Country: Czech Republic
- Region: Olomouc
- District: Přerov
- First mentioned: 1234

Area
  - Total: 3.16 km^{2} (1.22 sq mi)
- Elevation: 248 m (814 ft)

Population (2026-01-01)
  - Total: 192
  - Density: 60.8/km^{2} (157/sq mi)
- Time zone: UTC+1 (CET)
  - Summer (DST): UTC+2 (CEST)
- Postal code: 751 03
- Website: www.nelesovice.cz

Nelešovice is a municipality and village in Přerov District in the Olomouc Region of the Czech Republic. It has about 200 inhabitants.

Nelešovice lies approximately 8 kilometres (5 mi) north-west of Přerov, 14 km (9 mi) south-east of Olomouc, and 223 km (139 mi) east of Prague.

== Demographics ==
Historical population
Year	Pop.	±%
1869	251	—
1880	237	−5.6%
1890	260	+9.7%
1900	264	+1.5%
1910	290	+9.8%
1921	302	+4.1%
1930	305	+1.0%
1950	241	−21.0%
1961	258	+7.1%
1970	229	−11.2%
1980	220	−3.9%
1991	191	−13.2%
2001	205	+7.3%
2011	201	−2.0%
2021	198	−1.5%
Source: Censuses
