= Horní Těšice =

- Municipality
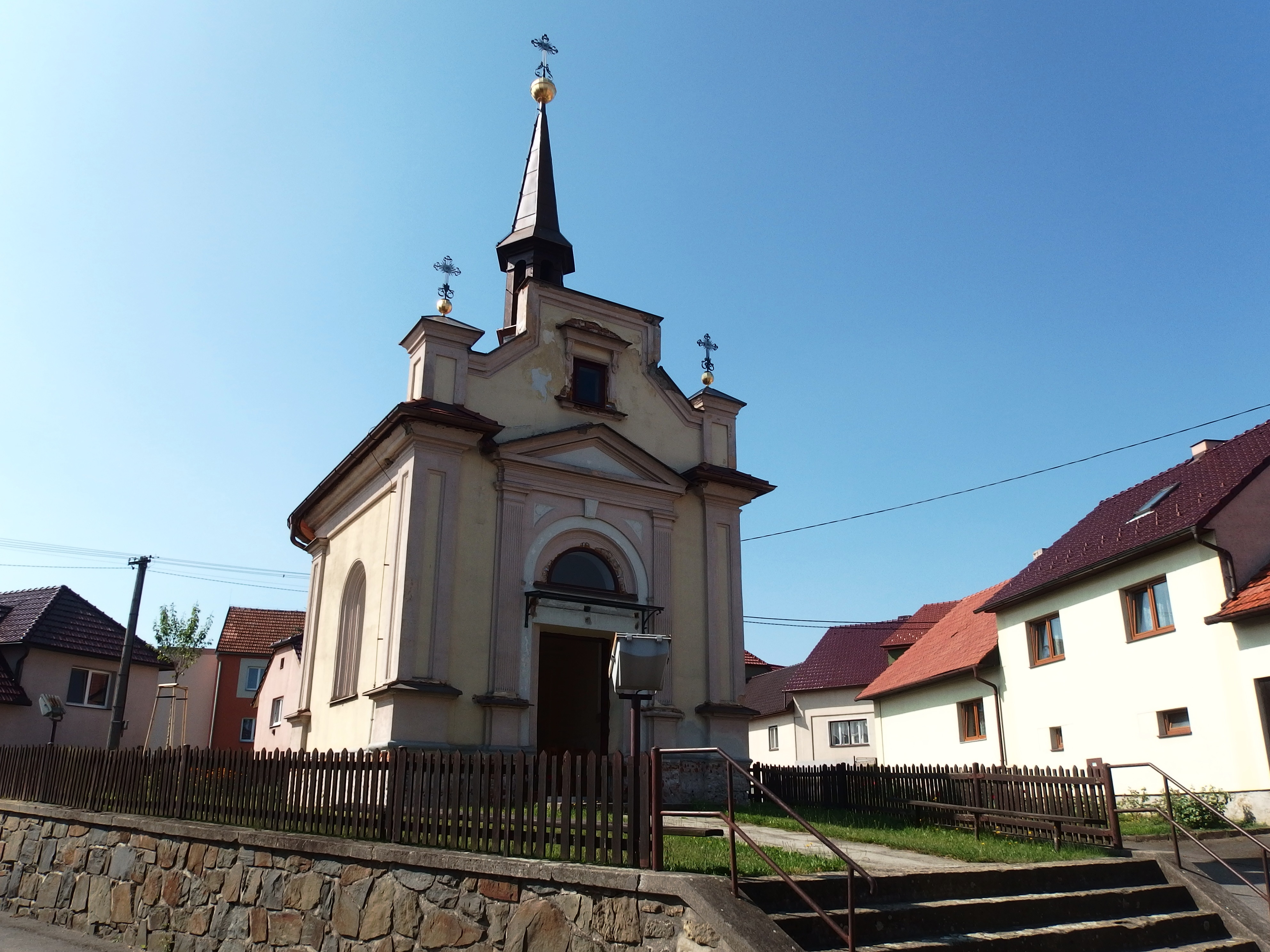
- Chapel of the Virgin Mary

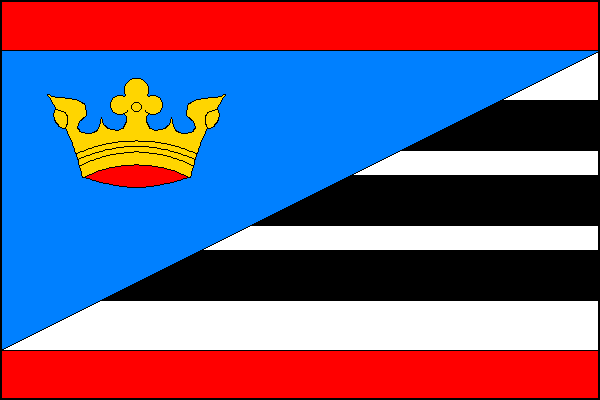
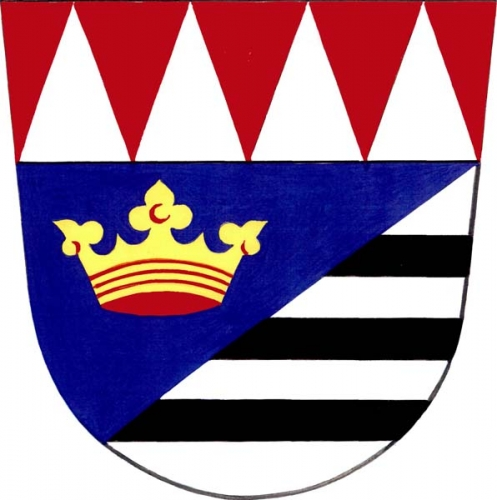
- Flag Coat of arms

- Location in the Czech Republic
- Coordinates: 49°29′44″N 17°47′10″E
- Country: Czech Republic
- Region: Olomouc
- District: Přerov
- First mentioned: 1141

Area
  - Total: 3.22 km^{2} (1.24 sq mi)
- Elevation: 341 m (1,119 ft)

Population (2026-01-01)
  - Total: 159
  - Density: 49.4/km^{2} (128/sq mi)
- Time zone: UTC+1 (CET)
  - Summer (DST): UTC+2 (CEST)
- Postal code: 753 53
- Website: www.hornitesice.cz

Horní Těšice is a municipality and village in Přerov District in the Olomouc Region of the Czech Republic. It has about 200 inhabitants.

Horní Těšice lies approximately 25 kilometres (16 mi) east of Přerov, 40 km (25 mi) east of Olomouc, and 251 km (156 mi) east of Prague.

== Demographics ==
Historical population
Year	Pop.	±%
1869	125	—
1880	138	+10.4%
1890	120	−13.0%
1900	149	+24.2%
1910	151	+1.3%
1921	138	−8.6%
1930	152	+10.1%
1950	130	−14.5%
1961	157	+20.8%
1970	157	+0.0%
1980	156	−0.6%
1991	159	+1.9%
2001	166	+4.4%
2011	148	−10.8%
2021	139	−6.1%
Source: Censuses
