= Milenov =

- Municipality
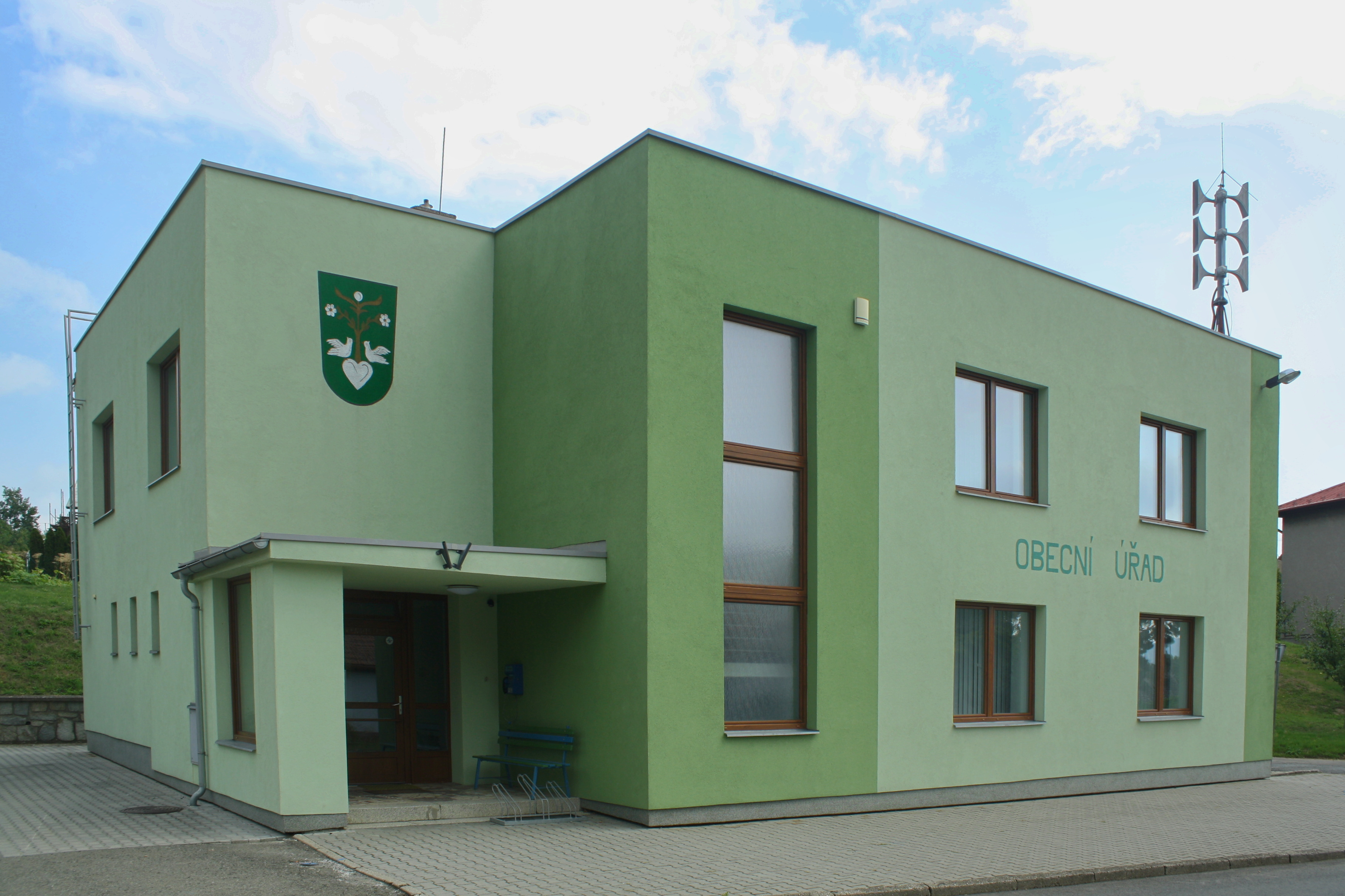
- Municipal office

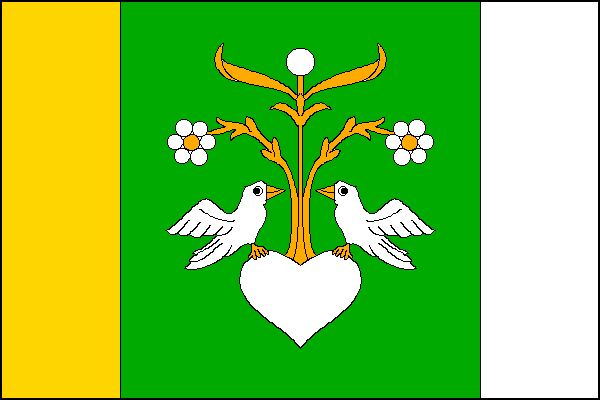
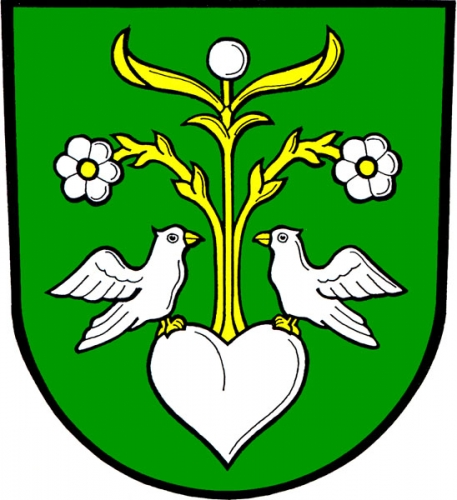
- Flag Coat of arms

- Location in the Czech Republic
- Coordinates: 49°33′45″N 17°40′1″E
- Country: Czech Republic
- Region: Olomouc
- District: Přerov
- First mentioned: 1353

Area
  - Total: 6.23 km^{2} (2.41 sq mi)
- Elevation: 282 m (925 ft)

Population (2026-01-01)
  - Total: 430
  - Density: 69/km^{2} (180/sq mi)
- Time zone: UTC+1 (CET)
  - Summer (DST): UTC+2 (CEST)
- Postal code: 753 61
- Website: www.milenov.cz

Milenov is a municipality and village in Přerov District in the Olomouc Region of the Czech Republic. It has about 400 inhabitants.

Milenov lies approximately 20 kilometres (12 mi) north-east of Přerov, 31 km (19 mi) east of Olomouc, and 240 km (150 mi) east of Prague.

== Demographics ==
Historical population
Year	Pop.	±%
1869	432	—
1880	443	+2.5%
1890	438	−1.1%
1900	483	+10.3%
1910	524	+8.5%
1921	520	−0.8%
1930	564	+8.5%
1950	521	−7.6%
1961	539	+3.5%
1970	454	−15.8%
1980	396	−12.8%
1991	386	−2.5%
2001	373	−3.4%
2011	417	+11.8%
2021	413	−1.0%
Source: Censuses
