= Oprostovice =

- Municipality
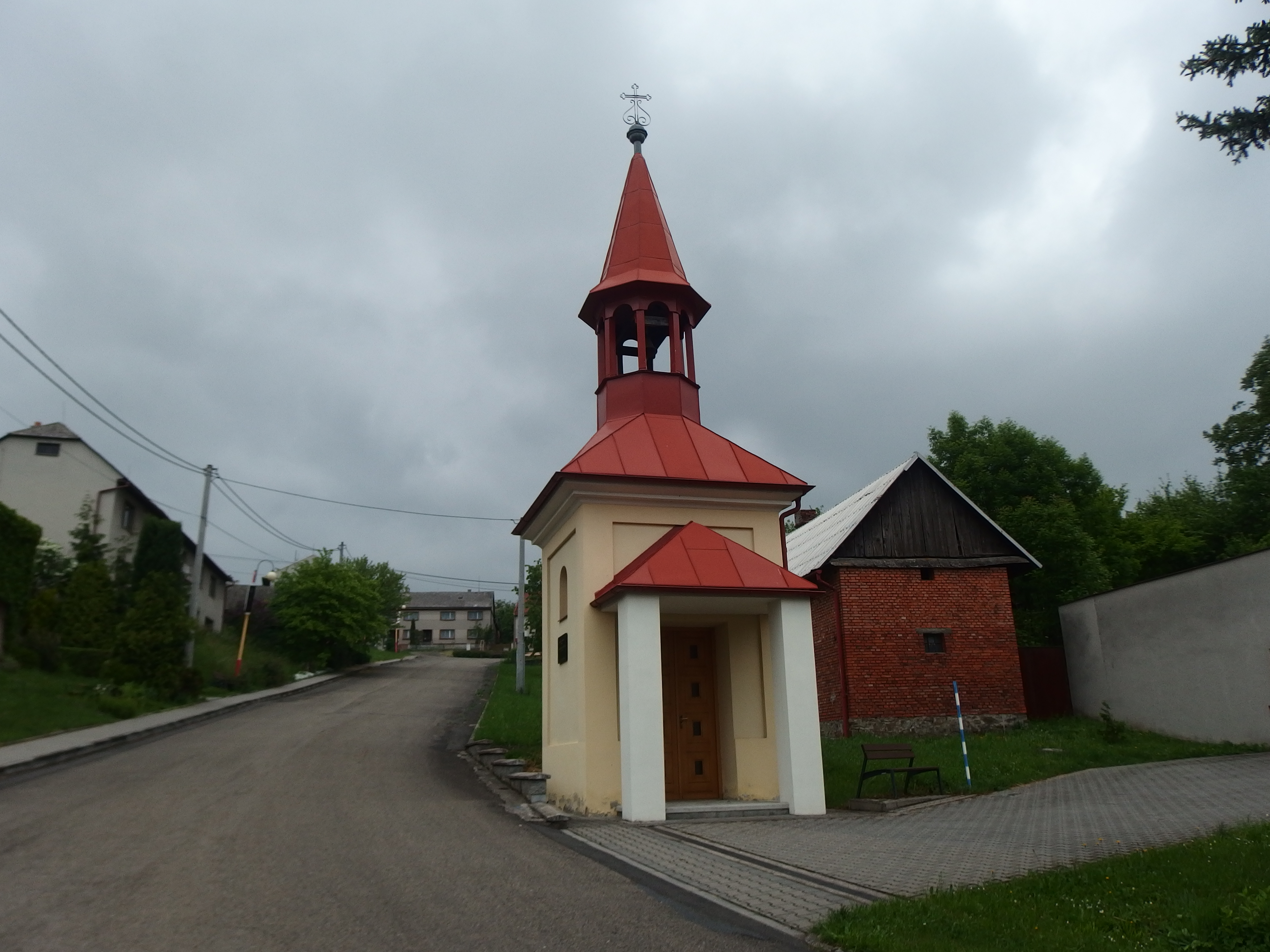
- Chapel of the Virgin Mary

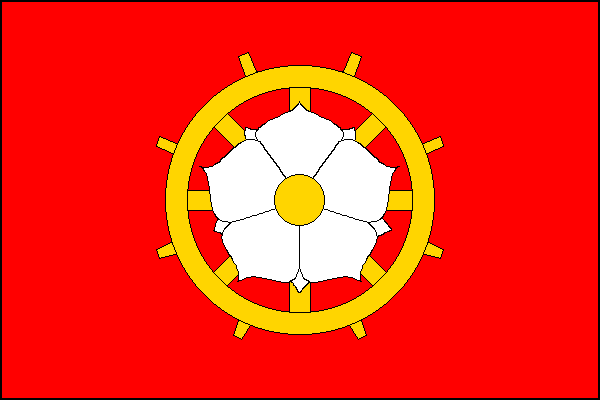
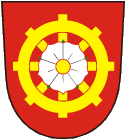
- Flag Coat of arms

- Location in the Czech Republic
- Coordinates: 49°28′11″N 17°37′13″E
- Country: Czech Republic
- Region: Olomouc
- District: Přerov
- First mentioned: 1368

Area
  - Total: 2.67 km^{2} (1.03 sq mi)
- Elevation: 300 m (980 ft)

Population (2026-01-01)
  - Total: 81
  - Density: 30/km^{2} (79/sq mi)
- Time zone: UTC+1 (CET)
  - Summer (DST): UTC+2 (CEST)
- Postal code: 753 54
- Website: www.oprostovice.cz

Oprostovice is a municipality and village in Přerov District in the Olomouc Region of the Czech Republic. It has about 80 inhabitants.

Oprostovice lies approximately 13 kilometres (8 mi) east of Přerov, 30 km (19 mi) south-east of Olomouc, and 240 km (150 mi) east of Prague.

== Demographics ==
Historical population
Year	Pop.	±%
1869	167	—
1880	171	+2.4%
1890	157	−8.2%
1900	162	+3.2%
1910	162	+0.0%
1921	172	+6.2%
1930	174	+1.2%
1950	153	−12.1%
1961	143	−6.5%
1970	126	−11.9%
1980	116	−7.9%
1991	105	−9.5%
2001	115	+9.5%
2011	93	−19.1%
2021	85	−8.6%
Source: Censuses
