= Nahošovice =

- Municipality
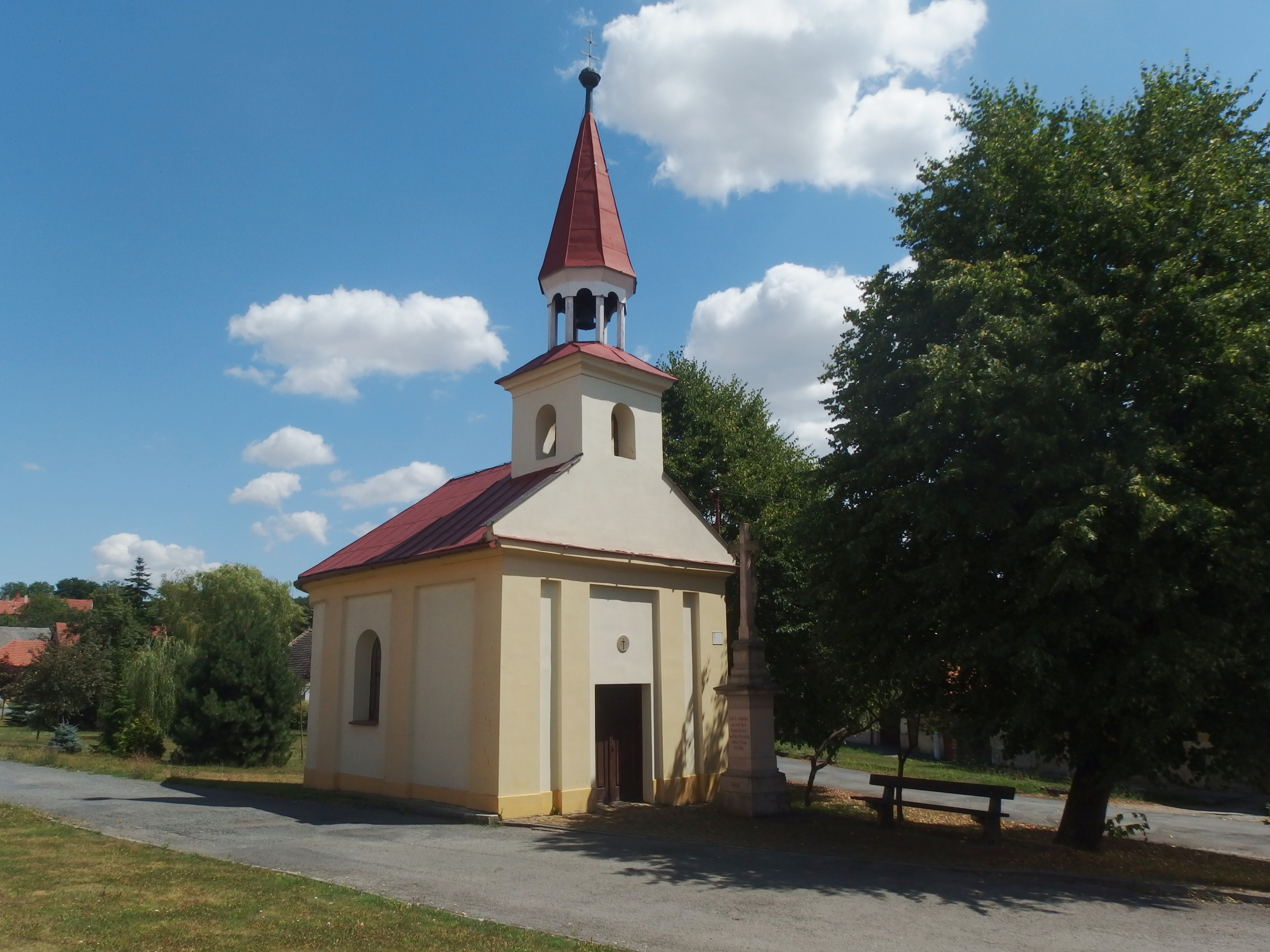
- Chapel of the Holy Trinity

- Flag Coat of arms

- Location in the Czech Republic
- Coordinates: 49°26′16″N 17°34′41″E
- Country: Czech Republic
- Region: Olomouc
- District: Přerov
- First mentioned: 1365

Area
  - Total: 2.93 km^{2} (1.13 sq mi)
- Elevation: 257 m (843 ft)

Population (2026-01-01)
  - Total: 167
  - Density: 57.0/km^{2} (148/sq mi)
- Time zone: UTC+1 (CET)
  - Summer (DST): UTC+2 (CEST)
- Postal code: 751 14
- Website: www.nahosovice.cz

Nahošovice is a municipality and village in Přerov District in the Olomouc Region of the Czech Republic. It has about 200 inhabitants.

Nahošovice lies approximately 10 kilometres (6 mi) east of Přerov, 30 km (19 mi) south-east of Olomouc, and 239 km (149 mi) east of Prague.

== Demographics ==
Historical population
Year	Pop.	±%
1869	219	—
1880	279	+27.4%
1890	273	−2.2%
1900	259	−5.1%
1910	295	+13.9%
1921	321	+8.8%
1930	298	−7.2%
1950	253	−15.1%
1961	271	+7.1%
1970	247	−8.9%
1980	240	−2.8%
1991	183	−23.8%
2001	181	−1.1%
2011	160	−11.6%
2021	151	−5.6%
Source: Censuses
