= Soběchleby =

- Municipality
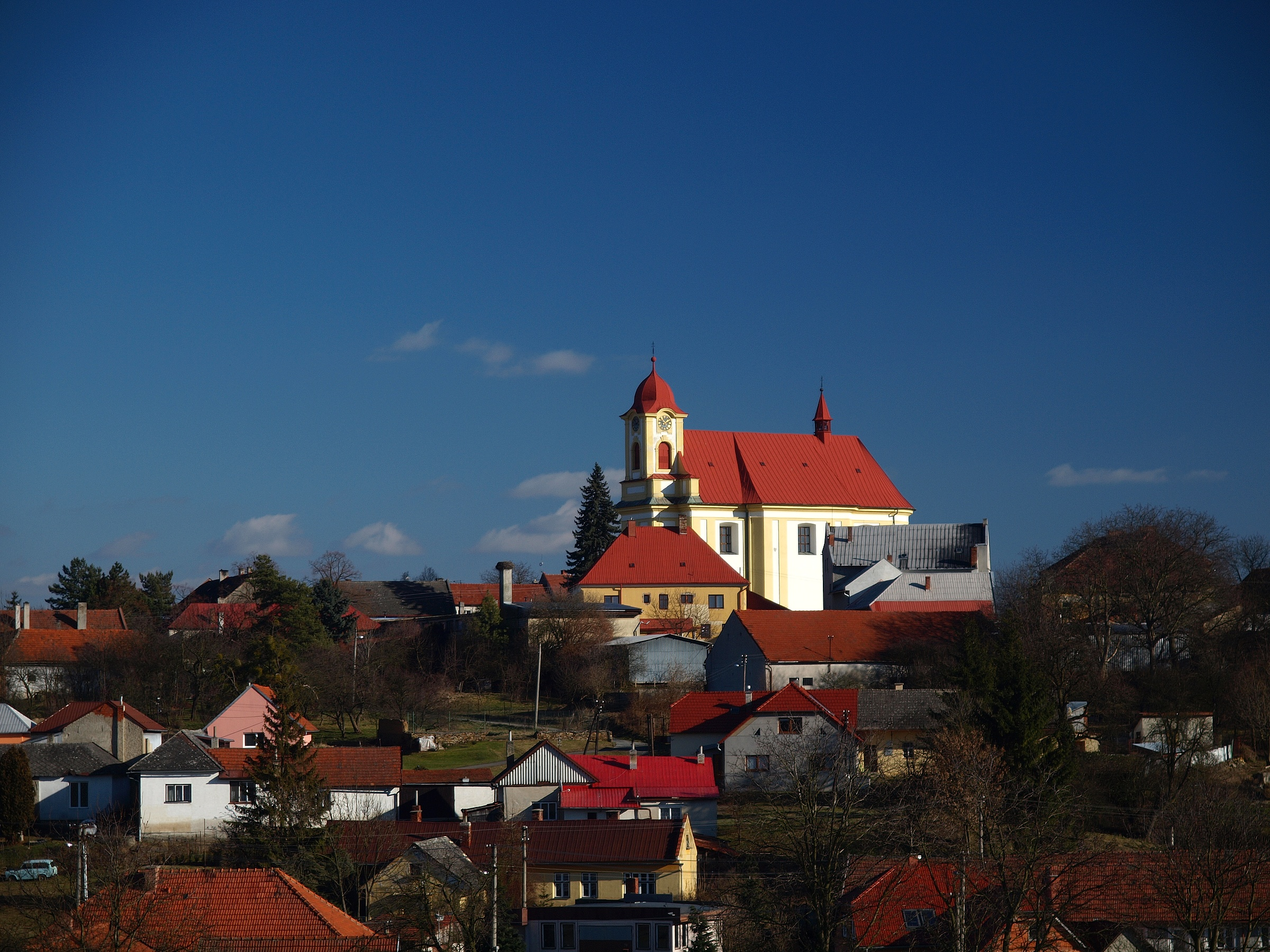
- Church of the Assumption of the Virgin Mary

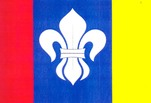
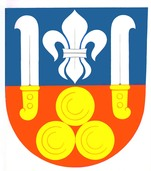
- Flag Coat of arms

- Location in the Czech Republic
- Coordinates: 49°28′44″N 17°39′6″E
- Country: Czech Republic
- Region: Olomouc
- District: Přerov
- First mentioned: 1368

Area
  - Total: 6.64 km^{2} (2.56 sq mi)
- Elevation: 284 m (932 ft)

Population (2026-01-01)
  - Total: 594
  - Density: 89.5/km^{2} (232/sq mi)
- Time zone: UTC+1 (CET)
  - Summer (DST): UTC+2 (CEST)
- Postal code: 753 54
- Website: www.sobechleby.cz

Soběchleby is a municipality and village in Přerov District in the Olomouc Region of the Czech Republic. It has about 600 inhabitants.

Soběchleby lies approximately 15 kilometres (9 mi) east of Přerov, 32 km (20 mi) south-east of Olomouc, and 242 km (150 mi) east of Prague.

== Demographics ==
Historical population
Year	Pop.	±%
1869	555	—
1880	600	+8.1%
1890	571	−4.8%
1900	566	−0.9%
1910	648	+14.5%
1921	634	−2.2%
1930	631	−0.5%
1950	615	−2.5%
1961	633	+2.9%
1970	595	−6.0%
1980	571	−4.0%
1991	578	+1.2%
2001	617	+6.7%
2011	609	−1.3%
2021	572	−6.1%
Source: Censuses
