= Lazníčky =

- Municipality
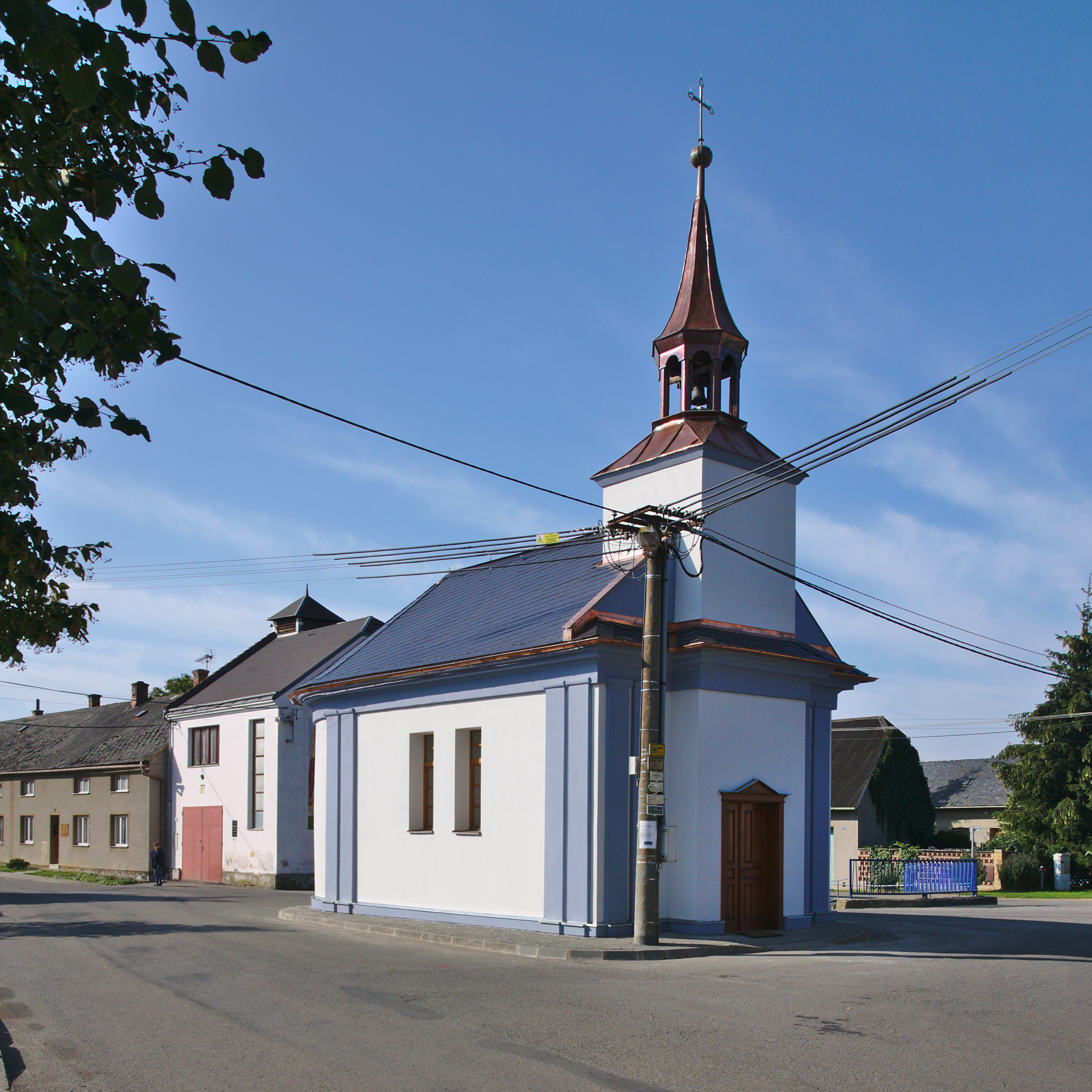
- Chapel of the Beheading of Saint John the Baptist

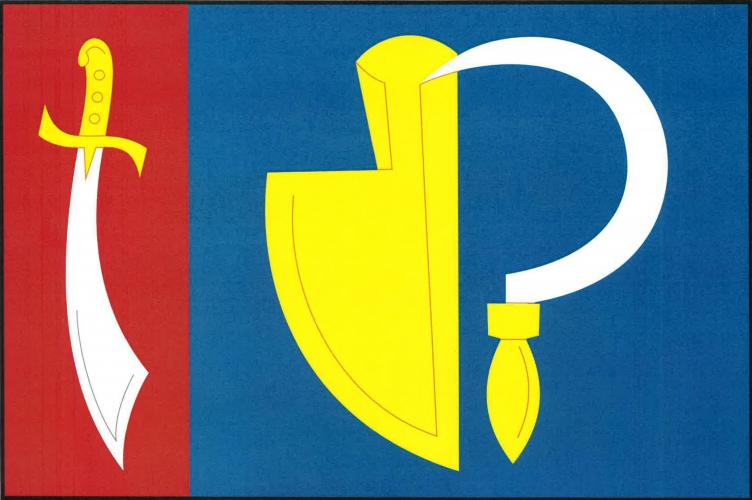
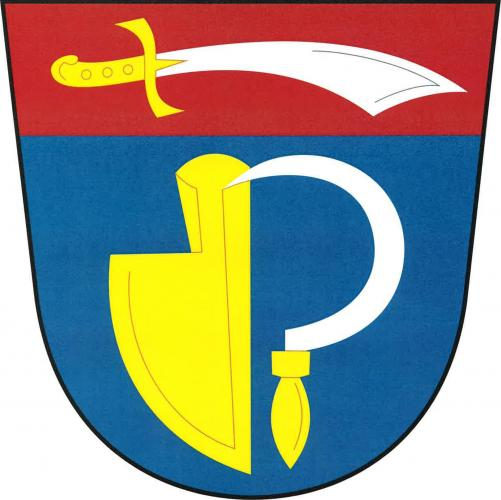
- Flag Coat of arms

- Location in the Czech Republic
- Coordinates: 49°32′44″N 17°27′36″E
- Country: Czech Republic
- Region: Olomouc
- District: Přerov
- First mentioned: 1365

Area
  - Total: 2.93 km^{2} (1.13 sq mi)
- Elevation: 310 m (1,020 ft)

Population (2026-01-01)
  - Total: 182
  - Density: 62.1/km^{2} (161/sq mi)
- Time zone: UTC+1 (CET)
  - Summer (DST): UTC+2 (CEST)
- Postal code: 751 25
- Website: www.laznicky.cz

Lazníčky is a municipality and village in Přerov District in the Olomouc Region of the Czech Republic. It has about 200 inhabitants.

Lazníčky lies approximately 11 kilometres (7 mi) north of Přerov, 17 km (11 mi) east of Olomouc, and 227 km (141 mi) east of Prague.

== Demographics ==
Historical population
Year	Pop.	±%
1869	329	—
1880	315	−4.3%
1890	319	+1.3%
1900	312	−2.2%
1910	303	−2.9%
1921	306	+1.0%
1930	330	+7.8%
1950	253	−23.3%
1961	241	−4.7%
1970	234	−2.9%
1980	213	−9.0%
1991	182	−14.6%
2001	177	−2.7%
2011	192	+8.5%
2021	185	−3.6%
Source: Censuses
