= Jindřichov (Přerov District) =

- Municipality
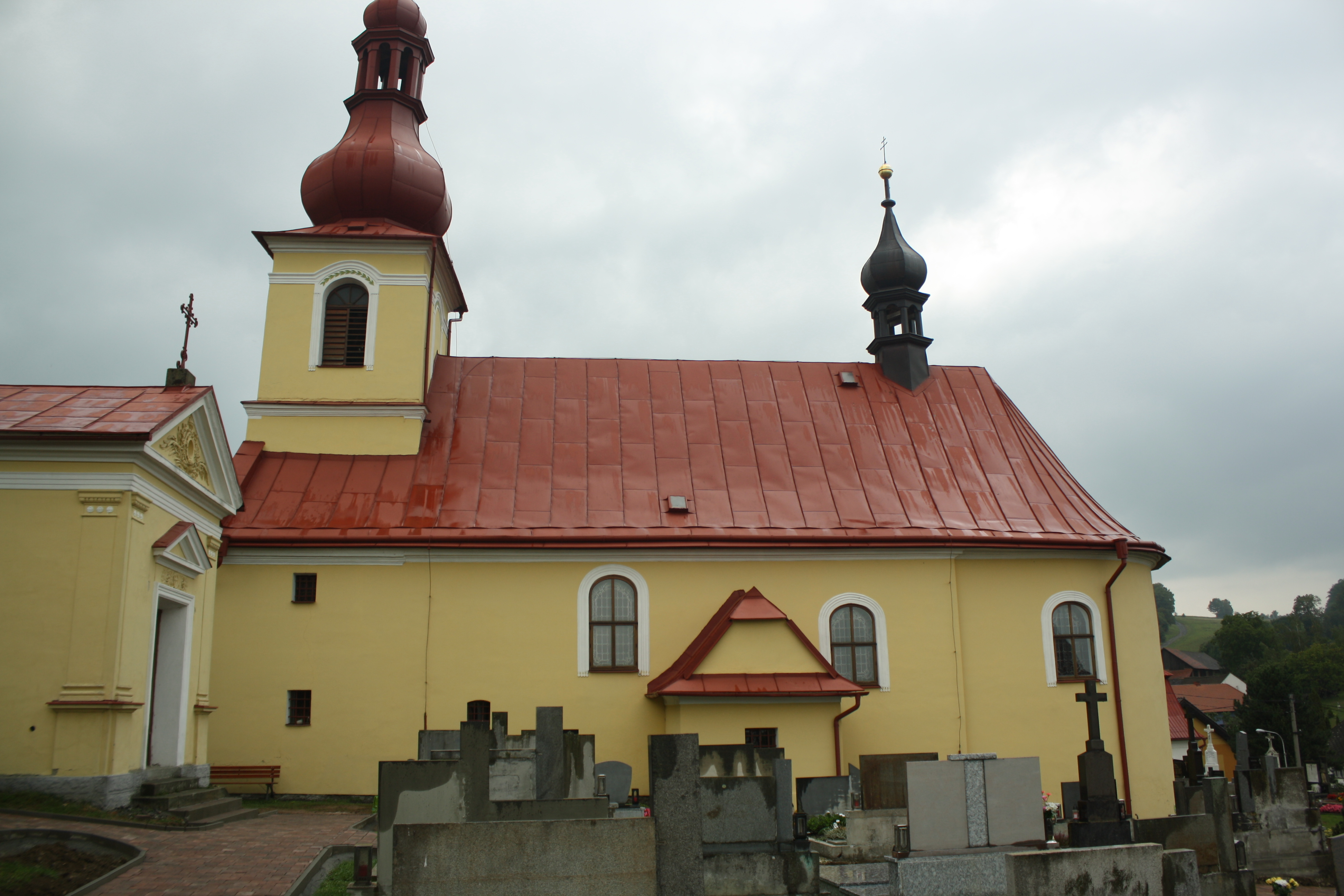
- Church of the Assumption of the Virgin Mary

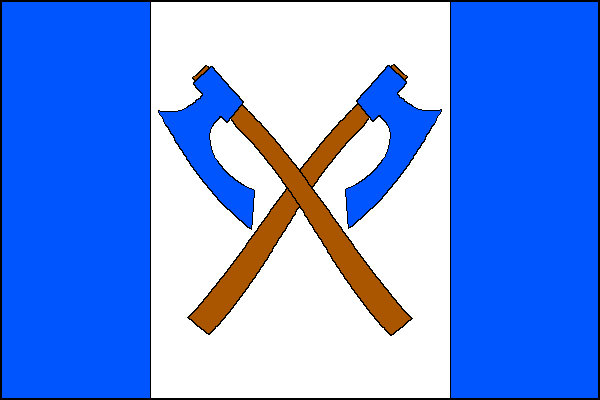
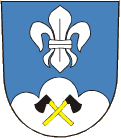
- Flag Coat of arms

- Location in the Czech Republic
- Coordinates: 49°38′41″N 17°44′54″E
- Country: Czech Republic
- Region: Olomouc
- District: Přerov
- First mentioned: 1499

Area
  - Total: 16.46 km^{2} (6.36 sq mi)
- Elevation: 418 m (1,371 ft)

Population (2026-01-01)
  - Total: 491
  - Density: 29.8/km^{2} (77.3/sq mi)
- Time zone: UTC+1 (CET)
  - Summer (DST): UTC+2 (CEST)
- Postal code: 753 01
- Website: www.obec-jindrichov.cz

Jindřichov (German: Heinrichswald) is a municipality and village in Přerov District in the Olomouc Region of the Czech Republic. It has about 500 inhabitants.

Jindřichov lies approximately 31 kilometres (19 mi) north-east of Přerov, 37 km (23 mi) east of Olomouc, and 244 km (152 mi) east of Prague.

== Demographics ==
Historical population
| Year | Pop. | ±% |
|---|---|---|
| 1869 | 632 | — |
| 1880 | 650 | +2.8% |
| 1890 | 661 | +1.7% |
| 1900 | 631 | −4.5% |
| 1910 | 632 | +0.2% |
| 1921 | 652 | +3.2% |
| 1930 | 627 | −3.8% |
| 1950 | 528 | −15.8% |
| 1961 | 515 | −2.5% |
| 1970 | 491 | −4.7% |
| 1980 | 509 | +3.7% |
| 1991 | 498 | −2.2% |
| 2001 | 469 | −5.8% |
| 2011 | 477 | +1.7% |
| 2021 | 458 | −4.0% |
Source: Censuses
