= Křtomil =

- Municipality
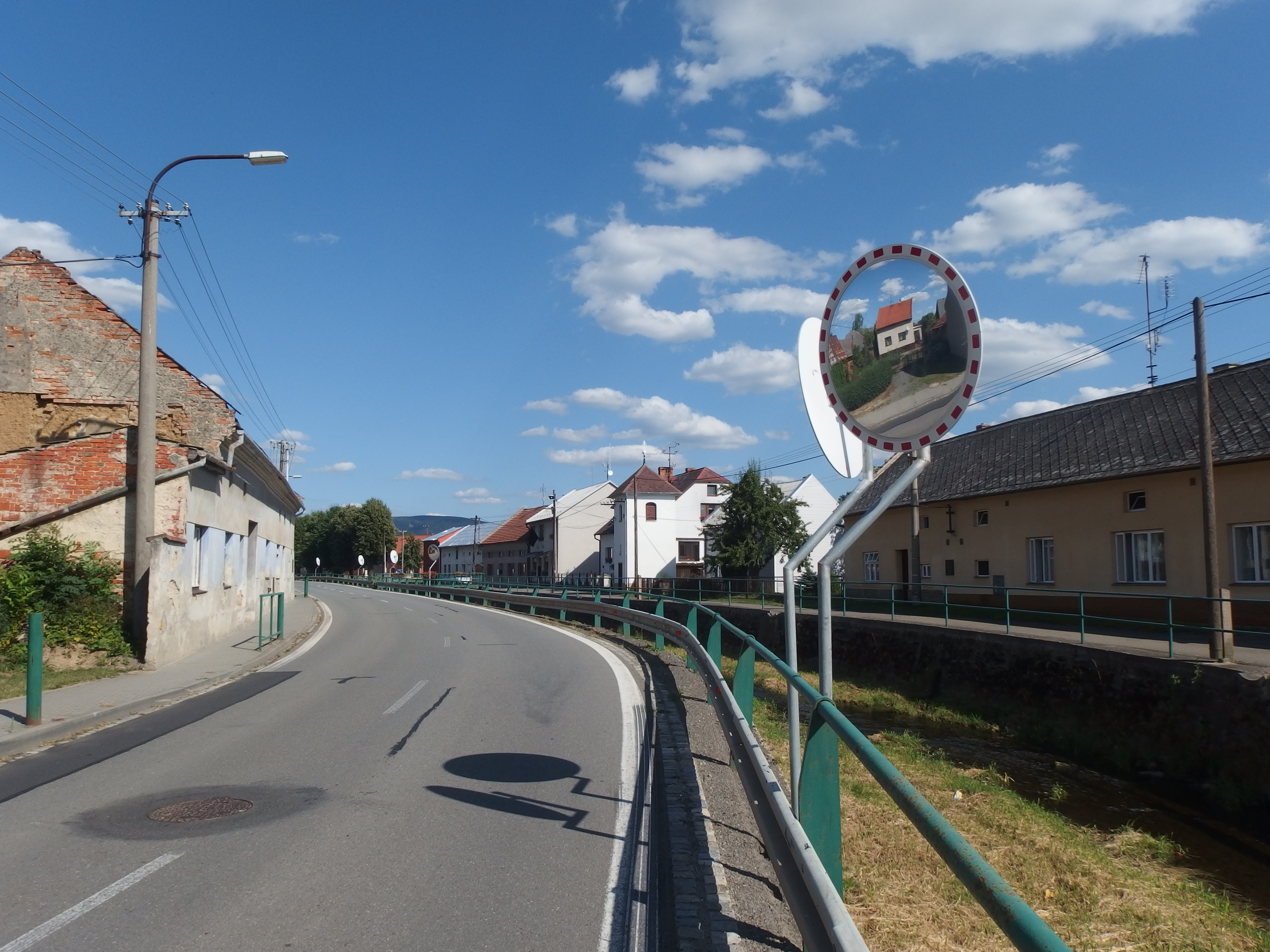
- Main street

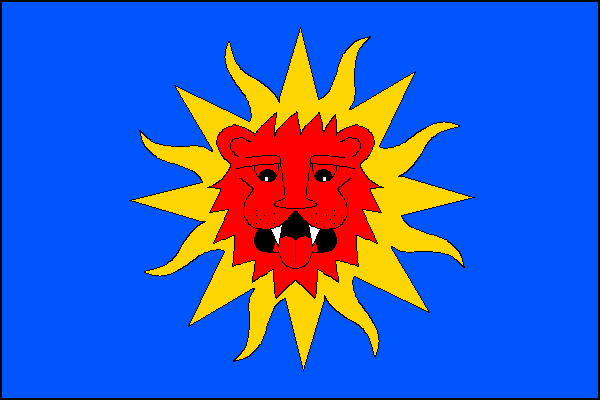
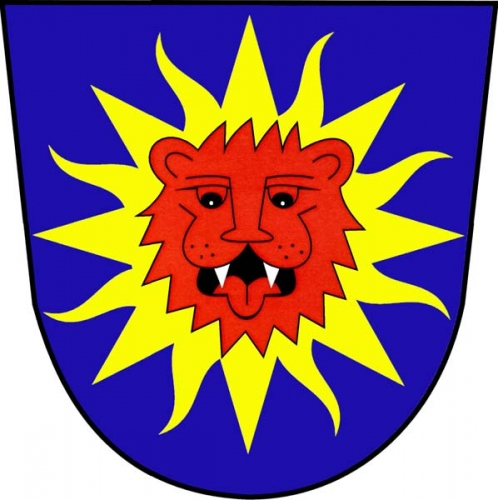
- Flag Coat of arms

- Location in the Czech Republic
- Coordinates: 49°24′33″N 17°37′34″E
- Country: Czech Republic
- Region: Olomouc
- District: Přerov
- First mentioned: 1365

Area
  - Total: 4.04 km^{2} (1.56 sq mi)
- Elevation: 265 m (869 ft)

Population (2026-01-01)
  - Total: 406
  - Density: 100/km^{2} (260/sq mi)
- Time zone: UTC+1 (CET)
  - Summer (DST): UTC+2 (CEST)
- Postal code: 751 14
- Website: www.krtomil.cz

Křtomil is a municipality and village in Přerov District in the Olomouc Region of the Czech Republic. It has about 400 inhabitants.

Křtomil lies approximately 14 kilometres (9 mi) east of Přerov, 35 km (22 mi) south-east of Olomouc, and 243 km (151 mi) east of Prague.

== Demographics ==
Historical population
Year	Pop.	±%
1869	310	—
1880	302	−2.6%
1890	362	+19.9%
1900	410	+13.3%
1910	409	−0.2%
1921	451	+10.3%
1930	451	+0.0%
1950	428	−5.1%
1961	470	+9.8%
1970	423	−10.0%
1980	419	−0.9%
1991	431	+2.9%
2001	411	−4.6%
2011	413	+0.5%
2021	412	−0.2%
Source: Censuses
