= Bezuchov =

- Municipality
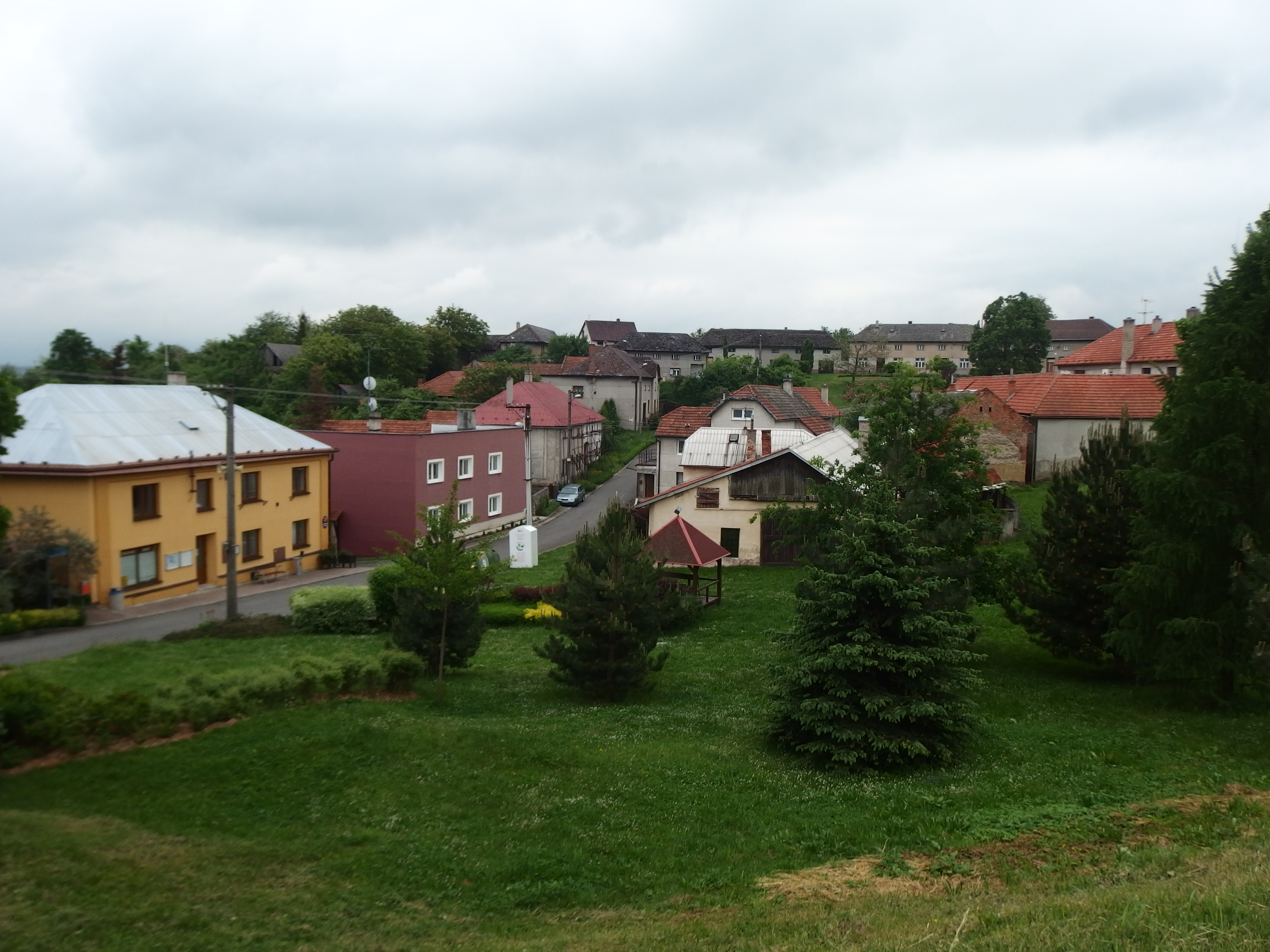
- Centre of Bezuchov with the municipal office (left)

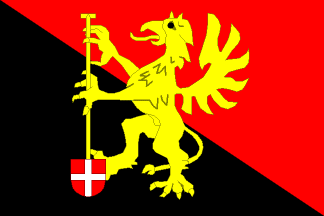
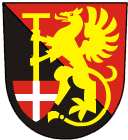
- Flag Coat of arms

- Location in the Czech Republic
- Coordinates: 49°27′46″N 17°36′32″E
- Country: Czech Republic
- Region: Olomouc
- District: Přerov
- First mentioned: 1365

Area
  - Total: 3.96 km^{2} (1.53 sq mi)
- Elevation: 296 m (971 ft)

Population (2026-01-01)
  - Total: 182
  - Density: 46.0/km^{2} (119/sq mi)
- Time zone: UTC+1 (CET)
  - Summer (DST): UTC+2 (CEST)
- Postal code: 753 54
- Website: www.bezuchov.cz

Bezuchov is a municipality and village in Přerov District in the Olomouc Region of the Czech Republic. It has about 200 inhabitants.

Bezuchov lies approximately 12 kilometres (7 mi) east of Přerov, 30 km (19 mi) south-east of Olomouc, and 240 km (150 mi) east of Prague.

== Demographics ==
Historical population
Year	Pop.	±%
1869	260	—
1880	298	+14.6%
1890	312	+4.7%
1900	320	+2.6%
1910	335	+4.7%
1921	354	+5.7%
1930	296	−16.4%
1950	254	−14.2%
1961	255	+0.4%
1970	220	−13.7%
1980	202	−8.2%
1991	189	−6.4%
2001	173	−8.5%
2011	189	+9.2%
2021	169	−10.6%
Source: Censuses
