= Býškovice =

- Municipality
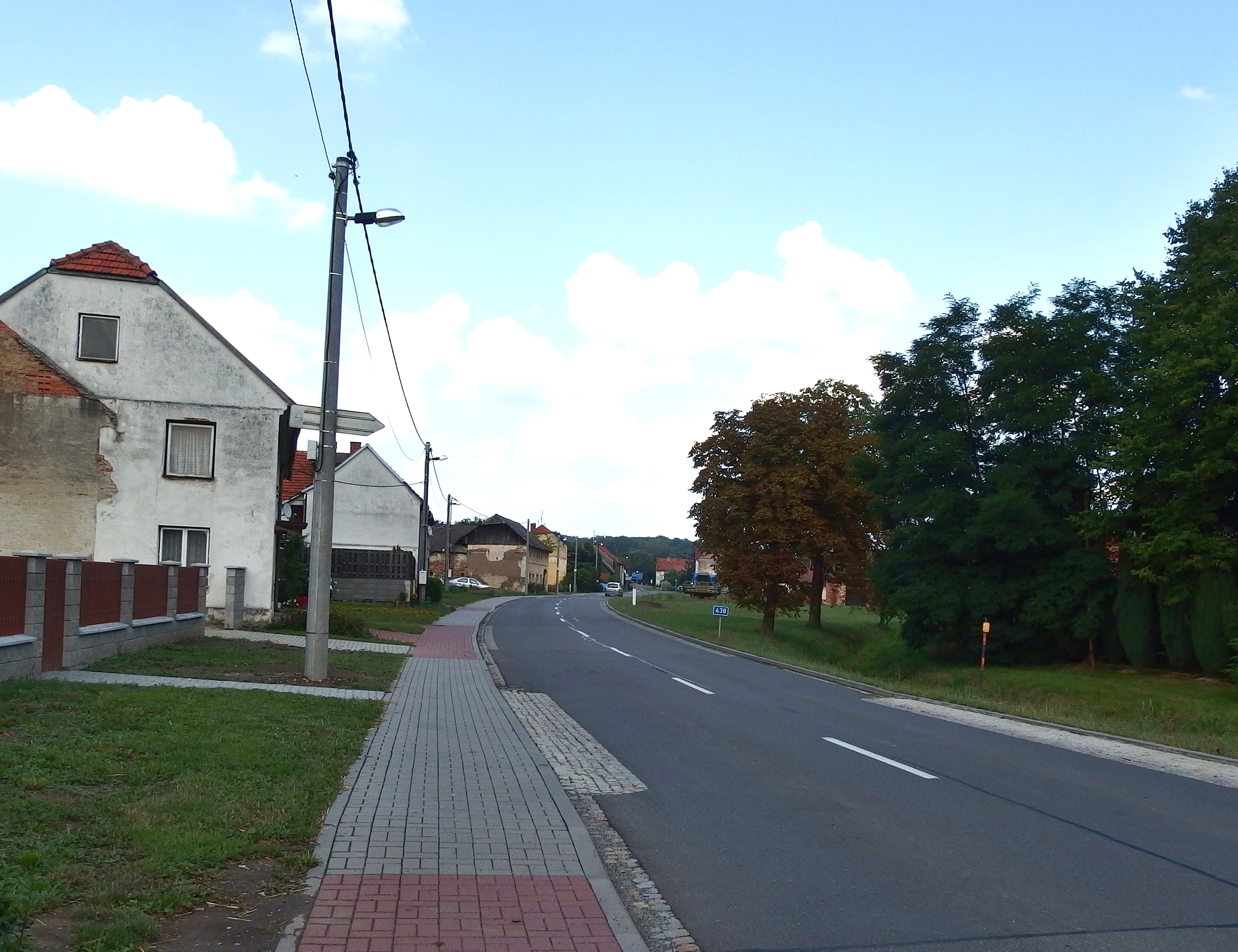
- Main street

- Flag Coat of arms

- Location in the Czech Republic
- Coordinates: 49°28′3″N 17°42′51″E
- Country: Czech Republic
- Region: Olomouc
- District: Přerov
- First mentioned: 1372

Area
  - Total: 5.99 km^{2} (2.31 sq mi)
- Elevation: 278 m (912 ft)

Population (2026-01-01)
  - Total: 373
  - Density: 62.3/km^{2} (161/sq mi)
- Time zone: UTC+1 (CET)
  - Summer (DST): UTC+2 (CEST)
- Postal code: 753 53
- Website: www.byskovice.cz

Býškovice is a municipality and village in Přerov District in the Olomouc Region of the Czech Republic. It has about 400 inhabitants.

Býškovice lies approximately 20 kilometres (12 mi) east of Přerov, 37 km (23 mi) south-east of Olomouc, and 247 km (153 mi) east of Prague.

== Demographics ==
Historical population
Year	Pop.	±%
1869	469	—
1880	476	+1.5%
1890	461	−3.2%
1900	422	−8.5%
1910	481	+14.0%
1921	491	+2.1%
1930	516	+5.1%
1950	437	−15.3%
1961	450	+3.0%
1970	404	−10.2%
1980	422	+4.5%
1991	371	−12.1%
2001	365	−1.6%
2011	388	+6.3%
2021	368	−5.2%
Source: Censuses
