= Přerov District =

Přerov District Okres Přerov
- District
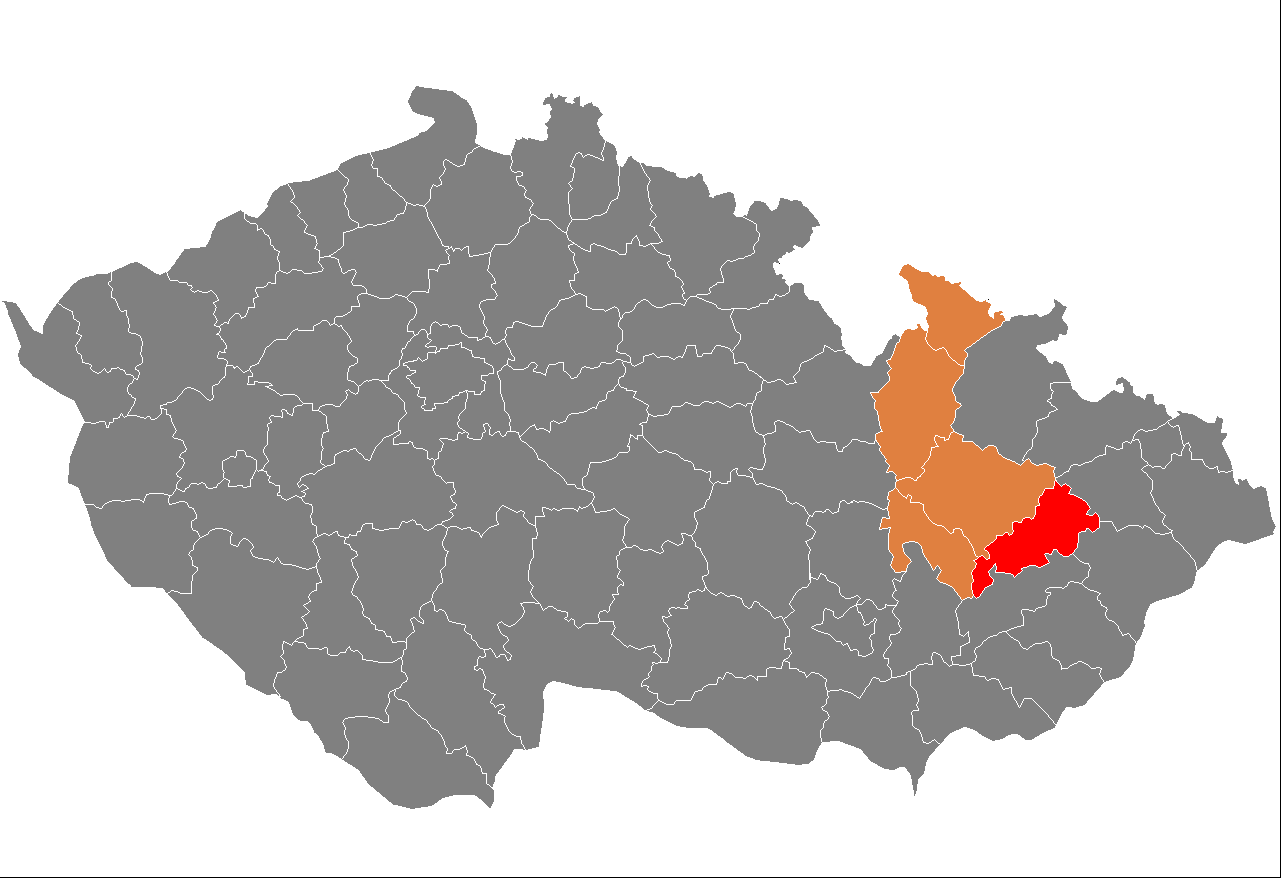
- Location in the Olomouc Region within the Czech Republic
- Coordinates: 49°30′N 17°35′E
- Country: Czech Republic
- Region: Olomouc
- Capital: Přerov

Area
  - Total: 854.35 km^{2} (329.87 sq mi)

Population (2026)
  - Total: 126,664
  - Density: 148.26/km^{2} (383.99/sq mi)
- Time zone: UTC+1 (CET)
  - Summer (DST): UTC+2 (CEST)
- Municipalities: 105
- * Cities and towns: 6
- * Market towns: 3

Přerov District (Czech: okres Přerov) is a district in the Olomouc Region of the Czech Republic. Its capital is the city of Přerov.

== Administrative division ==
Přerov District is divided into three administrative districts of municipalities with extended competence: Přerov, Hranice and Lipník nad Bečvou.

=== List of municipalities ===
Cities and towns are marked in bold and market towns in italics:

Bělotín - Beňov - Bezuchov - Bohuslávky - Bochoř - Brodek u Přerova - Buk - Býškovice - Čechy - Čelechovice - Černotín - Císařov - Citov - Dobrčice - Dolní Nětčice - Dolní Těšice - Dolní Újezd - Domaželice - Dřevohostice - Grymov - Hlinsko - Horní Moštěnice - Horní Nětčice - Horní Těšice - Horní Újezd - Hrabůvka - Hradčany - Hranice - Hustopeče nad Bečvou - Jezernice - Jindřichov - Kladníky - Klokočí - Kojetín - Kokory - Křenovice - Křtomil - Lazníčky - Lazníky - Lhota - Lhotka - Lipník nad Bečvou - Lipová - Líšná - Lobodice - Malhotice - Měrovice nad Hanou - Milenov - Milotice nad Bečvou - Nahošovice - Nelešovice - Oldřichov - Olšovec - Opatovice - Oplocany - Oprostovice - Osek nad Bečvou - Paršovice - Partutovice - Pavlovice u Přerova - Podolí - Polkovice - Polom - Potštát - Přerov - Přestavlky - Prosenice - Provodovice - Radíkov - Radkova Lhota - Radkovy - Radotín - Radslavice - Radvanice - Rakov - Rokytnice - Rouské - Říkovice - Skalička - Soběchleby - Sobíšky - Stará Ves - Stříbrnice - Střítež nad Ludinou - Sušice - Šišma - Špičky - Teplice nad Bečvou - Tovačov - Troubky - Tučín - Turovice - Týn nad Bečvou - Uhřičice - Ústí - Veselíčko - Věžky - Vlkoš - Všechovice - Výkleky - Zábeštní Lhota - Žákovice - Zámrsky - Želatovice

== Geography ==
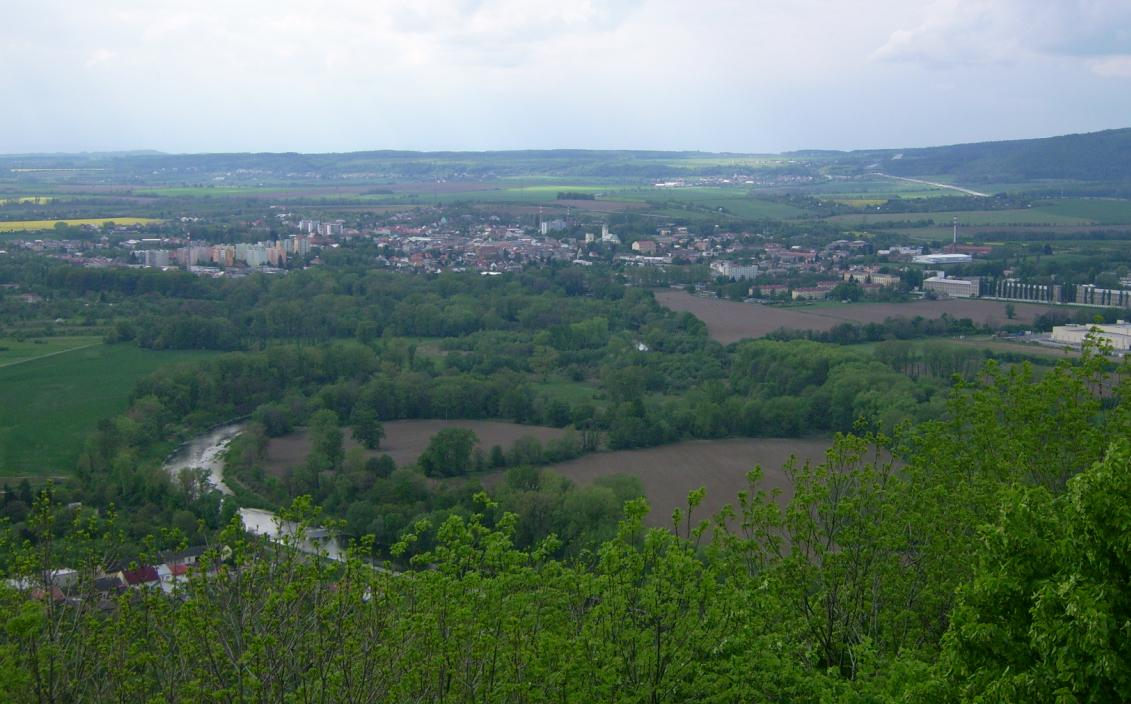
Lipník nad Bečvou and surrounding landscape

The landscape is mainly flat in the west and undulating in the east. The district is characterised by a deforested fertile landscape. The territory extends into five geomorphological mesoregions: Upper Morava Valley (west), Nízký Jeseník (north), Moravian Gate (a strip from east to centre), Moravian-Silesian Foothills (south), and Litenčice Hills (a small part in the southwest). The highest point of the district is the hill Strážná in Luboměř pod Strážnou with an elevation of 642 m (2,106 ft) and the lowest point is the river bed of the Morava in Kojetín at 191 m (627 ft).

From the total district area of 854.4 km^{2} (329.9 sq mi), agricultural land occupies 584.4 km^{2} (225.6 sq mi), forests occupy 140.1 km^{2} (54.1 sq mi), and water area occupies 18.4 km^{2} (7.1 sq mi). Forests cover 16.4% of the district's area.

The largest river is the Morava, which crosses the territory in its western part. The longest river within the district is the Bečva, which flows across the district from east to west and then joins the Morava. Around the Morava there are several ponds and artificial lakes created by flooding gravel quarries; otherwise there are not many bodies of water.

There are no large-scale protected areas.

== Demographics ==
Historical population

Year	Pop.	±%
1869	86,552	—
1880	96,129	+11.1%
1890	102,077	+6.2%
1900	108,967	+6.7%
1910	119,773	+9.9%

Year	Pop.	±%
1921	121,169	+1.2%
1930	127,854	+5.5%
1950	117,963	−7.7%
1961	127,862	+8.4%
1970	133,976	+4.8%

Year	Pop.	±%
1980	139,691	+4.3%
1991	138,528	−0.8%
2001	136,040	−1.8%
2011	130,205	−4.3%
2021	124,129	−4.7%

Source: Censuses

=== Most populous municipalities ===
Name	Population	Area (km^{2})
Přerov	40,492	58
Hranice	17,910	50
Lipník nad Bečvou	8,000	31
Kojetín	5,721	31
Tovačov	2,472	23
Troubky	1,996	21
Bělotín	1,883	33
Brodek u Přerova	1,843	9
Hustopeče nad Bečvou	1,705	24
Horní Moštěnice	1,676	10

== Economy ==
The largest employers with headquarters in Přerov District and at least 500 employees are:

Economic entity	Location	Number of employees	Main activity
Meopta - optika	Přerov	1,000–1,499	Manufacture of optical instruments
SSI Schäfer	Hranice	1,000–1,499	Manufacture of metal structures
Eagle Eyes	Hranice	500–999	Private security activities
Hranice Hospital	Hranice	500–999	Health care
KROK CZ	Hranice	500–999	Manufacture of work clothes
DPOV	Přerov	500–999	Repair and maintenance of rolling stock
Pivovary Zubr	Přerov	500–999	Manufacture of beer
Precheza	Přerov	500–999	Chemical industry

== Transport ==
The D1 motorway (part of the European route E462) from Brno to Ostrava runs across the district. An unfinished section of the motorway is replaced by the I/55 road. The D35 motorway heading to Olomouc separates from the D1 near Lipník nad Bečvou. The D48 motorway heading to Frýdek-Místek (further continuation of the European route E462) separates from the D1 near Hranice.

== Sights ==
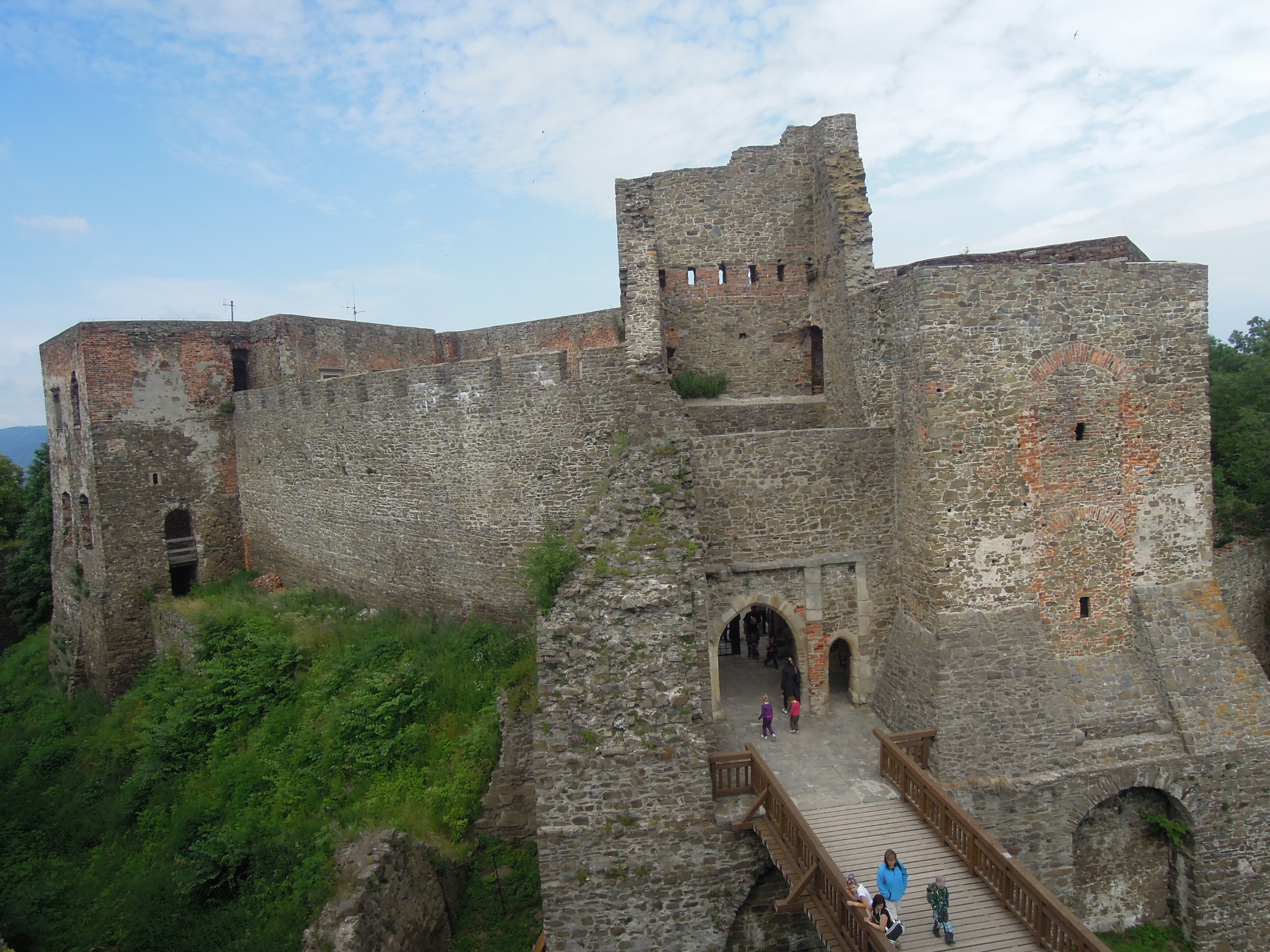
Helfštýn Castle

There are no national cultural monuments in the district.

The best-preserved settlements, protected as monument reservations and monument zones, are:

- Lipník nad Bečvou (monument reservation)
- Hranice
- Potštát
- Přerov
- Tovačov
- Lhotka
- Stará Ves
- Uhřičice

The most visited tourist destination is the Helfštýn Castle.
