= Hrabůvka =

- Municipality
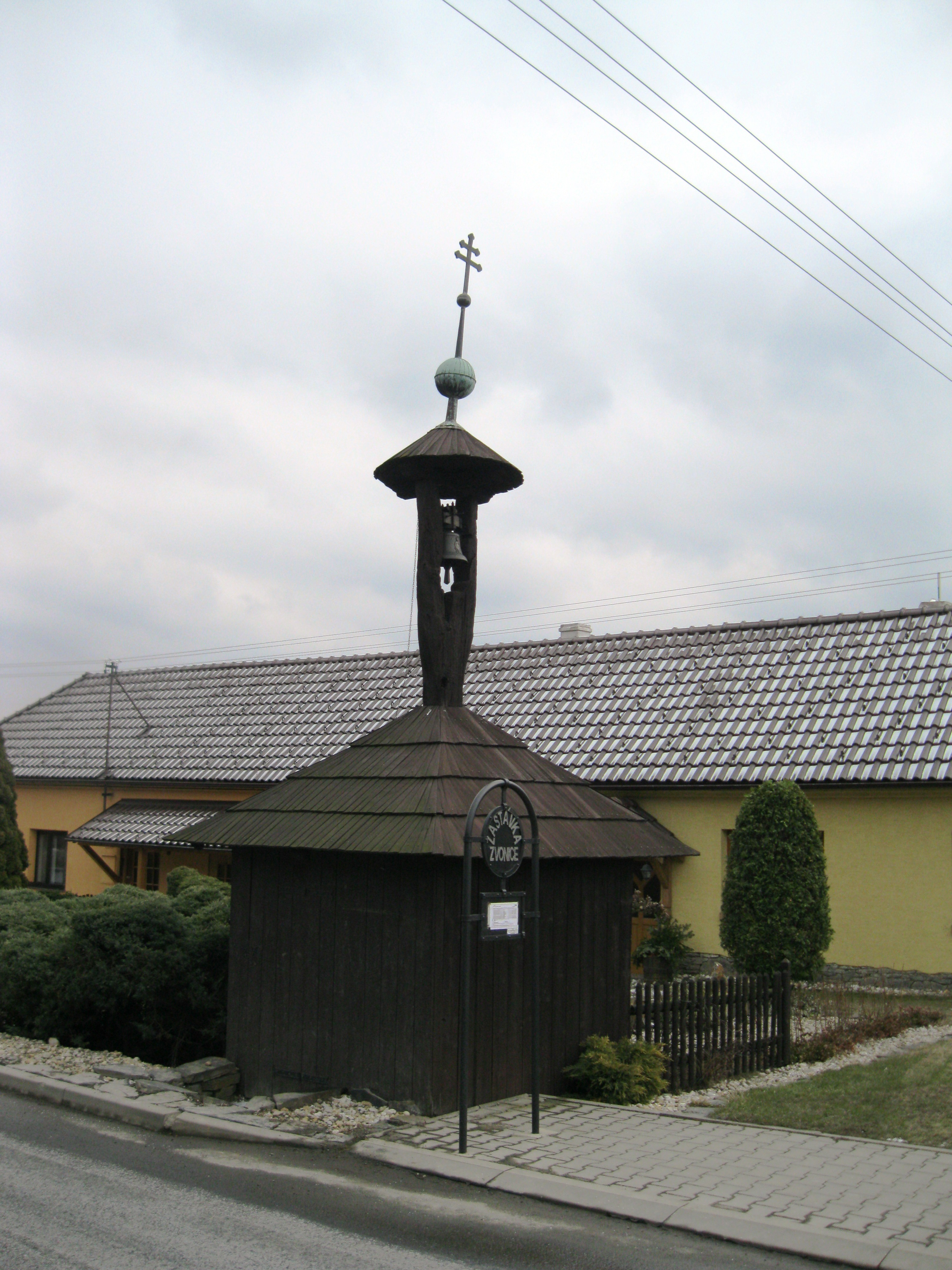
- Belfry

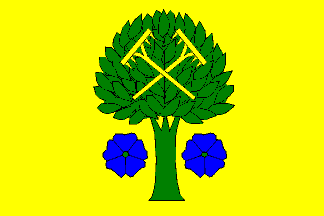
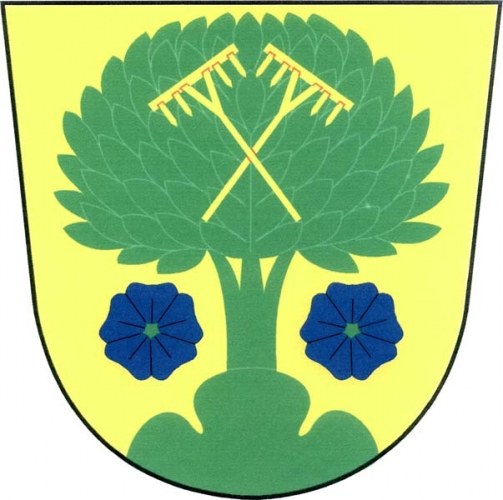
- Flag Coat of arms

- Location in the Czech Republic
- Coordinates: 49°34′43″N 17°41′29″E
- Country: Czech Republic
- Region: Olomouc
- District: Přerov
- First mentioned: 1371

Area
  - Total: 3.06 km^{2} (1.18 sq mi)
- Elevation: 338 m (1,109 ft)

Population (2026-01-01)
  - Total: 334
  - Density: 109/km^{2} (283/sq mi)
- Time zone: UTC+1 (CET)
  - Summer (DST): UTC+2 (CEST)
- Postal code: 753 01
- Website: www.hrabuvka.cz

Hrabůvka is a municipality and village in Přerov District in the Olomouc Region of the Czech Republic. It has about 300 inhabitants.

Hrabůvka lies approximately 22 kilometres (14 mi) north-east of Přerov, 32 km (20 mi) east of Olomouc, and 241 km (150 mi) east of Prague.

== Demographics ==
Historical population
Year	Pop.	±%
1869	187	—
1880	187	+0.0%
1890	190	+1.6%
1900	205	+7.9%
1910	422	+105.9%
1921	397	−5.9%
1930	498	+25.4%
1950	354	−28.9%
1961	402	+13.6%
1970	360	−10.4%
1980	357	−0.8%
1991	294	−17.6%
2001	327	+11.2%
2011	305	−6.7%
2021	295	−3.3%
Source: Censuses
