= Hlinsko (Přerov District) =

- Municipality
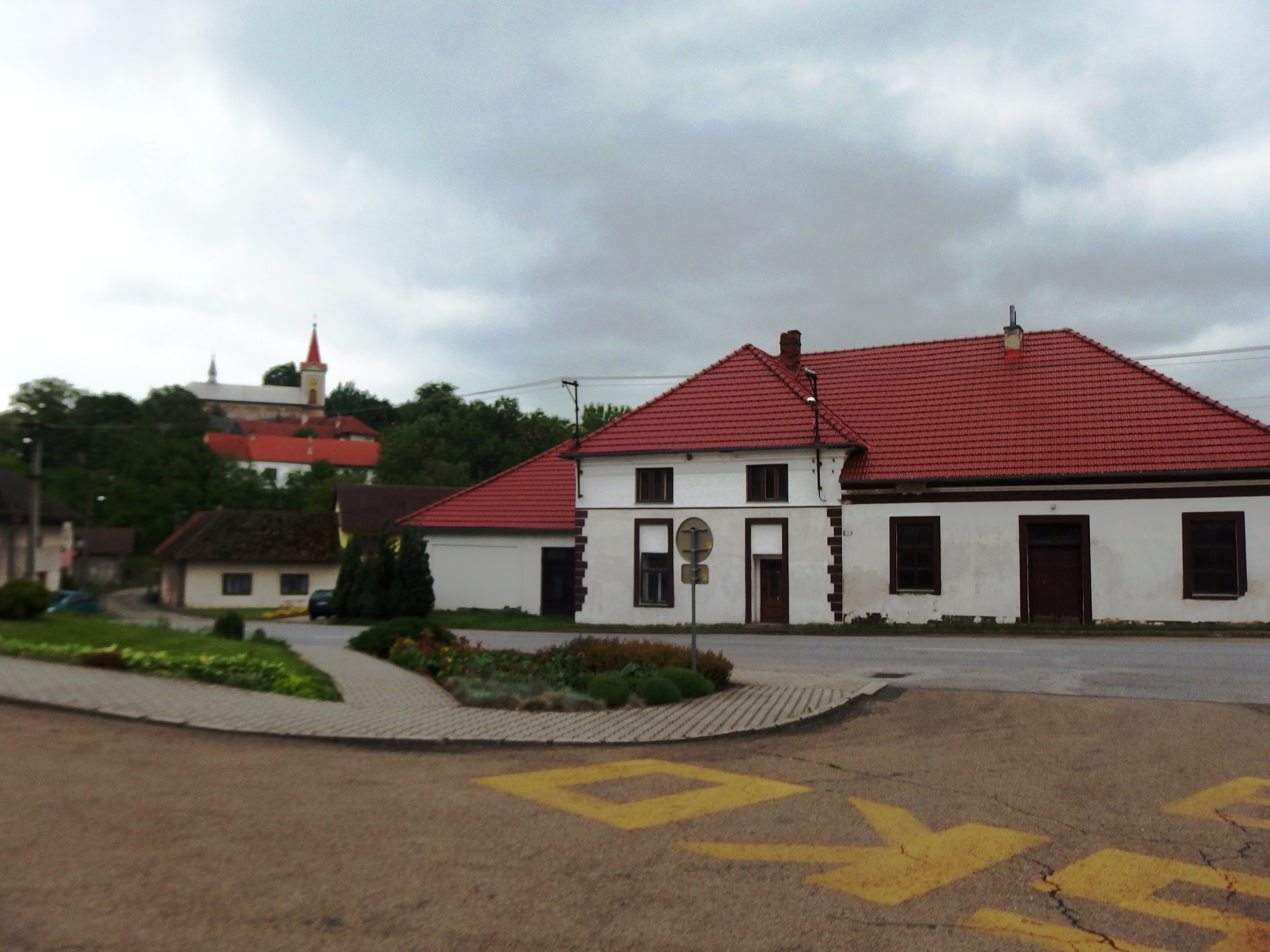
- Centre of Hlinsko

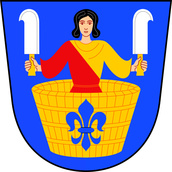
- Flag Coat of arms

- Location in the Czech Republic
- Coordinates: 49°29′40″N 17°34′45″E
- Country: Czech Republic
- Region: Olomouc
- District: Přerov
- First mentioned: 1304

Area
  - Total: 5.02 km^{2} (1.94 sq mi)
- Elevation: 294 m (965 ft)

Population (2026-01-01)
  - Total: 231
  - Density: 46.0/km^{2} (119/sq mi)
- Time zone: UTC+1 (CET)
  - Summer (DST): UTC+2 (CEST)
- Postal code: 751 31
- Website: www.obec-hlinsko.cz

Hlinsko is a municipality and village in Přerov District in the Olomouc Region of the Czech Republic. It has about 200 inhabitants.

Hlinsko lies approximately 12 kilometres (7 mi) north-east of Přerov, 27 km (17 mi) south-east of Olomouc, and 237 km (147 mi) east of Prague.

== Demographics ==
Historical population
Year	Pop.	±%
1869	352	—
1880	328	−6.8%
1890	313	−4.6%
1900	303	−3.2%
1910	314	+3.6%
1921	292	−7.0%
1930	296	+1.4%
1950	297	+0.3%
1961	291	−2.0%
1970	277	−4.8%
1980	256	−7.6%
1991	223	−12.9%
2001	202	−9.4%
2011	209	+3.5%
2021	225	+7.7%
Source: Censuses
