= Oplocany =

- Municipality
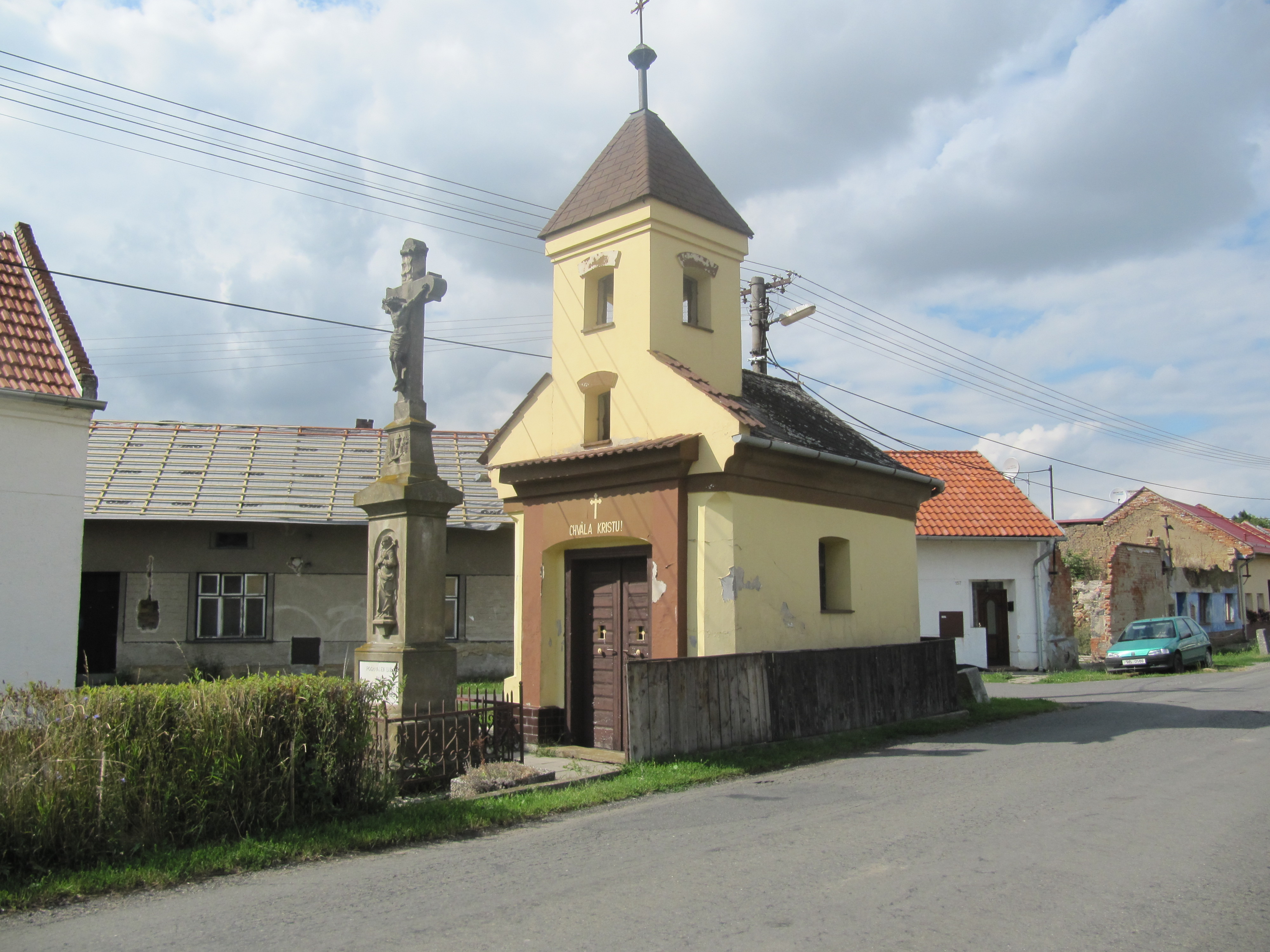
- Chapel of Saint Ernest

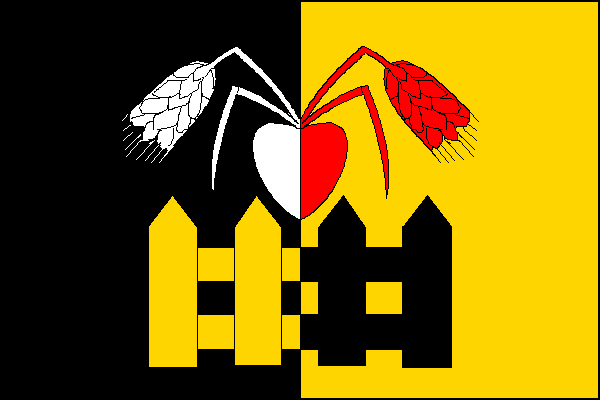
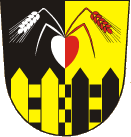
- Flag Coat of arms

- Location in the Czech Republic
- Coordinates: 49°24′34″N 17°15′37″E
- Country: Czech Republic
- Region: Olomouc
- District: Přerov
- First mentioned: 1141

Area
  - Total: 5.45 km^{2} (2.10 sq mi)
- Elevation: 200 m (660 ft)

Population (2026-01-01)
  - Total: 379
  - Density: 69.5/km^{2} (180/sq mi)
- Time zone: UTC+1 (CET)
  - Summer (DST): UTC+2 (CEST)
- Postal code: 751 01
- Website: www.oplocany.cz

Oplocany is a municipality and village in Přerov District in the Olomouc Region of the Czech Republic. It has about 400 inhabitants.

Oplocany lies approximately 15 kilometres (9 mi) west of Přerov, 21 km (13 mi) south of Olomouc, and 219 km (136 mi) east of Prague.

== Demographics ==
Historical population
Year	Pop.	±%
1869	621	—
1880	629	+1.3%
1890	698	+11.0%
1900	717	+2.7%
1910	805	+12.3%
1921	707	−12.2%
1930	647	−8.5%
1950	521	−19.5%
1961	516	−1.0%
1970	456	−11.6%
1980	450	−1.3%
1991	358	−20.4%
2001	334	−6.7%
2011	289	−13.5%
2021	298	+3.1%
Source: Censuses
