= Opatovice (Přerov District) =

- Municipality
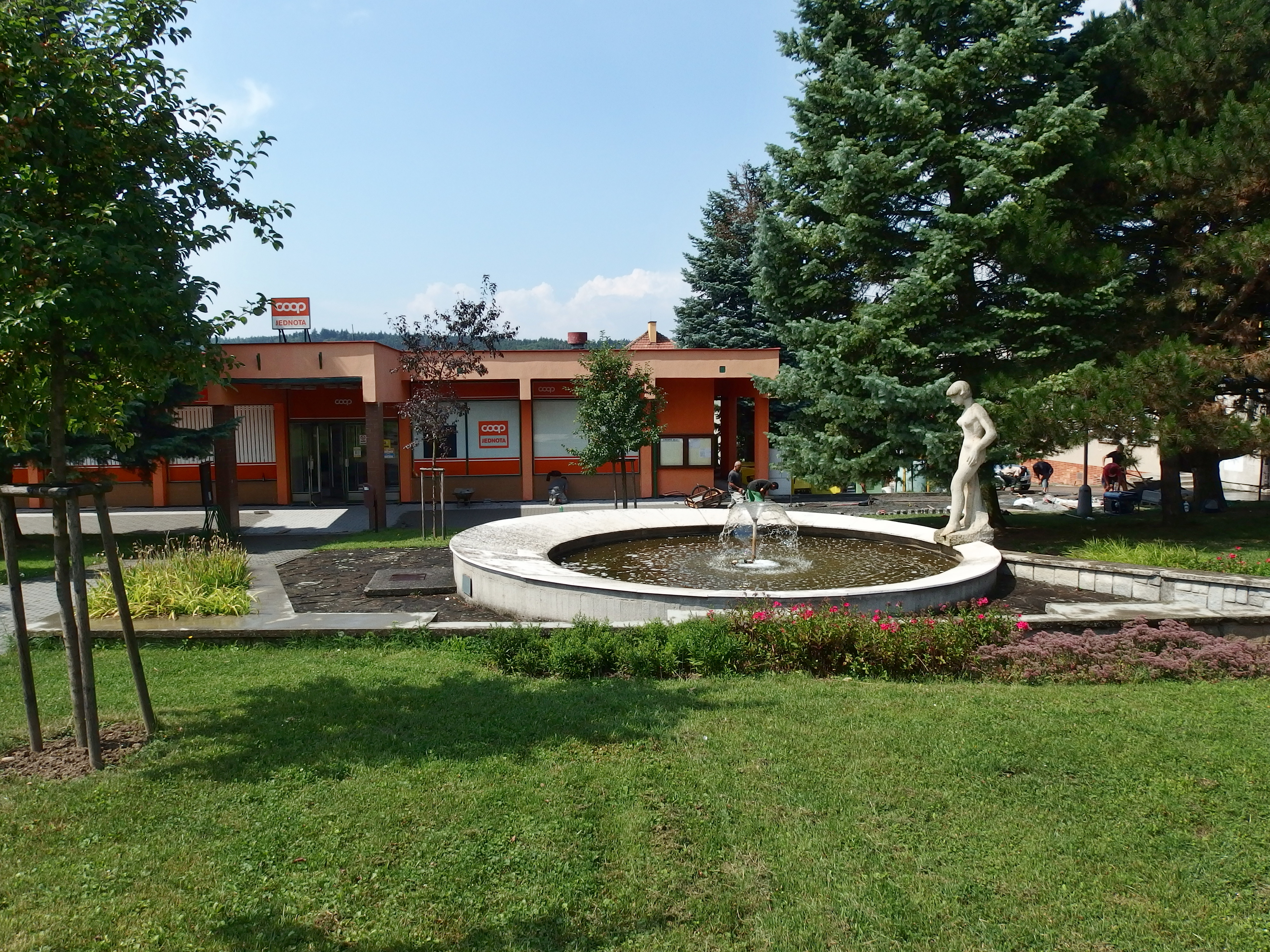
- Fountain in the centre of Opatovice

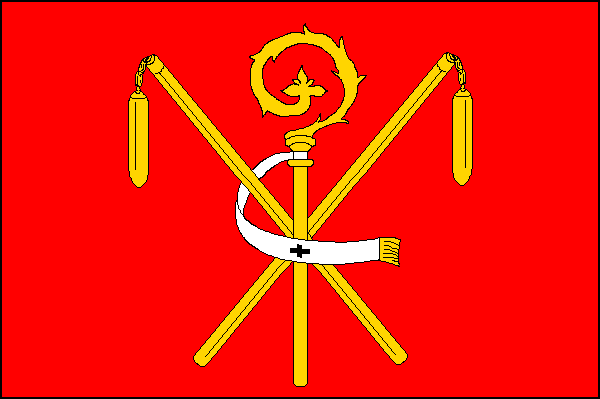
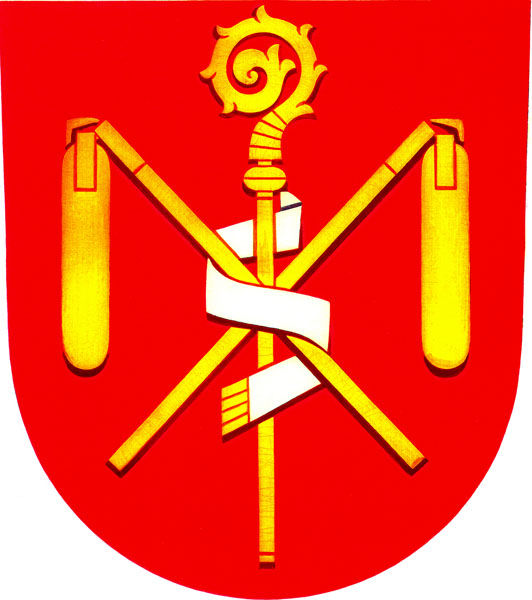
- Flag Coat of arms

- Location in the Czech Republic
- Coordinates: 49°29′57″N 17°44′21″E
- Country: Czech Republic
- Region: Olomouc
- District: Přerov
- First mentioned: 1447

Area
  - Total: 7.97 km^{2} (3.08 sq mi)
- Elevation: 291 m (955 ft)

Population (2026-01-01)
  - Total: 801
  - Density: 101/km^{2} (260/sq mi)
- Time zone: UTC+1 (CET)
  - Summer (DST): UTC+2 (CEST)
- Postal code: 753 56
- Website: www.opatovice.cz

Opatovice is a municipality and village in Přerov District in the Olomouc Region of the Czech Republic. It has about 800 inhabitants.

Opatovice lies approximately 22 kilometres (14 mi) east of Přerov, 37 km (23 mi) east of Olomouc, and 248 km (154 mi) east of Prague.

== Demographics ==
Historical population
Year	Pop.	±%
1869	607	—
1880	595	−2.0%
1890	559	−6.1%
1900	546	−2.3%
1910	630	+15.4%
1921	637	+1.1%
1930	658	+3.3%
1950	665	+1.1%
1961	743	+11.7%
1970	749	+0.8%
1980	729	−2.7%
1991	688	−5.6%
2001	755	+9.7%
2011	755	+0.0%
2021	774	+2.5%
Source: Censuses
