= List of castles in the Olomouc Region =

This is a list of castles and chateaux located in the Olomouc Region of the Czech Republic.

== B ==
- Bílá Lhota Chateau
- Bludov Castle
- Bludov Chateau
- Boreš Chateau
- Bouzov Castle
- Branná Chateau
- Brníčko Castle
- Brodek u Prostějova Chateau

== C ==
- Chudobín Chateau
- Citov Chateau
- Čechy pod Kosířem Chateau
- Čekyně Chateau
- Černá Voda Chateau
- Čertův Hrádek Castle

== D ==
- Dlouhá Loučka Chateau
- Dobromilice Chateau
- Dolany Chateau
- Doloplazy Chateau
- Drahotuše Castle
- Dřevohostice Chateau

== E ==
- Edelštejn Castle

== F ==
- Frankštát Castle

== H ==
- Haňovice Chateau
- Helfštýn Castle
- Hluboký Castle
- Hluchov Chateau
- Horní Moštěnice Chateau
- Hoštejn Castle
- Hranice Chateau
- Hrubčice Chateau
- Hustopeče nad Bečvou Chateau

== J ==
- Jánský vrch Chateau
- Jesenec Chateau
- Jeseník Chateau

== K ==
- Kaltenštejn Castle
- Koberštejn Castle
- Konice Chateau
- Kožušany Chateau
- Krakovec Chateau
- Kralice na Hané Chateau
- Kunzov Chateau

== L ==
- Laškov Chateau
- Leuchtenštejn Castle
- Lhotsko Chateau
- Lipník nad Bečvou Chateau
- Líšnice Castle
- Loučná nad Desnou Chateau

== M ==
- Malhotice Chateau
- Mírov Castle
- Mořice Chateau

== N ==
- Náměšť na Hané Castle
- Náměšť na Hané Chateau
- Nenakonice Chateau
- Nezamyslice Chateau
- Nové Zámky Chateau
- Nový Hrad (u Hanušovic) Castle

== O ==
- Olomouc Castle
- Otaslavice Castle

== P ==
- Pavlovice u Přerova Chateau
- Plumlov Chateau
- Polkovice Chateau
- Potštát Chateau
- Prostějov Chateau
- Přemyslovice Chateau
- Přerov Chateau
- Přestavlky Chateau
- Ptení Chateau
- Puchart Castle
- Pustý Zámek Castle

== R ==
- Rabštejn (u Rýmařova) Castle
- Rokytnice Chateau
- Ruda nad Moravou Chateau
- Rybáře Castle
- Rychleby Castle
- Říkovice Chateau

== S ==
- Skalička Chateau
- Sobotín Chateau
- Sovinec Castle
- Stražisko Castle
- Svrčov Castle
- Špránek Castle
- Šternberk Castle
- Šumperk Chateau

== T ==
- Tepenec Castle
- Tovačov Chateau
- Tršice Chateau

== U ==
- Úsov Chateau

== V ==
- Velká Bystřice Chateau
- Velké Losiny Chateau
- Velký Týnec Chateau
- Veselíčko Chateau
- Vlčice Chateau
- Vřesovice Chateau
- Vsisko Chateau
- Všechovice Chateau
- Výšovice Chateau

== Z ==
- Žádlovice Chateau
- Žerotín Chateau
- Žulová Castle
- Zábřeh Chateau

== See also ==
- List of castles in the Czech Republic
- List of castles in Europe
- List of castles
