= Martin Schaffner =

Martin Schaffner may refer to:

- Martin Schaffner (artist) (1478–1548), German painter and medallist
- Martin Schaffner (pharmacist) (c. 1564–1608), Bohemian pharmacist and chemist
- Martin Hugo Schaffner (1923–1965), Swiss entrepreneur
