= Retirement home =

Housing facility for the elderly persons

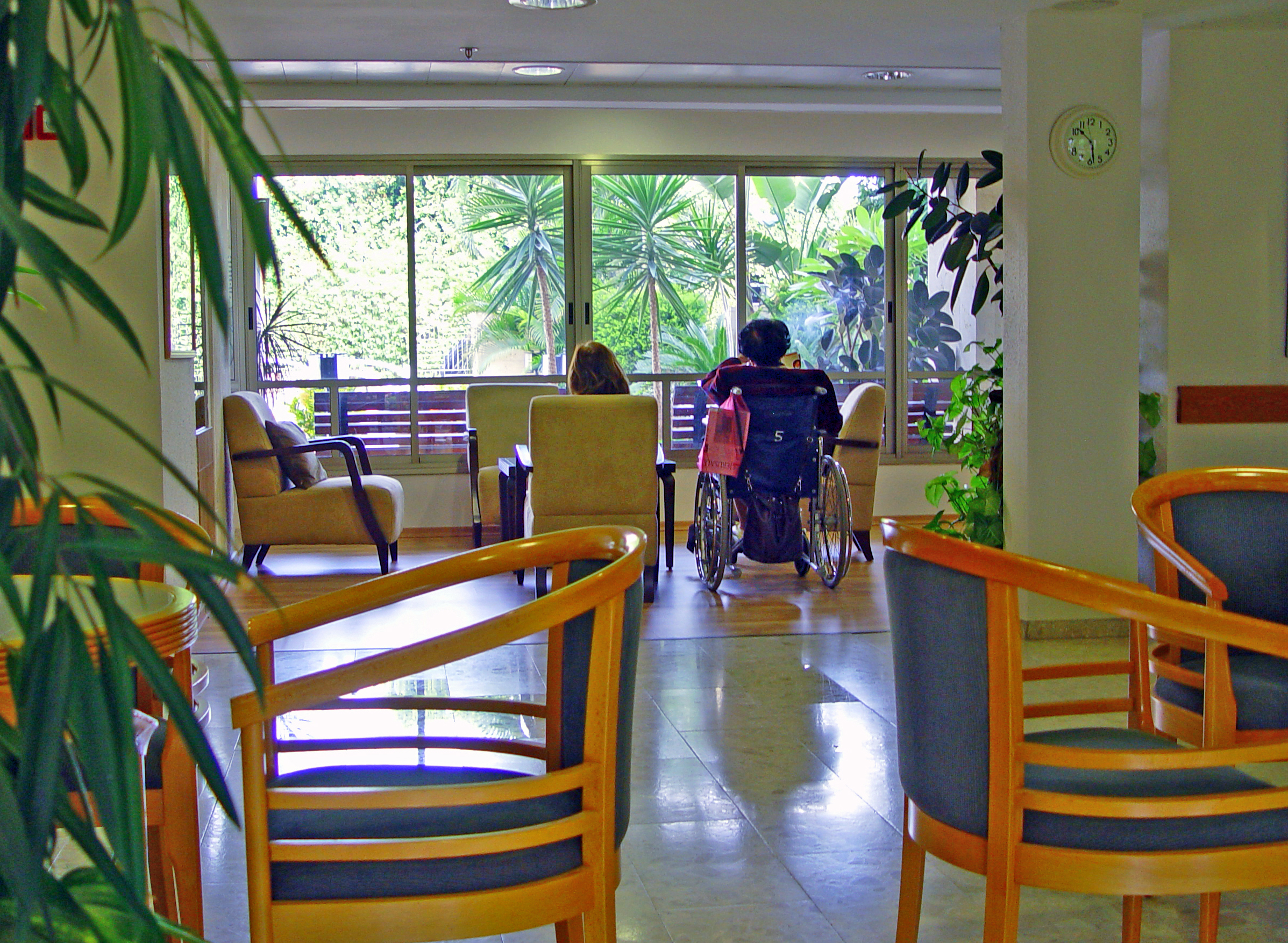
A retirement home in Israel in 2010

A retirement home – sometimes called an old people's home, old folks' home, or old age home, although old people's home can also refer to a nursing home – or rest home, is a multi-residence housing facility intended for the elderly.

Typically, each person or couple in the home has an apartment-style room or suite of rooms with an en-suite bathroom. Additional facilities are provided within the building. This can include facilities for meals, gatherings, recreation activities, and some form of health or hospital care. A place in a retirement home can be paid for on a rental basis, like an apartment, or can be bought in perpetuity on the same basis as a condominium.

A retirement home differs from a nursing home primarily in the level of medical care given. Retirement communities, unlike retirement homes, offer separate and autonomous homes for residents.

Retirement homes offer meal-making and some personal-care services like, fall prevention, security and access control. Assisted-living facilities, memory-care facilities and nursing homes can all be referred to as retirement homes. The cost of living in a retirement home varies from $25,000 to $100,000 per year, although it can exceed this range, according to Senior Living Near Me's senior housing guide.

In the United Kingdom, there were about 750,000 places across 25,000 retirement housing schemes in 2021 with a forecast that numbers would grow by nearly ten percent over the next five years.

== United States ==
Proper design is integral to the experience within retirement homes, especially for those experiencing dementia. Wayfinding and spatial orientation become difficult for residents with dementia, causing confusion, agitation and a general decline in the physical and mental wellbeing.

=== Signage ===
Those living with dementia often display difficulty with distinguishing relevance of information within signage. This phenomenon can be attributed to a combination of fixative behaviors as well as a tendency towards non discriminatory reading. Therefore, in creating appropriate signage for retirement homes, we must first consider the who, what, when, where, and why of the design and placement of signage.

Considering the "who" of the user requires an understanding of those who interact with North American care homes. This group includes staff and visitors, however understandable wayfinding is most important for residents experiencing dementia. This then leads to "what" kind of information should be presented. Important information for staff, visitors, and patients covers a great variety, and altogether the amount of signage required directly conflicts with the ideal of reducing distraction, overstimulation, and non-discriminatory reading for those within retirement homes. This is where the "when", "where", and "why" of signage must be addressed. In deciding “when” information should be presented, Tetsuya argues that it is "important that essential visual information be provided at a relatively early stage in walking routes."

Therefore, we can assume that immediately relevant information such as the direction of available facilities should be placed near the entrance of patient rooms, or at the end of hallways housing patient rooms. This observation also leads into "where" appropriate placement would be for information, and "why" it is being presented. In regards to wayfinding signage, making navigation as understandable as possible can be achieved by avoiding distraction while navigating. Addressing this, Romedi Passini suggests that "graphic wayfinding information notices along circulation routes should be clear and limited in number and other information should be placed somewhere else."

Signage not related to wayfinding can be distracting if placed nearby, and detract from the effectiveness of wayfinding signage. Instead, Passini suggests "to create little alcoves specifically designed for posting public announcements, invitations, and publicity." These alcoves would best be placed in areas of low stimulation, as they would be better understood in a context that is not overwhelming. In a study done by Kristen Day, it was observed that areas of high stimulation were "found to occur in elevators, corridors, nursing stations, bathing rooms, and other residents' rooms, whereas low stimulation has been observed in activity and dining rooms". As such, we can assume that activity and dining rooms would be the best place for these alcoves to reside.

=== Architectural cues ===
Another relevant method of wayfinding is the presence of architectural cues within North American senior retirement homes. This method is most often considered during the design of new senior care centers, however there are still multiple items that can easily be implemented within existing care homes as well. Architectural cues can impact residents by communicating purpose through the implied use of a setting or object, assisting in navigation without the need for cognitive mapping, and making areas more accessible and less distressing for those with decreased mobility.

We will investigate how architectural cues communicate purpose and influence the behavior of residents. In a case study by Passini,"a patient, seeing a doorbell (for night use) at the hospital, immediately decided to ring". This led to the conclusion that “architectural elements ... determine to a certain extent the behavior of less independent patients.” In considering the influence of architectural cues on residents, this becomes an important observation, as it suggests that positive behavior can be encouraged through the use of careful planning of rooms. This claim is further supported in a case study by Day, in which "frequency of toilet use increased dramatically when toilets were visibly accessible to residents." Having toilets placed within the sight lines of the residents encourages behavior of more frequently visiting the washroom, lessening the burden on nursing staff as well as leading to increased health of the residents. This communication of purpose though learned behavior can translate into creating more legible interior design as well. Through the use of distinctive furniture and flooring such as a bookshelf in a communal living room, the functionality and differentiation of spaces can become much easier for residents to navigate. Improving environmental legibility can also be useful in assisting with navigation within a care home.

Assistance in navigation through reducing a need for complicated cognitive mapping is an asset that can be achieved in multiple ways within care centers. Visual landmarks existing in both architectural and interior design helps provide differentiation between spaces. Burton notes “residents reported that...landmarks (features such as clocks and plants at key sections of corridors)[were useful in wayfinding]" Navigating using distinct landmarks can also define individual resident rooms. Tetsuya suggests that “doors of residents' rooms should have differentiated characteristics” in order to help in differentiating their own personal rooms. This can be done through the use of personal objects placed on or beside doorways, or in providing distinctive doors for each room.

Finally, considering accessibility is integral in designing architecture within care homes. Many members of the senior community require the use of equipment and mobility aids. As such, requirements of these items must be considered in designing a senior specific space. Open and clear routes of travel benefit the user by clearly directing residents along the path and reducing difficulty caused by the use of mobility aids. Similarly, creating shorter routes of travel by moving fundamental facilities such as the dining room closer to patient rooms has also been shown to reduce anxiety and distress. Moving between spaces becomes simpler, avoiding high stimulation areas such as elevators while also assisting wayfinding by making a simpler, smaller layout. Each of these methods can be achieved through the use of open core spaces. These spaces integrate multiple rooms into a single open concept space, "giving visual access and allowing a certain understanding of space without having to integrate into an ensemble that is perceived in parts, which is the most difficult aspect of cognitive mapping". In integrating more open core spaces into North American senior facilities, spaces become more accessible and easier to navigate.

== Gallery ==
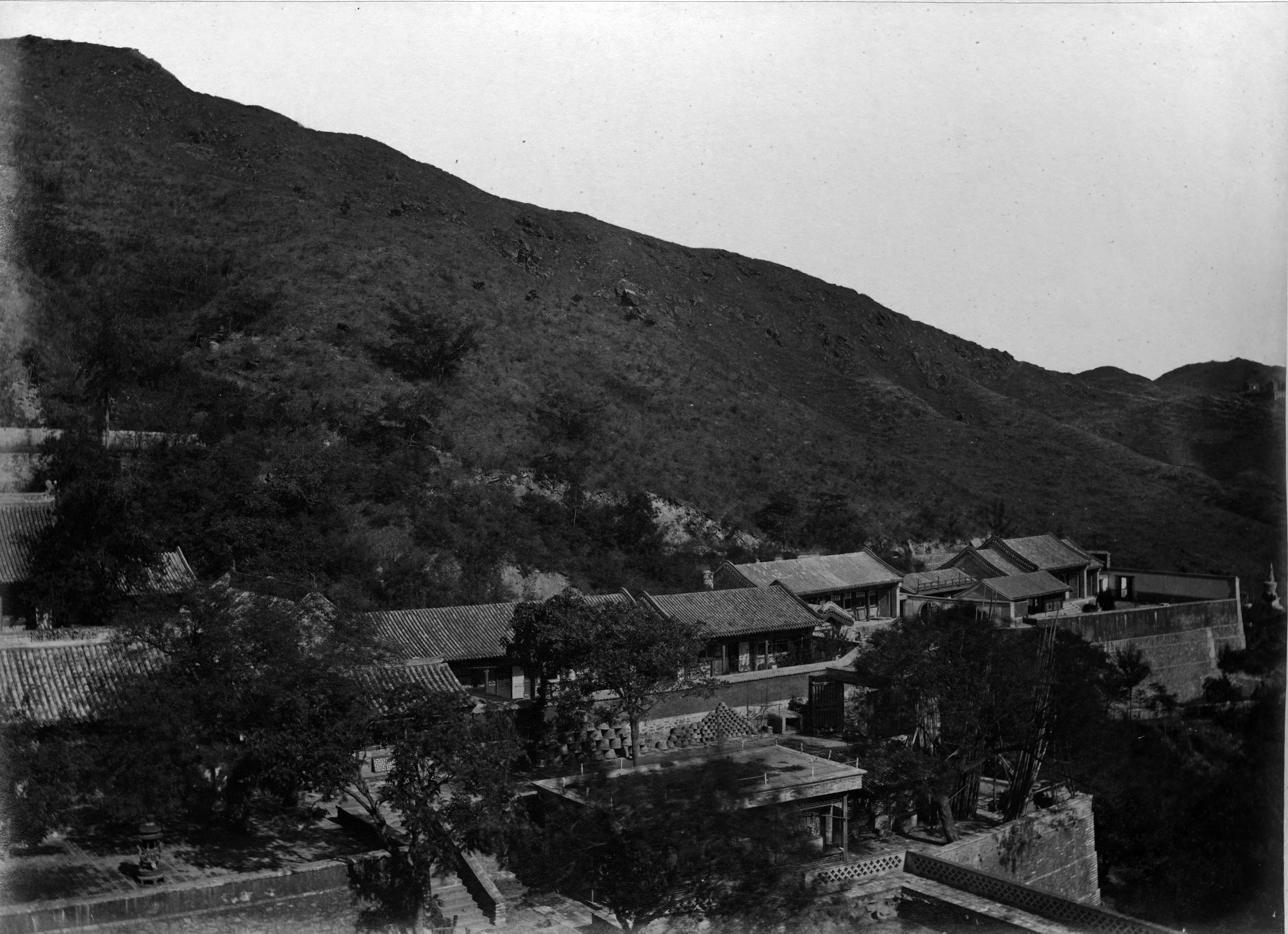
A temple for retired eunuchs in Beijing, c. 1879

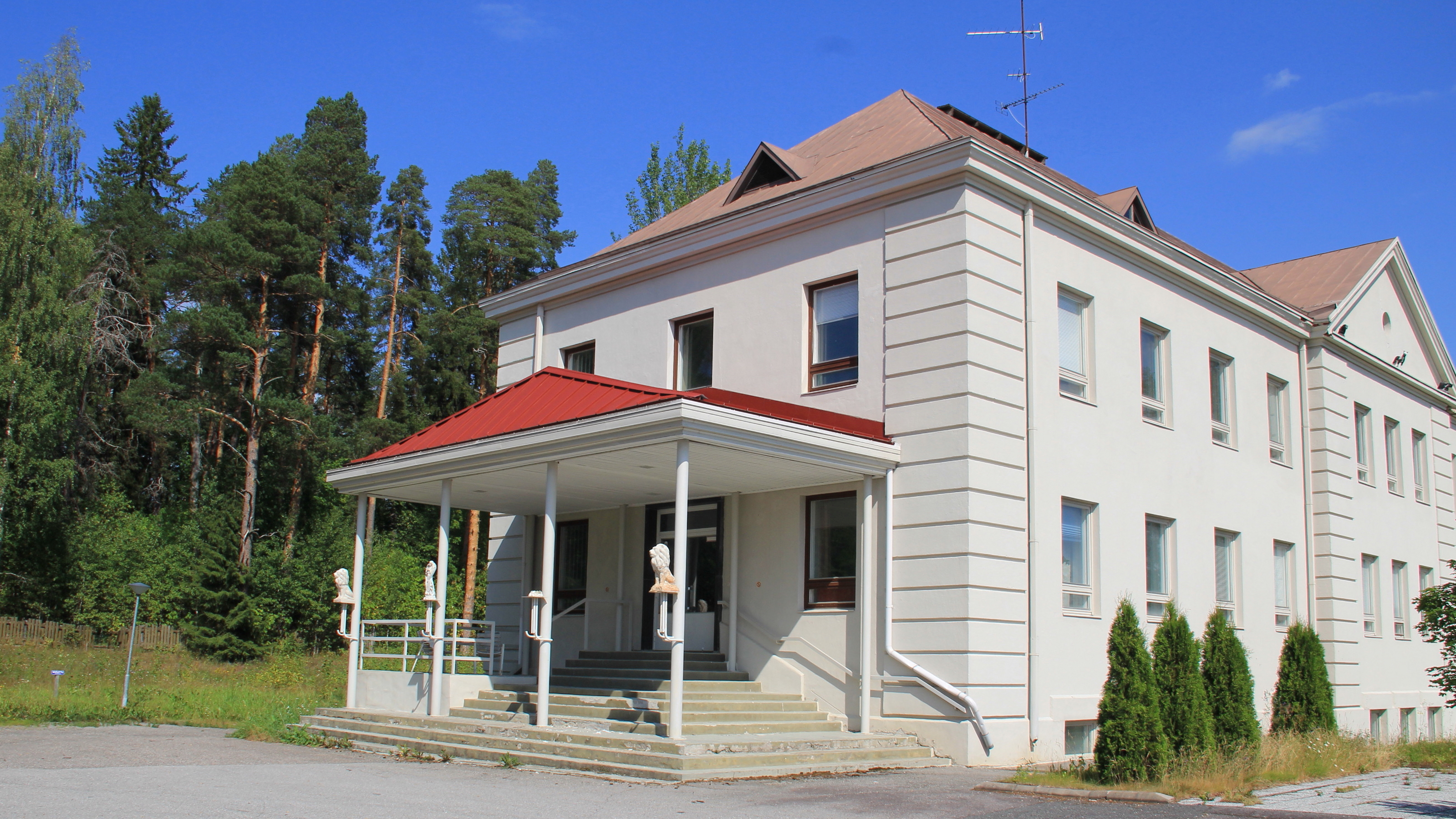
Koljonvirta retirement home in Iisalmi, Finland

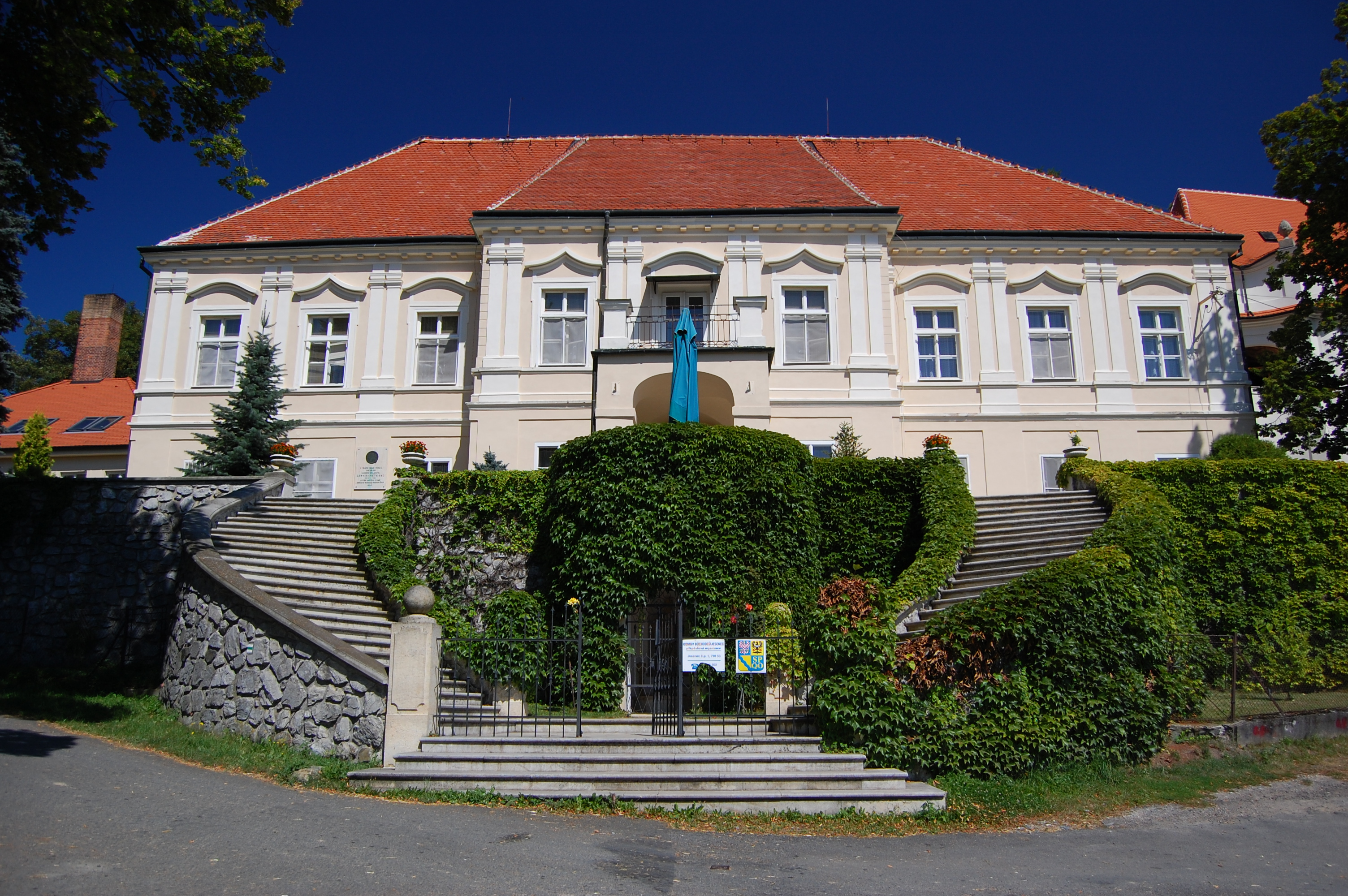
Jesenec Castle, a retirement home in the Czech Republic

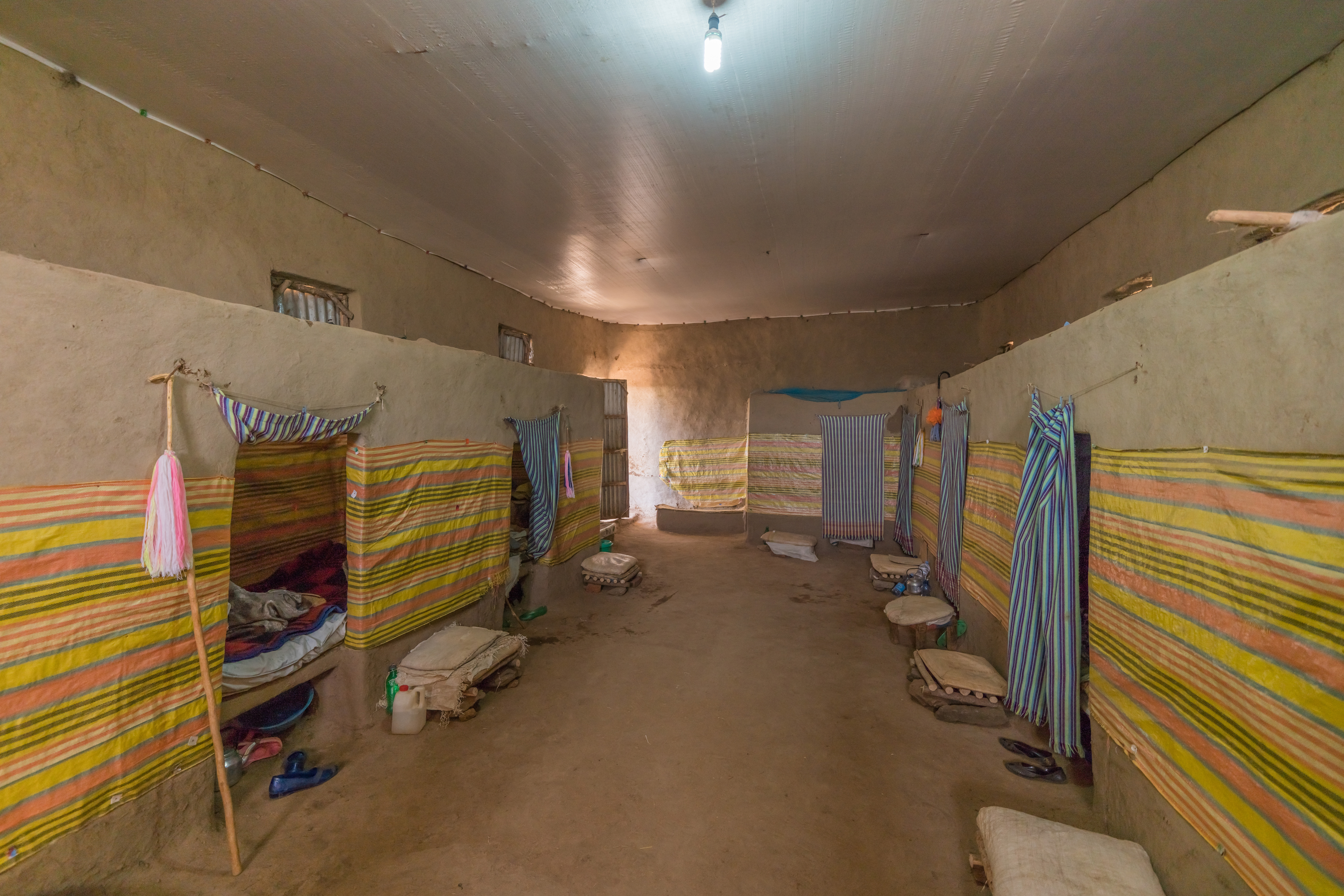
Dormitory in a retirement home in Ethiopia

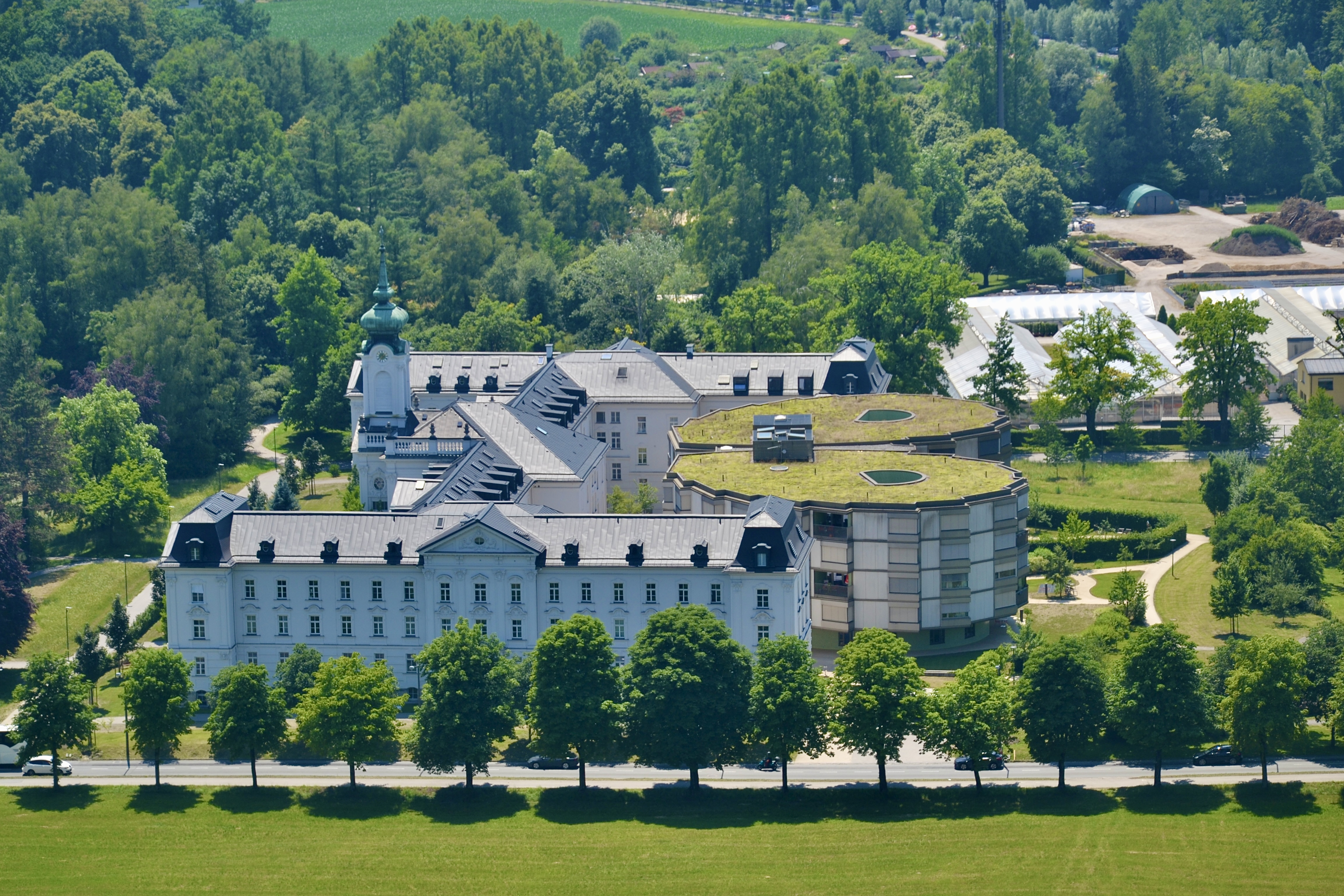
Retirement home in Salzburg, Austria

== See also ==
- Assisted living
- Elderly care
- Accessibility
