= Jacobus Sinapius =

Czech doctor

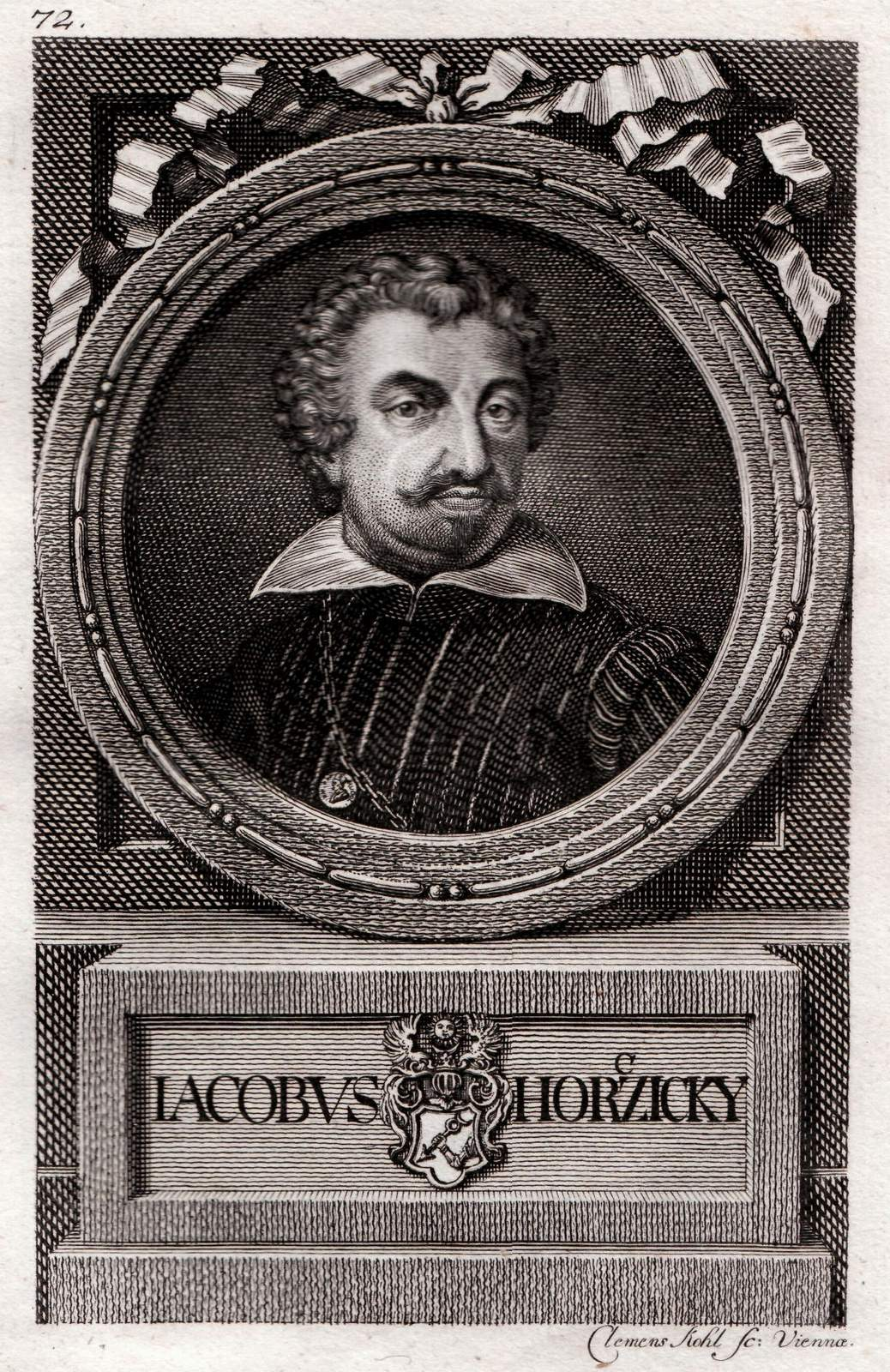
Etching of Jacobus Sinapius, copy of the original painting owned by Leop Ioh Scherschnik teacher of rhetoric of Teschen

Jacobus Sinapius or Jacobus Horcicky (Note: Also Horczicky) (modern Czech: Jakub Hořčický; 1575 – 25 September 1622), later granted the title "de Tepenec" (Note: Also Tepenecz) ('of Tepenec'; Czech: z Tepence), was a Czech pharmacist and personal doctor of Holy Roman Emperor Rudolf II. His latinized name Sinapius is a translation of his family name Hořčický, which means 'mustard' in Czech.

== Biography ==
According to his college records, Sinapius was born in Bořenovice in Moravia in a lower-class family. He initially worked as kitchen helper at the Jesuit school at Český Krumlov, but was eventually admitted to the Krumlov Jesuit Seminary of poor students in 1590. Sinapius eventually graduated from the Krumlov Gymnasium, where he studied poetry and rhetoric, and became a pharmacist himself. There he also worked in the college's pharmacy, on topics involving chemistry and herbalism, under the overseeing of Martin Schaffner (1564–1608).

By 1598, he started studying Aristotelian philosophy at the Clementinum college in Prague (which was later merged with Charles University), and at the same time oversaw the kitchen and pantry, but continued working in chemistry and pharmacy. However, Sinapius was not satisfied with the teachings there, musing over Barbara Celarent, instead of studying physics and the origins of nature. Because his herbal skills to treat illness impressed, he was allowed gardening near the river Vltava, under the Bräke. Here he grew herbs and set up a laboratory at Smíchov (then a village behind Prague walls), the Clementinum's botanical garden. There, or at the garden, he distilled a very popular aqua sinapis (German: sinapischen Wasser, both lit. 'mustard water', perhaps in reference to his own name) whose sale made him a wealthy man.

In 1600, he became the administrator of the Jesuit college in Jindřichův Hradec, and in 1606 he became capitaneus and administrator of the properties of the St. George's Convent in the Prague Castle. In 1607 he was named imperial chemist by Emperor Rudolf II. In return for curing the emperor of a grave disease, he was ennobled with the title "de Tepenec", presumably after the medieval Tepenec Castle (destroyed in 1391) near Olomouc. He lent Rudolf II money and received from him in return an estate around town Mělník. He also supported students of the studies of Catholic theology financially.

In the religious disputes of the early 17th century, Sinapius strongly defended the Catholic side. He became the administrator of the Mělník Castle but was jailed in 1620, when the Protestants took charge of the town. Subsequently, was exchanged for another prisoner (the famous physician Jesenius) and exiled, but later, after the failure of the Bohemian Revolt, he returned to Mělník and lived there the rest of his life.

He died in 1622, from a horse-fall that he had suffered a year before. Two days before his death he was moved to the Clementinum in the care of the Jesuits, and left them the sum of 50,000 gold coins and his Mělník estate. He is buried in the Church of St. Salvator in the Clementinum.

== Writings ==
In 1609 Sinapius published a pro-Catholic pamphlet which saw several reprintings. According to a 1777 source, he had written several manuscripts on chemistry and botany.

== Connection to the Voynich manuscript ==
Book dealer Wilfrid Voynich saw Sinapius's name and title at the bottom of the first page of the Voynich manuscript. Voynich saw the faint writing and subsequently used chemicals to make it clearer but failed. It was later revealed by ultraviolet light to be Sinapius's signature and has been compared with other samples. Sinapius is thus the second person speculated to have owned the Voynich manuscript after Emperor Rudolf II. Its attested provenance begins with him, since the story that it was owned by Emperor Rudolf II rests on a single piece of unsubstantiated hearsay, related second hand in a letter to Athanasius Kircher.
