= Bořenovice =

- Municipality
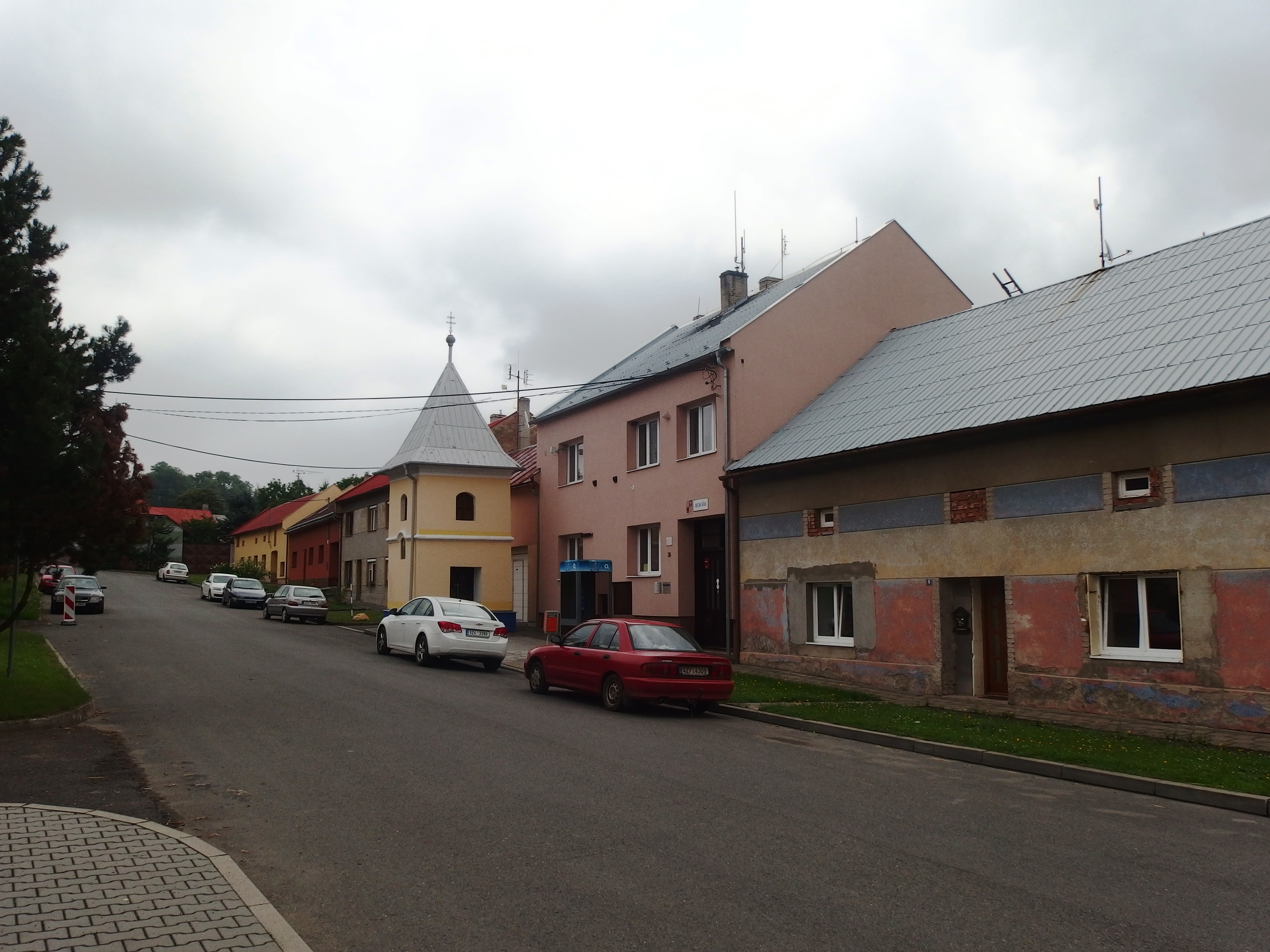
- Centre of Bořenovice with municipal office and belfry

- Flag Coat of arms

- Location in the Czech Republic
- Coordinates: 49°21′41″N 17°33′52″E
- Country: Czech Republic
- Region: Zlín
- District: Kroměříž
- First mentioned: 1371

Area
  - Total: 1.62 km^{2} (0.63 sq mi)
- Elevation: 250 m (820 ft)

Population (2026-01-01)
  - Total: 205
  - Density: 127/km^{2} (328/sq mi)
- Time zone: UTC+1 (CET)
  - Summer (DST): UTC+2 (CEST)
- Postal code: 769 01
- Website: www.borenovice.cz

Bořenovice is a municipality and village in Kroměříž District in the Zlín Region of the Czech Republic. It has about 200 inhabitants.

Bořenovice lies approximately 15 kilometres (9 mi) north-east of Kroměříž, 16 km (10 mi) north-west of Zlín, and 241 km (150 mi) east of Prague.

== Demographics ==
Historical population
Year	Pop.	±%
1869	183	—
1880	221	+20.8%
1890	205	−7.2%
1900	249	+21.5%
1910	302	+21.3%
1921	297	−1.7%
1930	266	−10.4%
1950	265	−0.4%
1961	291	+9.8%
1970	250	−14.1%
1980	196	−21.6%
1991	167	−14.8%
2001	160	−4.2%
2011	177	+10.6%
2021	200	+13.0%
Source: Censuses

== Notable people ==
- Jacobus Sinapius (1575–1622), pharmacist and physician
