= Hluchov =

- Municipality
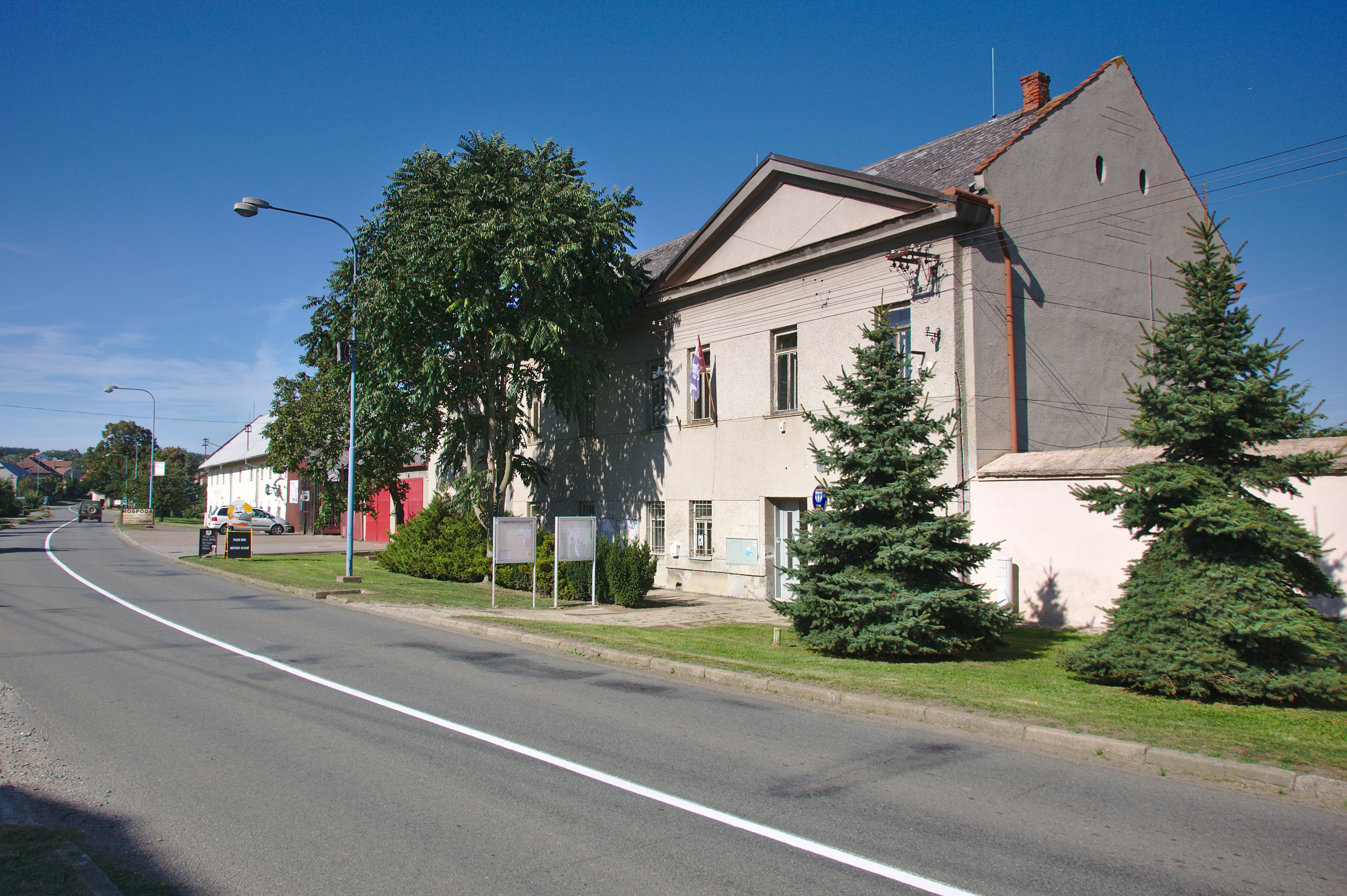
- Municipal office

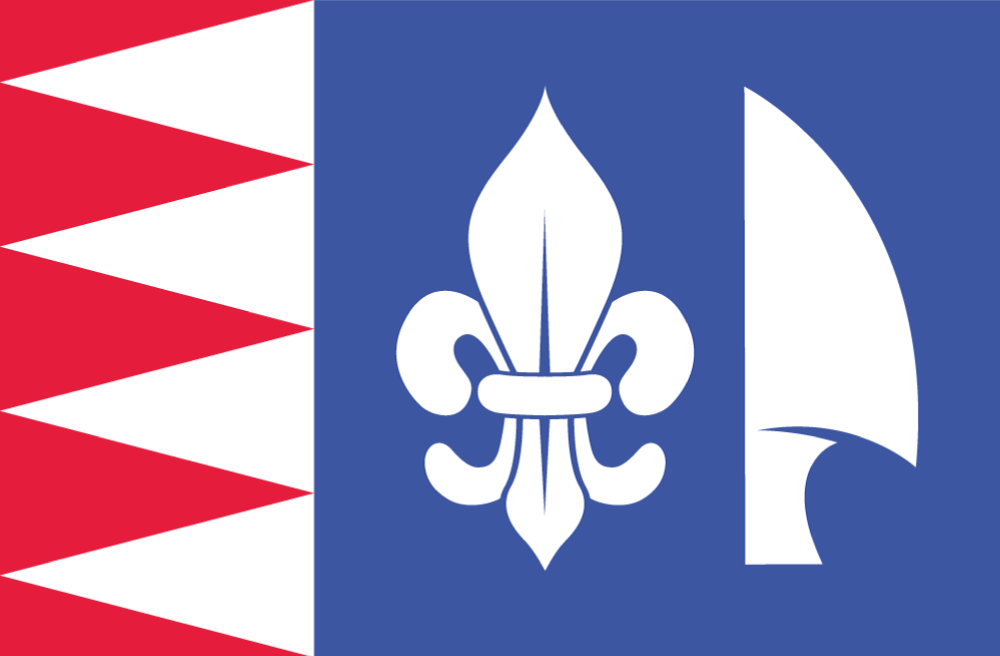
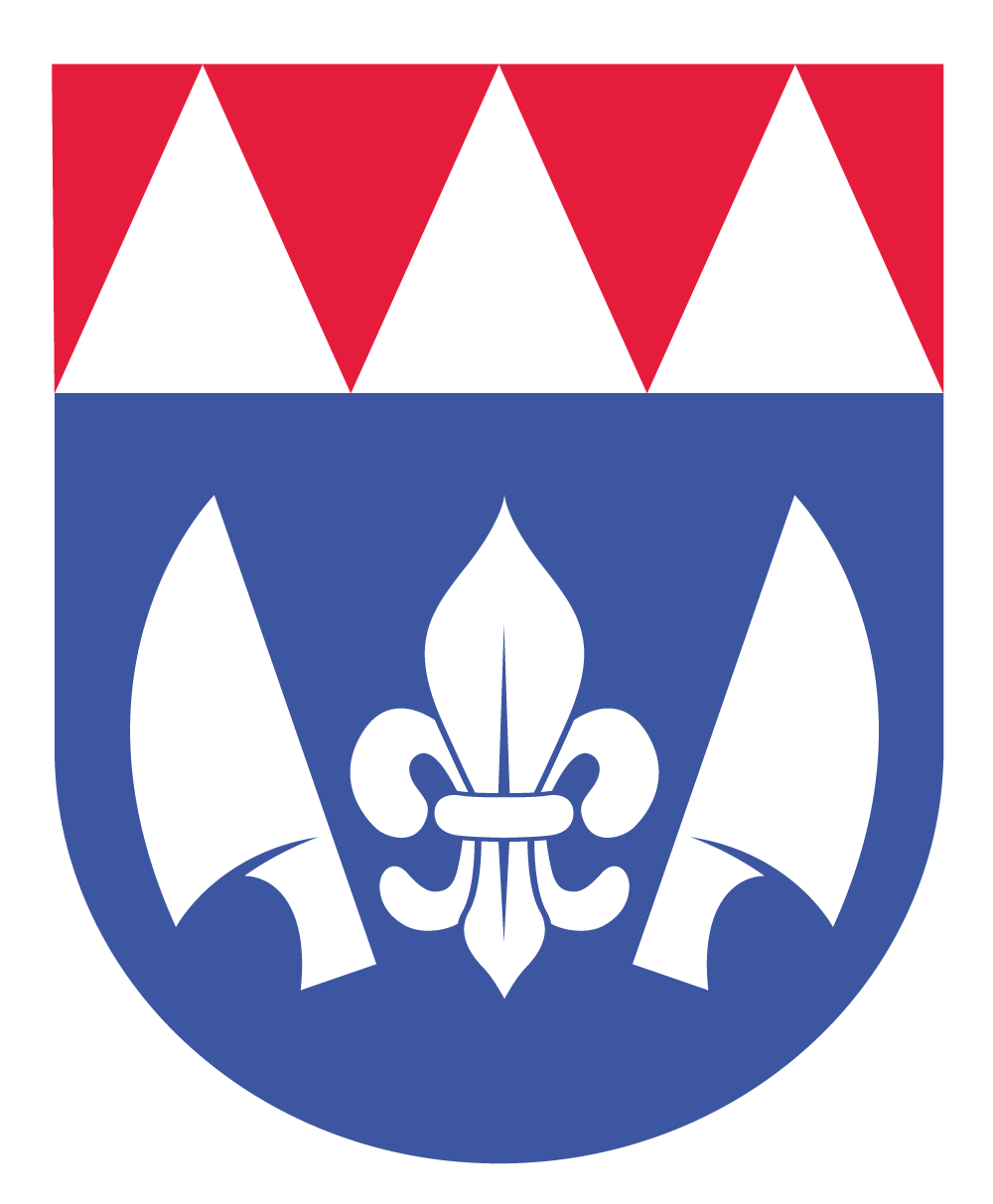
- Flag Coat of arms

- Location in the Czech Republic
- Coordinates: 49°32′29″N 16°59′48″E
- Country: Czech Republic
- Region: Olomouc
- District: Prostějov
- First mentioned: 1141

Area
  - Total: 5.38 km^{2} (2.08 sq mi)
- Elevation: 324 m (1,063 ft)

Population (2026-01-01)
  - Total: 335
  - Density: 62.3/km^{2} (161/sq mi)
- Time zone: UTC+1 (CET)
  - Summer (DST): UTC+2 (CEST)
- Postal code: 798 41
- Website: www.hluchov.cz

Hluchov is a municipality and village in Prostějov District in the Olomouc Region of the Czech Republic. It has about 300 inhabitants.

Hluchov lies approximately 12 kilometres (7 mi) north-west of Prostějov, 20 km (12 mi) west of Olomouc, and 195 km (121 mi) east of Prague.

== Demographics ==
Historical population
Year	Pop.	±%
1869	463	—
1880	497	+7.3%
1890	559	+12.5%
1900	540	−3.4%
1910	551	+2.0%
1921	568	+3.1%
1930	599	+5.5%
1950	486	−18.9%
1961	455	−6.4%
1970	417	−8.4%
1980	375	−10.1%
1991	311	−17.1%
2001	335	+7.7%
2011	329	−1.8%
2021	320	−2.7%
Source: Censuses
