= Martin Hugo Schaffner =

Swiss entrepreneur

- Born: February 23, 1923; Switzerland
- Died: October 5, 1965 (aged 42)
- Other names: Bomber-Schaffner
- Occupation: Entrepreneur
- Known for: Recovering aircraft from Lake Zug

Martin Hugo Schaffner (23 February 1923 – 5 October 1965) was a Swiss entrepreneur. Schaffner was involved in the lifting of aircraft and ships in Switzerland and became known as "Bomber-Schaffner" after he raised a bomber from Lake Zug within two months in 1952.

== Childhood and youth ==
Schaffner was the youngest of four children. His father, a foreman in a shoe factory, fell seriously ill while Schaffner and his three siblings were still in school. As a result, Schaffner's mother had to support the family. During his school years, Schaffner built a motorcycle from parts of various brands.

As he had to contribute to the family's livelihood at an early age, he took a job as a helper in a motorcycle repair shop in 1938.

== Career path ==
In the early years of World War II, Schaffner recognized the economic necessity of collecting and recycling scrap materials, leading him to establish his first company in 1941 at the age of eighteen. To facilitate this, his mother applied for his legal emancipation. Initially, he used a handcart pulled by a dog, later upgrading to a bicycle and eventually a motorcycle with a sidecar.

After the war, Schaffner repaired and sold vehicles. In 1948, he acquired a plot of land in Suhr, Aargau, where he built a car service station with a petrol station. Over the following years, he expanded this business and opened five additional petrol stations. Schaffner became known for selling petrol at lower prices than his competitors, sparking competition among providers. As a result, suppliers ceased deliveries to him. In response, Schaffner founded his own transport company with several lorries and supplied his own petrol stations as well as others'.

Inspired by an American magazine featuring a sports aircraft on the cover, Schaffner decided to adorn his petrol station in Suhr with a bomber from the US Air Force. As there were no bombers available for purchase in Switzerland, he and his brother Peter went to the US Air Force base at Frankfurt Airport in 1950. The Americans were unwilling to sell Schaffner any military equipment but granted him permission to recover aircraft that had crashed in Switzerland during World War II. Following this, he founded a diving and recovery company and undertook the lifting of a Boeing B-17 bomber from 1944 that had made an emergency landing in Lake Zug. After two years of preparation, the 22.5-meter-long bomber was lifted on 25 August 1952, by a group of up to 30 people from a depth of 45 meters. This recovery made Schaffner known nationwide as the "Bomber-Schaffner." The bomber was displayed in various Swiss cities and subsequently served as a focal point for Schaffner's petrol station in Suhr.

In the following years, Schaffner salvaged additional aircraft and ships out of lakes: among them was another Boeing B-17 bomber salvaged from Greifensee in 1953, which was then displayed in Maur for public viewing, as well as a British Avro Lancaster salvaged from Lake Untersee in 1954, which was exhibited for visitors in Steckborn. From Lake Constance, he recovered two experimental P-16 aircraft, a Vampire from the Swiss Air Force, a Swissair DC-3, two ships, and several other aircraft near Friedrichshafen.

== Private ==
Schaffner was overweight and therefore underwent a weight reduction surgery in October 1965. He died on 5 October 1965, as a result of complications from the procedure.

== Literature ==
- Martin „Bomber“ Schaffner. Egger, Dani (2018): 1939–1945 – fremde Flugzeuge in der Schweiz: Landungen und Abstürze. Widnau, Switzerland: Warbird. pp. 272. ISBN 978-3-033-06824-7
- Wilhelm, Jean-Pierre; Thomas, Roy (1995): Fishing for fortresses: the Bomber Schaffner story. pp. 19–23.
- Schaffner, Martin (1952): USA Bomber nach 8 Jahren dem Seegrund entrissen.
