= Veselíčko (Přerov District) =

- Municipality
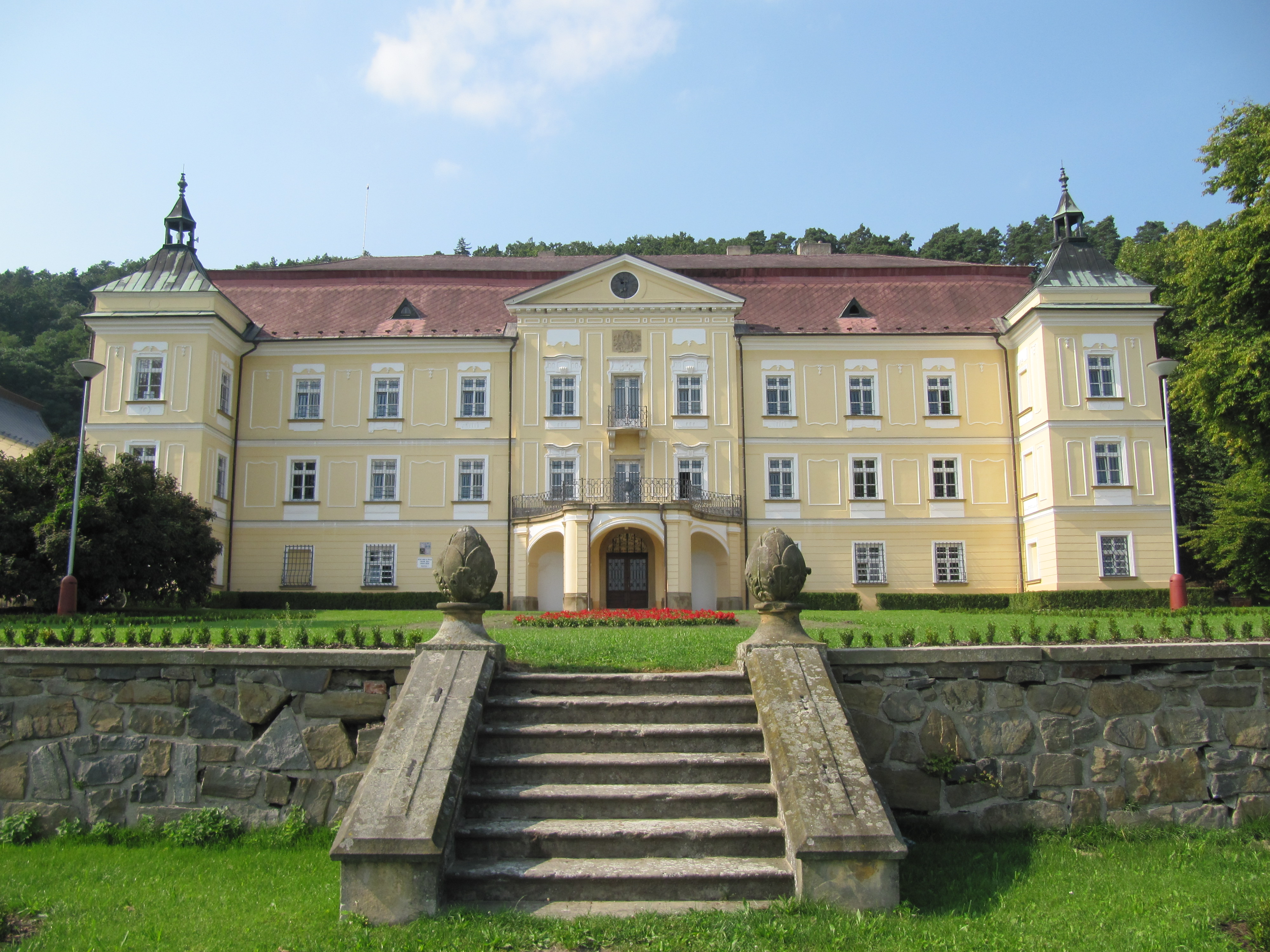
- Veselíčko Castle

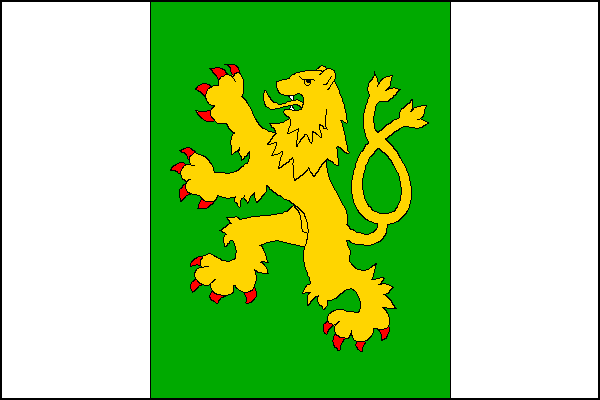
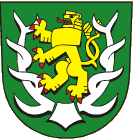
- Flag Coat of arms

- Location in the Czech Republic
- Coordinates: 49°31′56″N 17°30′33″E
- Country: Czech Republic
- Region: Olomouc
- District: Přerov
- First mentioned: 1275

Area
  - Total: 13.17 km^{2} (5.08 sq mi)
- Elevation: 276 m (906 ft)

Population (2026-01-01)
  - Total: 922
  - Density: 70.0/km^{2} (181/sq mi)
- Time zone: UTC+1 (CET)
  - Summer (DST): UTC+2 (CEST)
- Postal code: 751 25
- Website: obec-veselicko.cz

Veselíčko is a municipality and village in Přerov District in the Olomouc Region of the Czech Republic. It has about 900 inhabitants.

Veselíčko lies approximately 10 kilometres (6 mi) north-east of Přerov, 20 km (12 mi) east of Olomouc, and 230 km (140 mi) east of Prague.

== Administrative division ==
Veselíčko consists of two municipal parts (in brackets population according to the 2021 census):

- Veselíčko (712)
- Tupec (148)

== History ==
The first written mention of Veselíčko is from 1275.

== Demographics ==
Historical population
Year	Pop.	±%
1869	1,124	—
1880	1,089	−3.1%
1890	1,093	+0.4%
1900	996	−8.9%
1910	1,033	+3.7%
1921	1,011	−2.1%
1930	1,066	+5.4%
1950	954	−10.5%
1961	990	+3.8%
1970	914	−7.7%
1980	835	−8.6%
1991	815	−2.4%
2001	834	+2.3%
2011	839	+0.6%
2021	860	+2.5%
Source: Censuses
