= Přestavlky (Přerov District) =

- Municipality
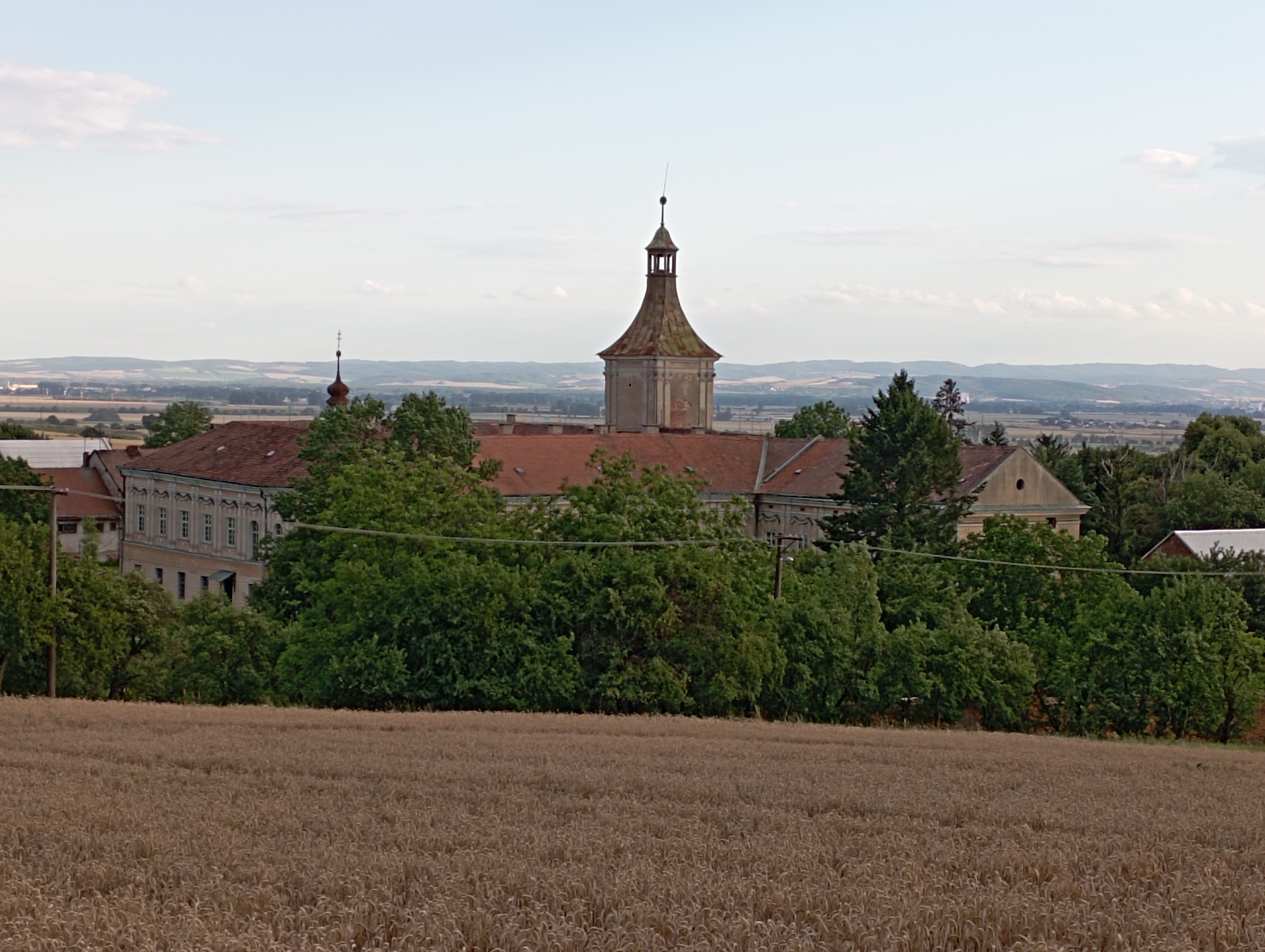
- Přestavlky Castle

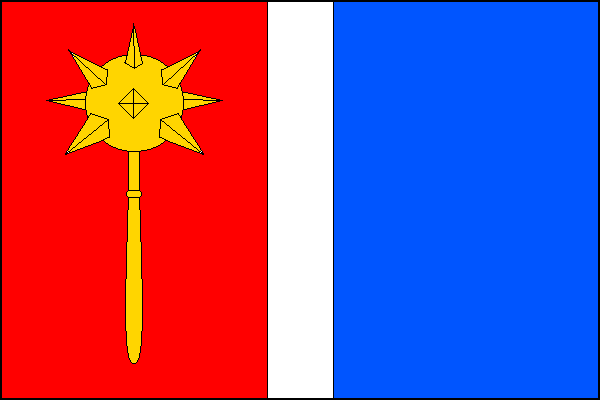
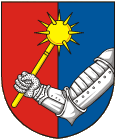
- Flag Coat of arms

- Location in the Czech Republic
- Coordinates: 49°23′25″N 17°28′54″E
- Country: Czech Republic
- Region: Olomouc
- District: Přerov
- First mentioned: 1275

Area
  - Total: 3.63 km^{2} (1.40 sq mi)
- Elevation: 275 m (902 ft)

Population (2026-01-01)
  - Total: 254
  - Density: 70.0/km^{2} (181/sq mi)
- Time zone: UTC+1 (CET)
  - Summer (DST): UTC+2 (CEST)
- Postal code: 750 02
- Website: www.prestavlkyuprerova.cz

Přestavlky is a municipality and village in Přerov District in the Olomouc Region of the Czech Republic. It has about 300 inhabitants.

Přestavlky lies approximately 8 kilometres (5 mi) south of Přerov, 28 km (17 mi) south-east of Olomouc, and 233 km (145 mi) east of Prague.

== Demographics ==
Historical population
Year	Pop.	±%
1869	415	—
1880	512	+23.4%
1890	497	−2.9%
1900	498	+0.2%
1910	530	+6.4%
1921	538	+1.5%
1930	545	+1.3%
1950	414	−24.0%
1961	395	−4.6%
1970	329	−16.7%
1980	301	−8.5%
1991	263	−12.6%
2001	255	−3.0%
2011	255	+0.0%
2021	255	+0.0%
Source: Censuses
