= Přemyslovice =

- Municipality
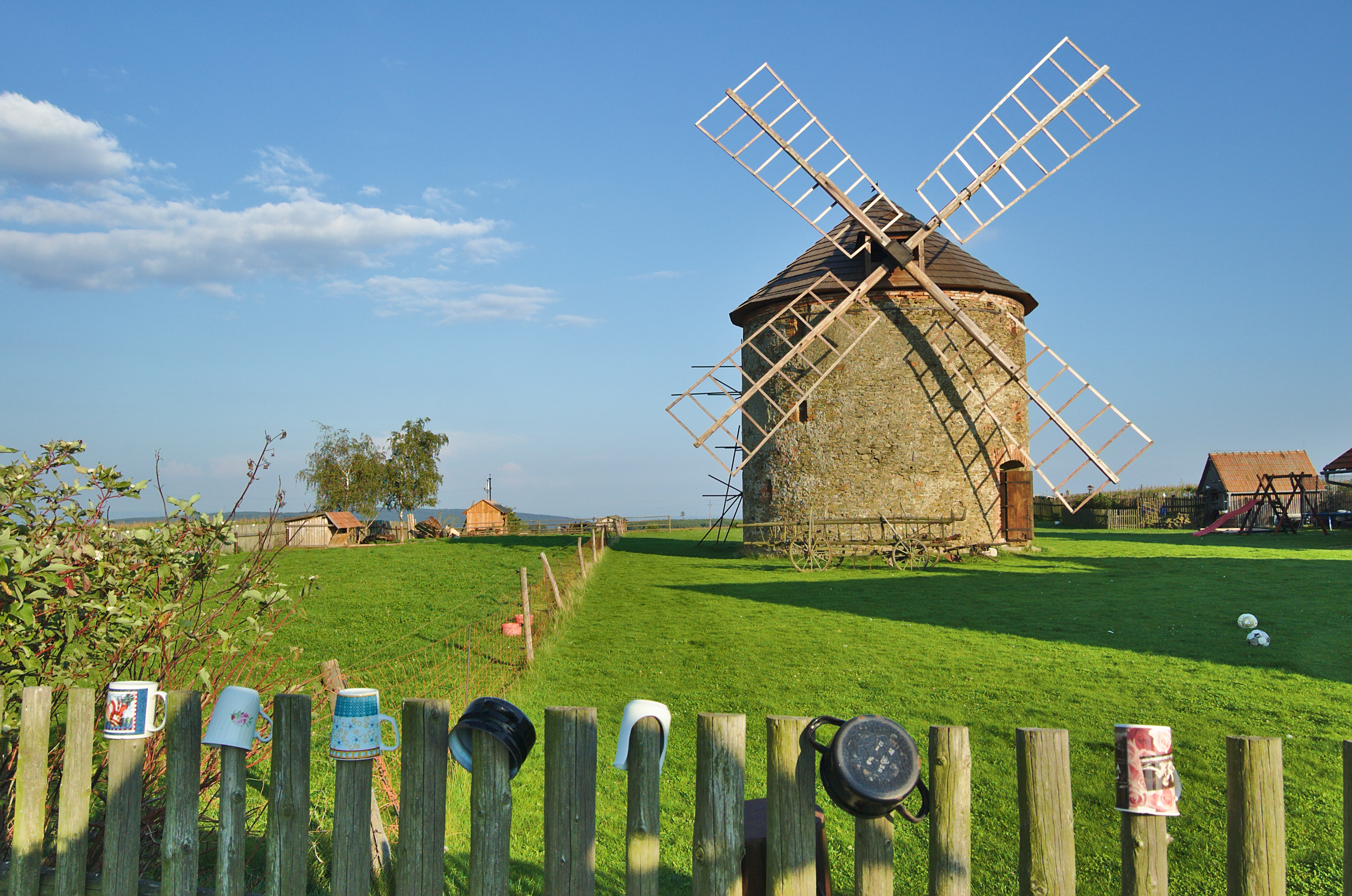
- Windmill in Přemyslovice

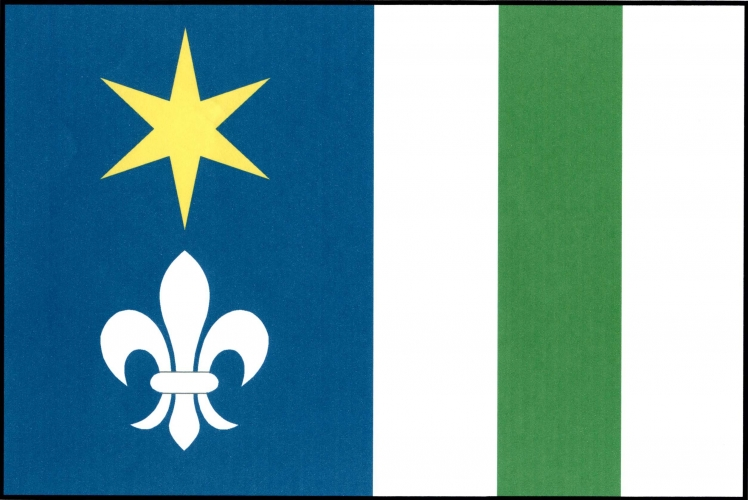
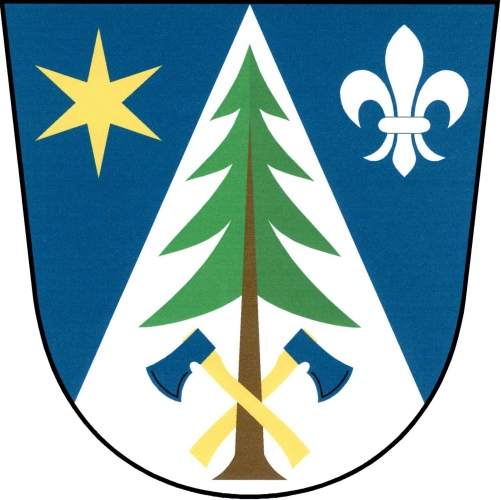
- Flag Coat of arms

- Location in the Czech Republic
- Coordinates: 49°33′23″N 16°57′21″E
- Country: Czech Republic
- Region: Olomouc
- District: Prostějov
- First mentioned: 1309

Area
  - Total: 18.06 km^{2} (6.97 sq mi)
- Elevation: 395 m (1,296 ft)

Population (2026-01-01)
  - Total: 1,200
  - Density: 66/km^{2} (170/sq mi)
- Time zone: UTC+1 (CET)
  - Summer (DST): UTC+2 (CEST)
- Postal codes: 798 51, 798 52
- Website: www.obecpremyslovice.cz

Přemyslovice is a municipality and village in Prostějov District in the Olomouc Region of the Czech Republic. It has about 1,200 inhabitants.

Přemyslovice lies approximately 15 kilometres (9 mi) north-west of Prostějov, 22 km (14 mi) west of Olomouc, and 192 km (119 mi) east of Prague.

== Administrative division ==
Přemyslovice consists of two municipal parts (in brackets population according to the 2021 census):

- Přemyslovice (1,073)
- Štarnov (128)

== Demographics ==
Historical population
Year	Pop.	±%
1869	1,624	—
1880	1,673	+3.0%
1890	1,673	+0.0%
1900	1,604	−4.1%
1910	1,720	+7.2%
1921	1,644	−4.4%
1930	1,809	+10.0%
1950	1,565	−13.5%
1961	1,560	−0.3%
1970	1,519	−2.6%
1980	1,415	−6.8%
1991	1,318	−6.9%
2001	1,270	−3.6%
2011	1,272	+0.2%
2021	1,201	−5.6%
Source: Censuses
