= Martin Schaffner (pharmacist) =

Bohemian pharmacist and chemist

Martin Schaffner (~1564–1608) was a Bohemian pharmacist and chemist at the Jesuit college in Český Krumlov.

He was born in Olomouc, around 1564, and died in Krumlov in 1608. He is mentioned in Johannes Schmidl's chronicles of the Jesuits as a competent pharmacist and tutor to Jacobus Sinapius.
