= Doloplazy (Olomouc District) =

- Municipality
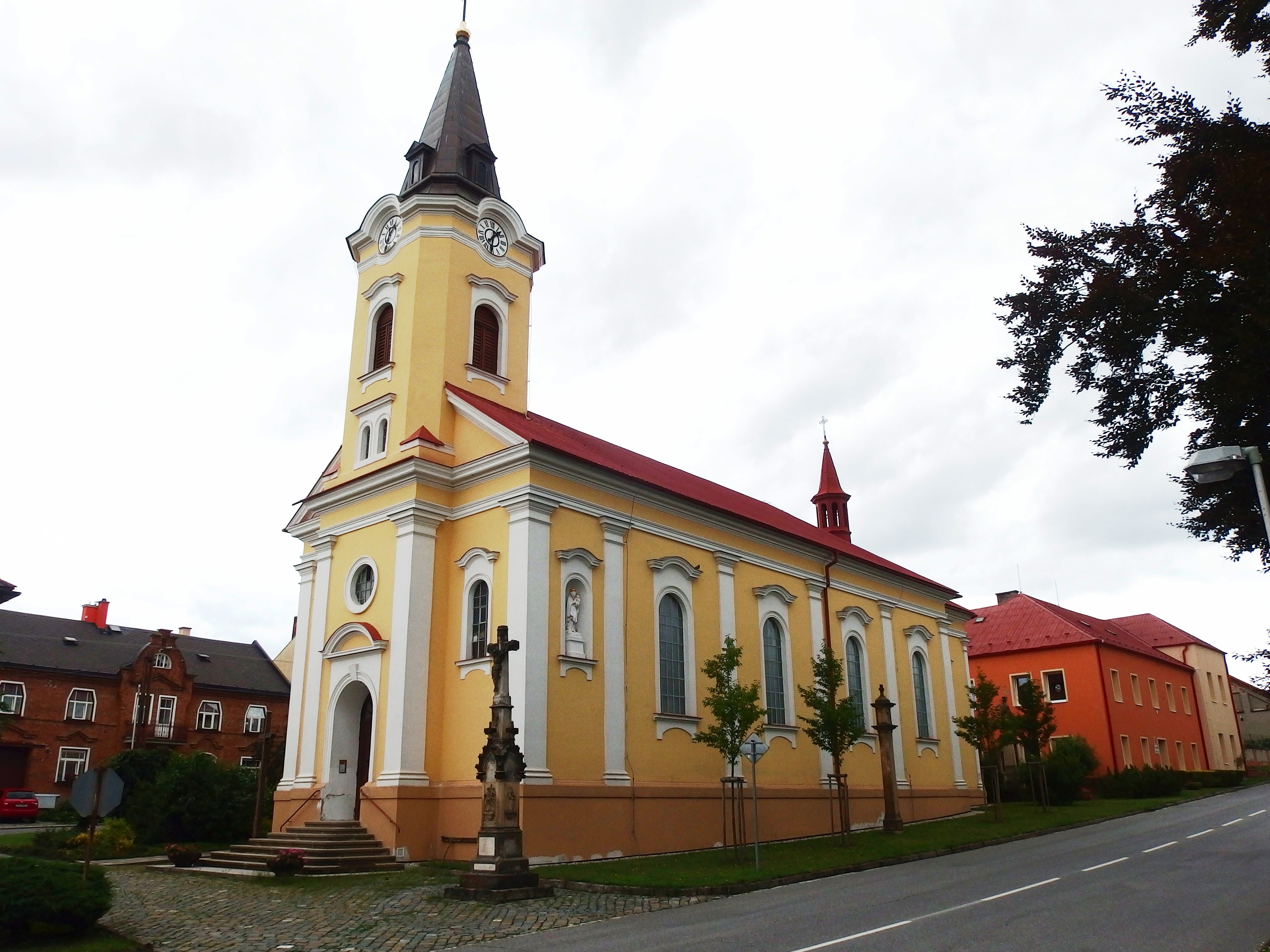
- Church of Saints Cyril and Methodius

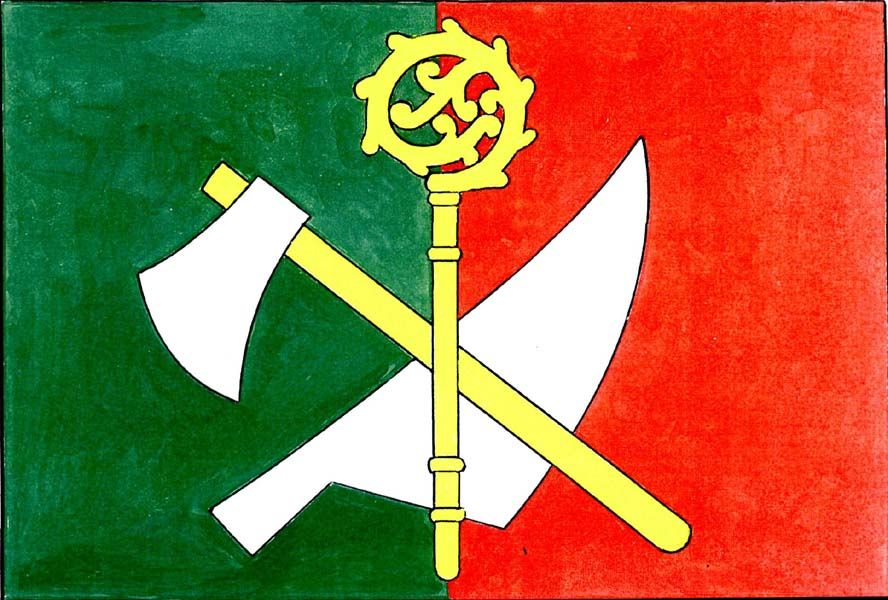
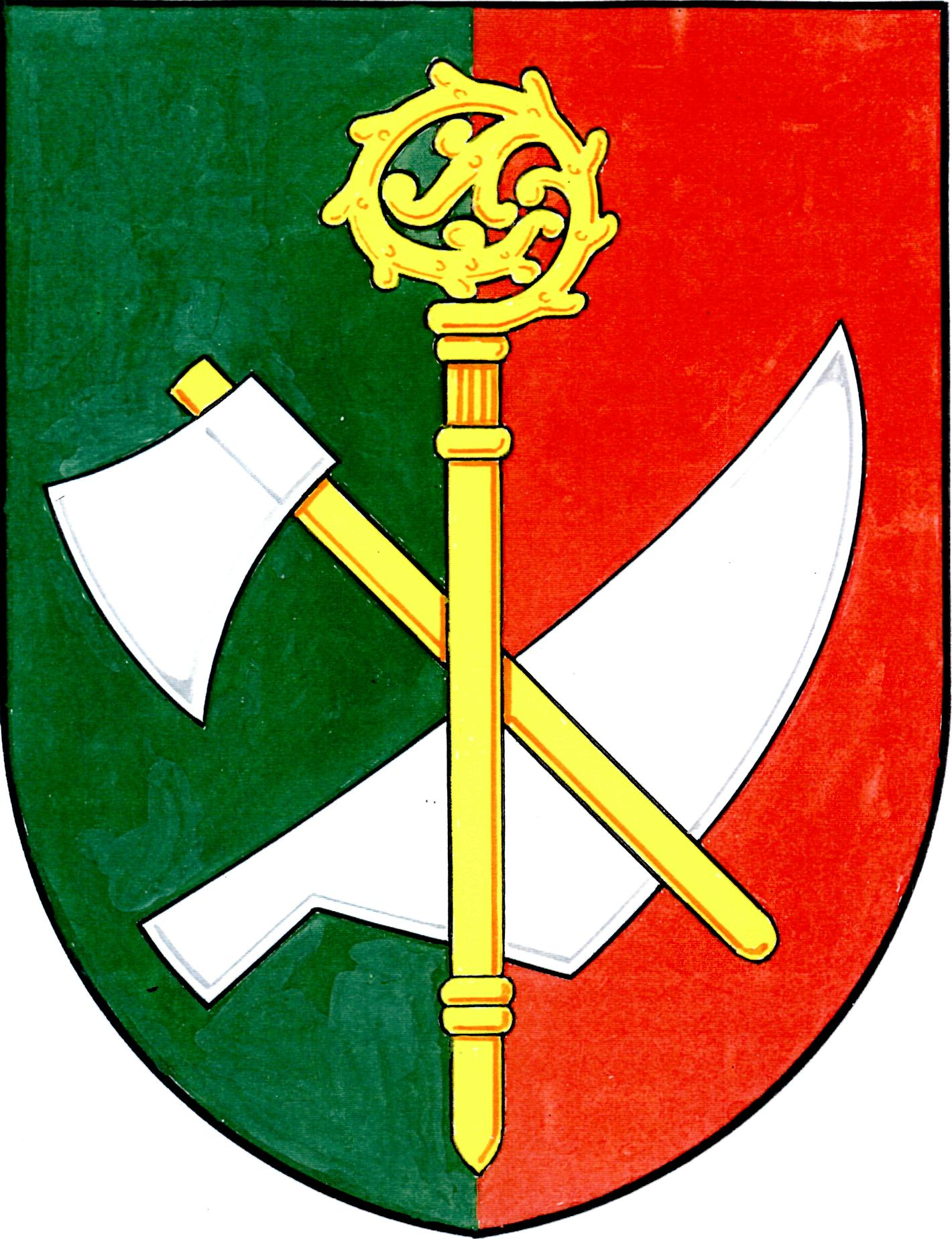
- Flag Coat of arms

- Location in the Czech Republic
- Coordinates: 49°34′2″N 17°24′41″E
- Country: Czech Republic
- Region: Olomouc
- District: Olomouc
- First mentioned: 1233

Area
  - Total: 8.04 km^{2} (3.10 sq mi)
- Elevation: 298 m (978 ft)

Population (2026-01-01)
  - Total: 1,307
  - Density: 163/km^{2} (421/sq mi)
- Time zone: UTC+1 (CET)
  - Summer (DST): UTC+2 (CEST)
- Postal code: 783 56
- Website: doloplazy.cz

Doloplazy is a municipality and village in Olomouc District in the Olomouc Region of the Czech Republic. It has about 1,300 inhabitants.

Doloplazy lies approximately 13 kilometres (8 mi) east of Olomouc and 223 km (139 mi) east of Prague.

== Demographics ==
Historical population
Year	Pop.	±%
1869	898	—
1880	864	−3.8%
1890	886	+2.5%
1900	940	+6.1%
1910	1,101	+17.1%
1921	1,112	+1.0%
1930	1,111	−0.1%
1950	992	−10.7%
1961	1,066	+7.5%
1970	1,095	+2.7%
1980	1,045	−4.6%
1991	1,108	+6.0%
2001	1,199	+8.2%
2011	1,317	+9.8%
2021	1,293	−1.8%
Source: Censuses
