= Polkovice =

- Municipality
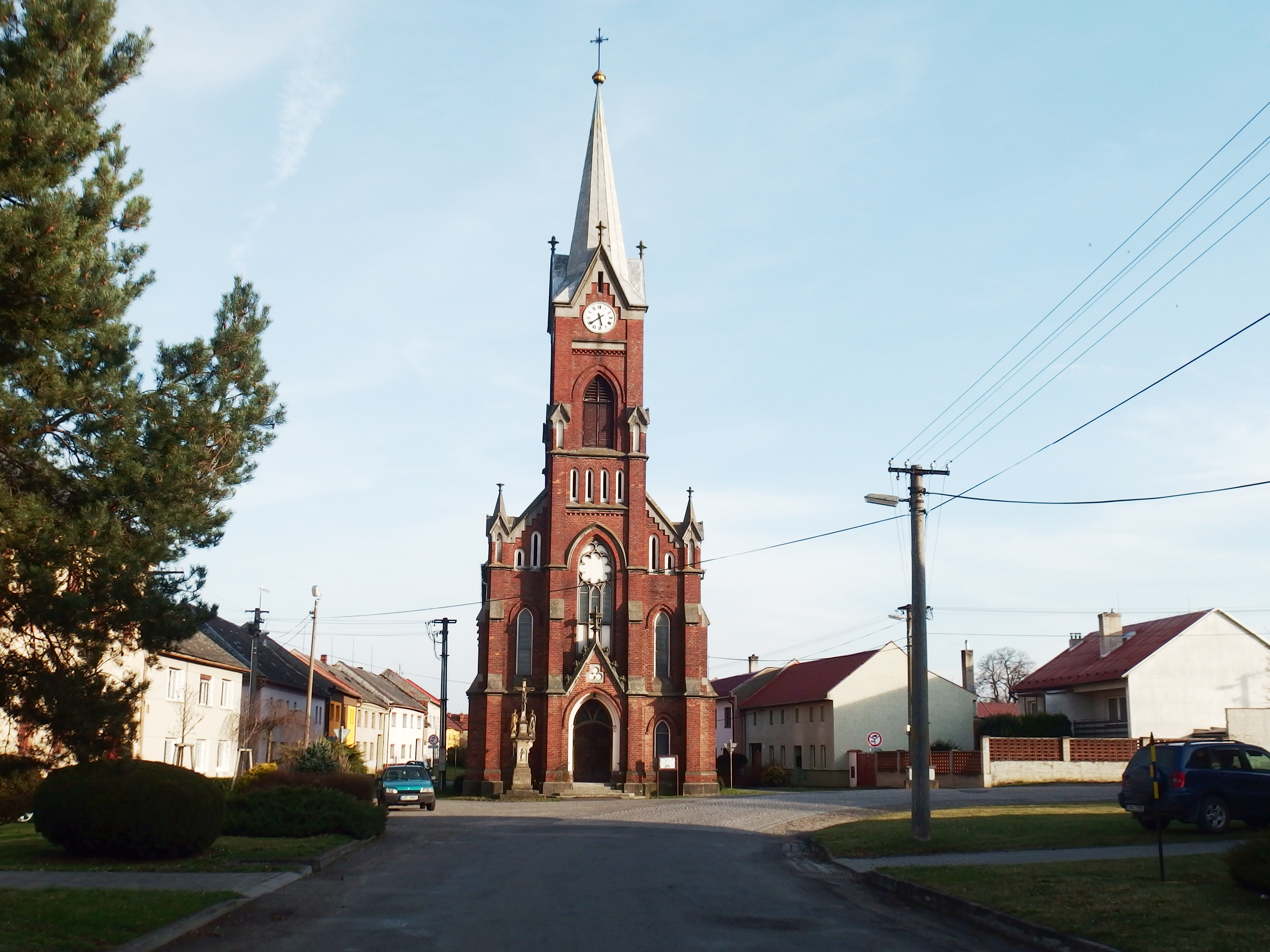
- Church of Saint Bartholomew

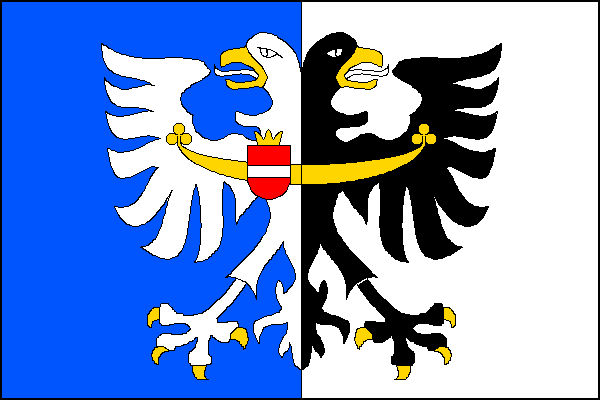
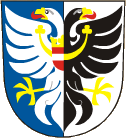
- Flag Coat of arms

- Location in the Czech Republic
- Coordinates: 49°23′30″N 17°15′33″E
- Country: Czech Republic
- Region: Olomouc
- District: Přerov
- First mentioned: 1275

Area
  - Total: 7.06 km^{2} (2.73 sq mi)
- Elevation: 199 m (653 ft)

Population (2026-01-01)
  - Total: 511
  - Density: 72.4/km^{2} (187/sq mi)
- Time zone: UTC+1 (CET)
  - Summer (DST): UTC+2 (CEST)
- Postal code: 751 44
- Website: www.polkovice.cz

Polkovice is a municipality and village in Přerov District in the Olomouc Region of the Czech Republic. It has about 500 inhabitants.

Polkovice lies approximately 16 kilometres (10 mi) south-west of Přerov, 23 km (14 mi) south of Olomouc, and 219 km (136 mi) east of Prague.

== Demographics ==
Historical population
| Year | Pop. | ±% |
|---|---|---|
| 1869 | 662 | — |
| 1880 | 617 | −6.8% |
| 1890 | 638 | +3.4% |
| 1900 | 672 | +5.3% |
| 1910 | 685 | +1.9% |
| 1921 | 716 | +4.5% |
| 1930 | 706 | −1.4% |
| 1950 | 606 | −14.2% |
| 1961 | 623 | +2.8% |
| 1970 | 558 | −10.4% |
| 1980 | 531 | −4.8% |
| 1991 | 483 | −9.0% |
| 2001 | 486 | +0.6% |
| 2011 | 492 | +1.2% |
| 2021 | 485 | −1.4% |
Source: Censuses
