= Velký Týnec =

- Municipality
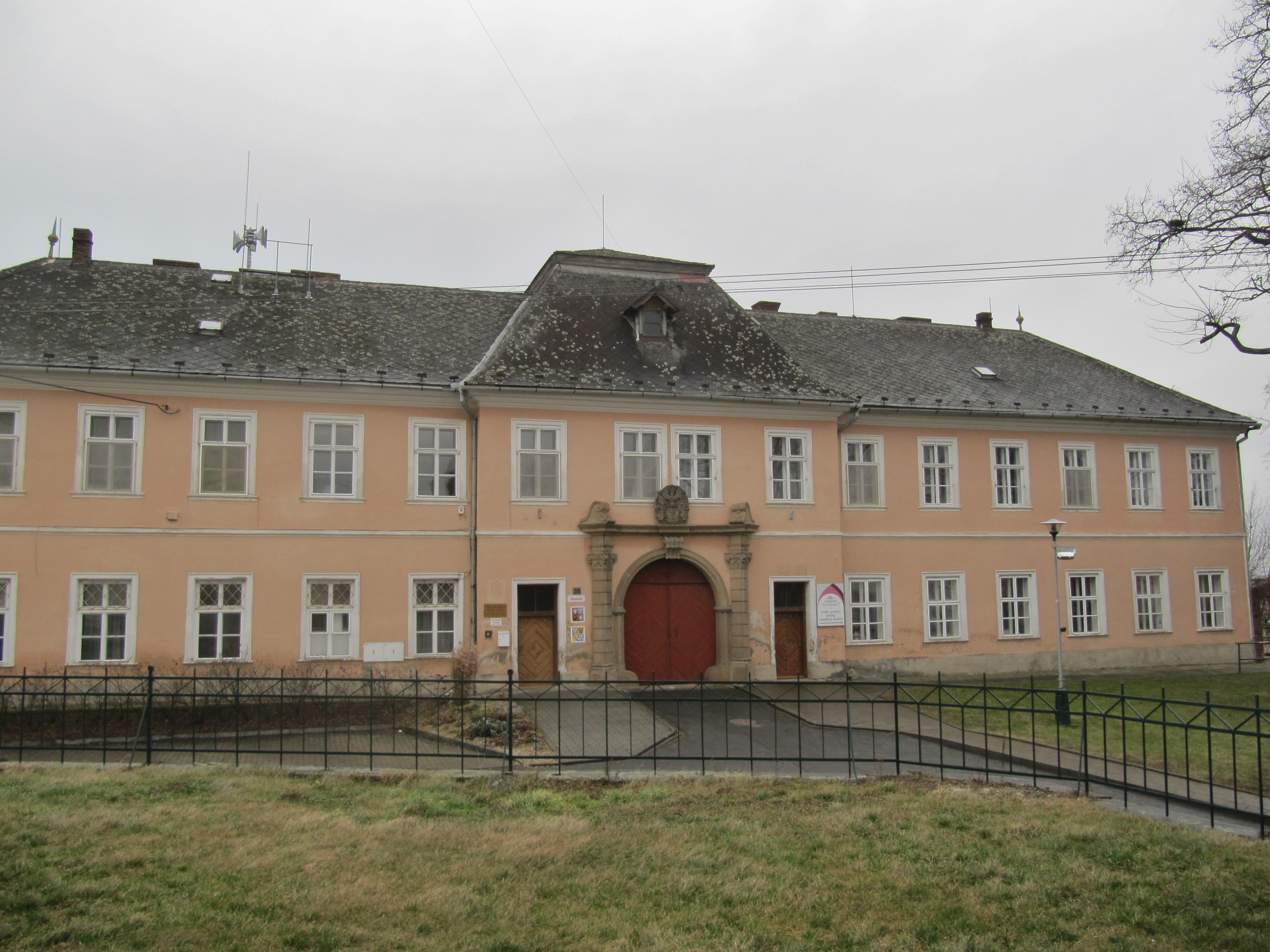
- Velký Týnec Castle

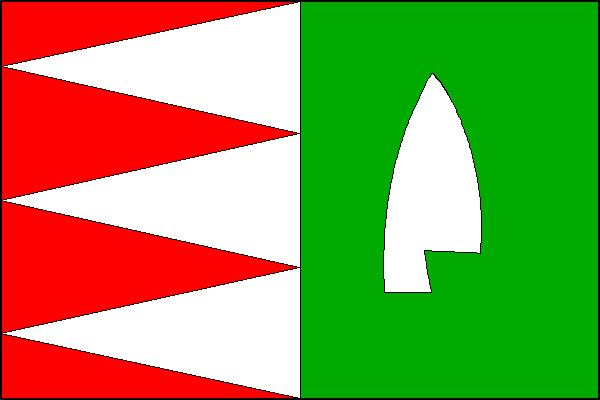
- Flag Coat of arms

- Location in the Czech Republic
- Coordinates: 49°33′7″N 17°20′15″E
- Country: Czech Republic
- Region: Olomouc
- District: Olomouc
- First mentioned: 1207

Area
  - Total: 20.62 km^{2} (7.96 sq mi)
- Elevation: 244 m (801 ft)

Population (2026-01-01)
  - Total: 3,211
  - Density: 155.7/km^{2} (403.3/sq mi)
- Time zone: UTC+1 (CET)
  - Summer (DST): UTC+2 (CEST)
- Postal code: 783 72
- Website: www.velkytynec.cz

Velký Týnec (Czech pronunciation: [ˈvɛlkiː ˈtiːnɛts]) is a municipality and village in Olomouc District in the Olomouc Region of the Czech Republic. It has about 3,200 inhabitants.

== Administrative division ==
Velký Týnec consists of three municipal parts (in brackets population according to the 2021 census):

- Velký Týnec (2,341)
- Čechovice (345)
- Vsisko (349)

== Geography ==
Velký Týnec is located about 6 kilometres (4 mi) southeast of Olomouc. It lies on the border between the Upper Morava Valley and Nízký Jeseník range. The highest point is the hill Chlum at 344 m (1,129 ft) above sea level. The Týnečka Stream flows through the municipality.

== History ==
The first written mention of Velký Týnec is in a deed of King Ottokar I from 1207. From 1361 until the establishment of an independent municipality in 1848, the village was owned by the metropolitan chapter of Olomouc.

== Demographics ==
Historical population

Year	Pop.	±%
1869	1,775	—
1880	1,923	+8.3%
1890	2,057	+7.0%
1900	2,204	+7.1%
1910	2,432	+10.3%

Year	Pop.	±%
1921	2,396	−1.5%
1930	2,567	+7.1%
1950	2,350	−8.5%
1961	2,393	+1.8%
1970	2,211	−7.6%

Year	Pop.	±%
1980	2,149	−2.8%
1991	2,063	−4.0%
2001	2,122	+2.9%
2011	2,560	+20.6%
2021	3,035	+18.6%

Source: Censuses

== Transport ==
Velký Týnec is located at the crossroads of the D35 motorway, which connects Olomouc with the D1 motorway, and the I/55 road from Olomouc to Přerov.

== Sights ==
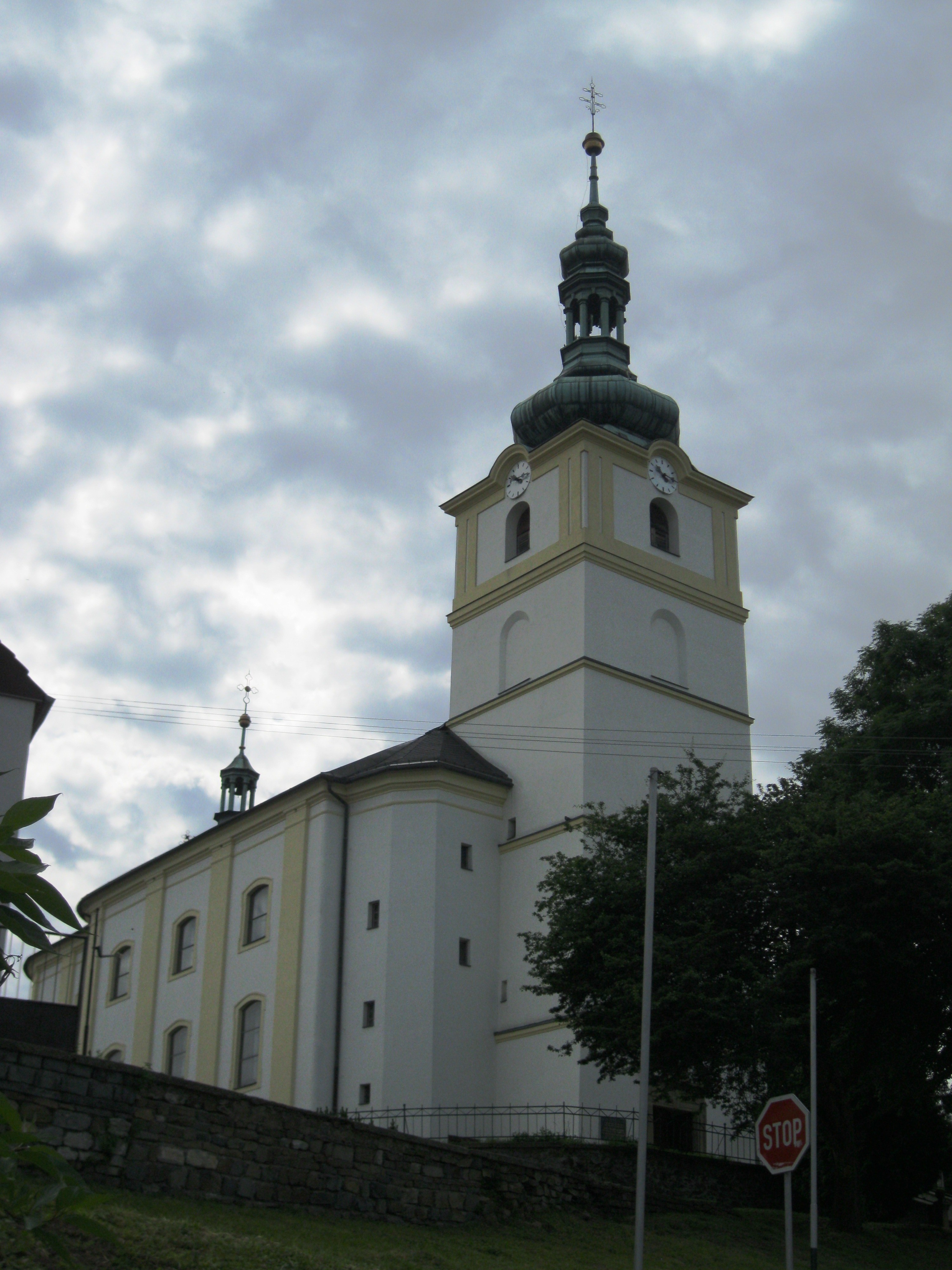
Church of the Assumption of the Virgin Mary

The main landmark of Velký Týnec is the Church of the Assumption of the Virgin Mary. It was built in the Baroque style in 1751–1760.

The Velký Týnec Castle is a Baroque manor house, built on the site of an older fortress in 1765–1767. Today it houses the municipal office and a library.
