= Líšnice (Šumperk District) =

- Municipality
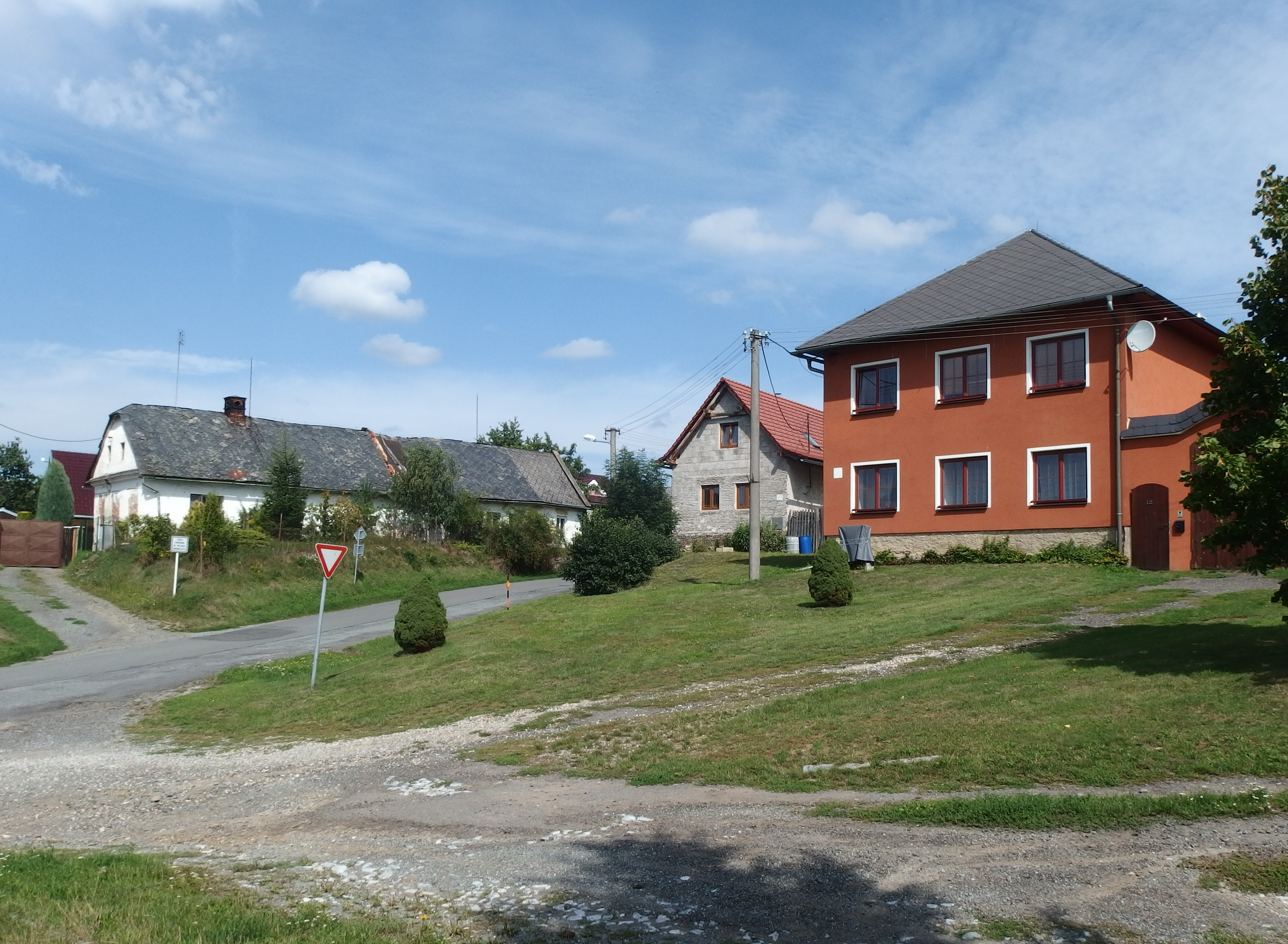
- Centre of Líšnice

- Flag

- Location in the Czech Republic
- Coordinates: 49°45′21″N 16°52′34″E
- Country: Czech Republic
- Region: Olomouc
- District: Šumperk
- First mentioned: 1348

Area
  - Total: 9.74 km^{2} (3.76 sq mi)
- Elevation: 320 m (1,050 ft)

Population (2026-01-01)
  - Total: 421
  - Density: 43.2/km^{2} (112/sq mi)
- Time zone: UTC+1 (CET)
  - Summer (DST): UTC+2 (CEST)
- Postal codes: 789 85
- Website: www.obec-lisnice.cz

Líšnice (German: Lexen) is a municipality and village in Šumperk District in the Olomouc Region of the Czech Republic. It has about 400 inhabitants.

Líšnice lies approximately 24 kilometres (15 mi) south of Šumperk, 35 km (22 mi) north-west of Olomouc, and 178 km (111 mi) east of Prague.

== Administrative division ==
Líšnice consists of two municipal parts (in brackets population according to the 2021 census):

- Líšnice (212)
- Vyšehorky (168)

== Demographics ==
Historical population
Year	Pop.	±%
1869	696	—
1880	694	−0.3%
1890	664	−4.3%
1900	671	+1.1%
1910	632	−5.8%
1921	602	−4.7%
1930	595	−1.2%
1950	375	−37.0%
1961	389	+3.7%
1970	339	−12.9%
1980	304	−10.3%
1991	276	−9.2%
2001	275	−0.4%
2011	313	+13.8%
2021	380	+21.4%
Source: Censuses
