= Pavlovice u Přerova =

- Municipality
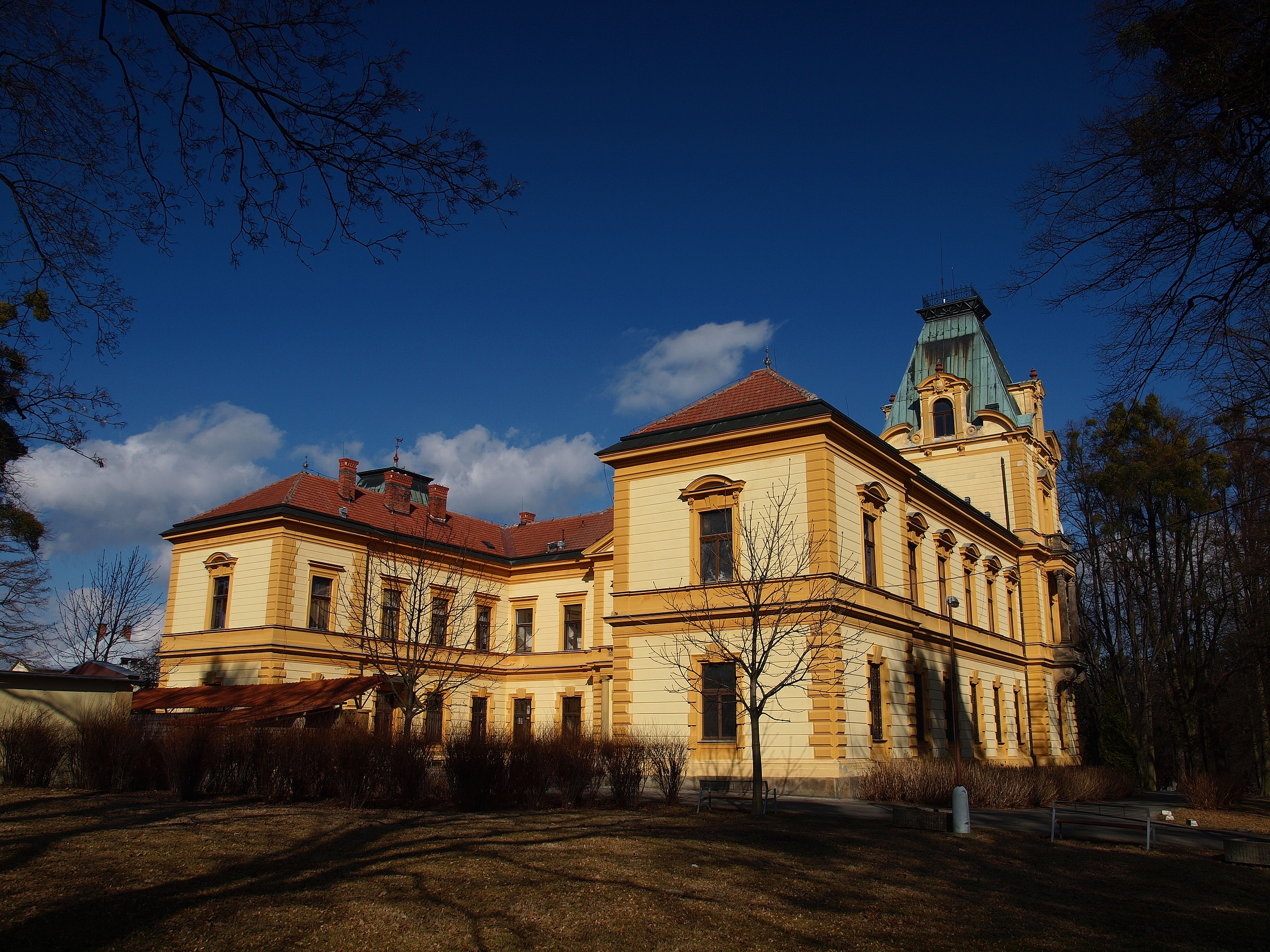
- Pavlovice u Přerova Castle

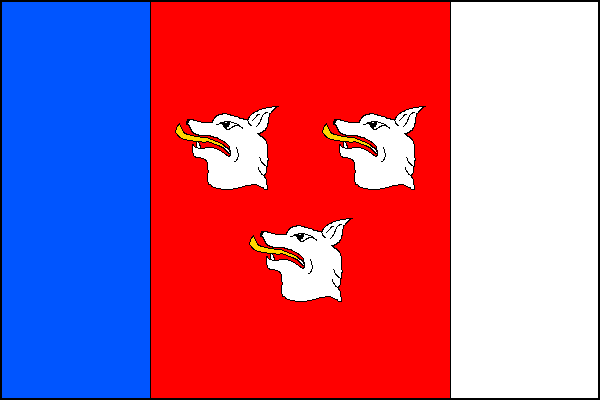
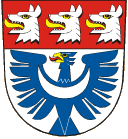
- Flag Coat of arms

- Location in the Czech Republic
- Coordinates: 49°28′10″N 17°32′52″E
- Country: Czech Republic
- Region: Olomouc
- District: Přerov
- First mentioned: 1349

Area
  - Total: 8.14 km^{2} (3.14 sq mi)
- Elevation: 284 m (932 ft)

Population (2026-01-01)
  - Total: 706
  - Density: 86.7/km^{2} (225/sq mi)
- Time zone: UTC+1 (CET)
  - Summer (DST): UTC+2 (CEST)
- Postal code: 751 11
- Website: www.pavloviceuprerova.cz

Pavlovice u Přerova is a municipality and village in Přerov District in the Olomouc Region of the Czech Republic. It has about 700 inhabitants.

Pavlovice u Přerova lies approximately 8 kilometres (5 mi) east of Přerov, 26 km (16 mi) south-east of Olomouc, and 236 km (147 mi) east of Prague.

== History ==
The first written mention of Pavlovice u Přerova is from 1349.

== Demographics ==
Historical population
Year	Pop.	±%
1869	630	—
1880	675	+7.1%
1890	719	+6.5%
1900	719	+0.0%
1910	775	+7.8%
1921	733	−5.4%
1930	812	+10.8%
1950	789	−2.8%
1961	979	+24.1%
1970	975	−0.4%
1980	914	−6.3%
1991	775	−15.2%
2001	778	+0.4%
2011	723	−7.1%
2021	711	−1.7%
Source: Censuses
