= Říkovice =

- Municipality
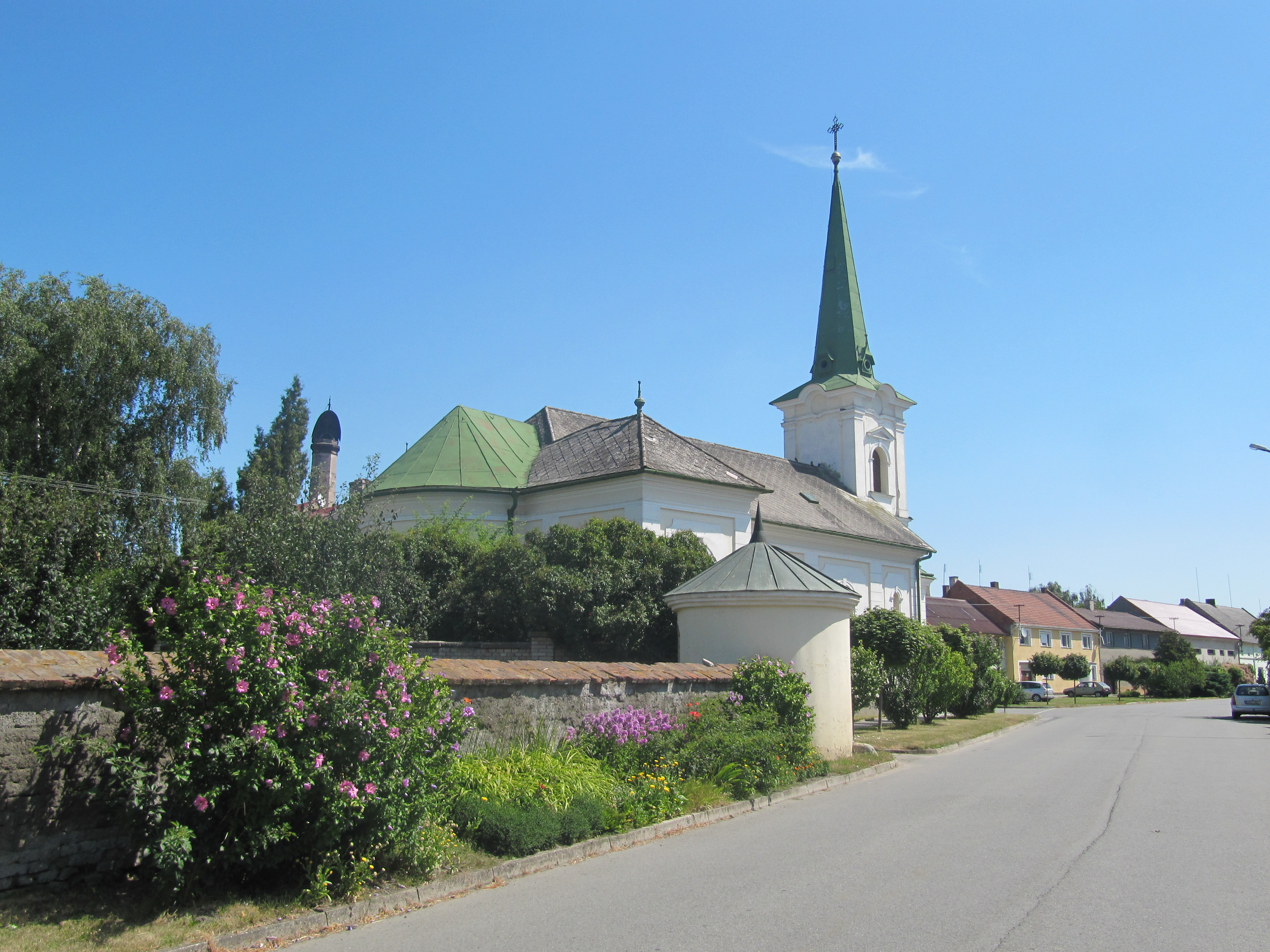
- Church of Saint Anne

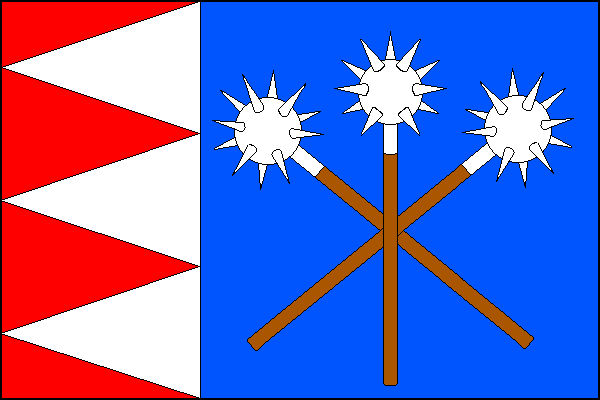
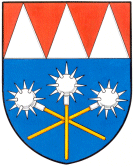
- Flag Coat of arms

- Location in the Czech Republic
- Coordinates: 49°22′54″N 17°27′5″E
- Country: Czech Republic
- Region: Olomouc
- District: Přerov
- First mentioned: 1274

Area
  - Total: 3.88 km^{2} (1.50 sq mi)
- Elevation: 204 m (669 ft)

Population (2026-01-01)
  - Total: 456
  - Density: 118/km^{2} (304/sq mi)
- Time zone: UTC+1 (CET)
  - Summer (DST): UTC+2 (CEST)
- Postal code: 751 18
- Website: www.rikovice.cz

Říkovice is a municipality and village in Přerov District in the Olomouc Region of the Czech Republic. It has about 500 inhabitants.

Říkovice lies approximately 9 kilometres (6 mi) south of Přerov, 28 km (17 mi) south-east of Olomouc, and 232 km (144 mi) east of Prague.

== Demographics ==
Historical population
| Year | Pop. | ±% |
|---|---|---|
| 1869 | 327 | — |
| 1880 | 375 | +14.7% |
| 1890 | 422 | +12.5% |
| 1900 | 455 | +7.8% |
| 1910 | 551 | +21.1% |
| 1921 | 522 | −5.3% |
| 1930 | 590 | +13.0% |
| 1950 | 500 | −15.3% |
| 1961 | 517 | +3.4% |
| 1970 | 533 | +3.1% |
| 1980 | 509 | −4.5% |
| 1991 | 453 | −11.0% |
| 2001 | 453 | +0.0% |
| 2011 | 458 | +1.1% |
| 2021 | 436 | −4.8% |
Source: Censuses
