= Haňovice =

- Municipality
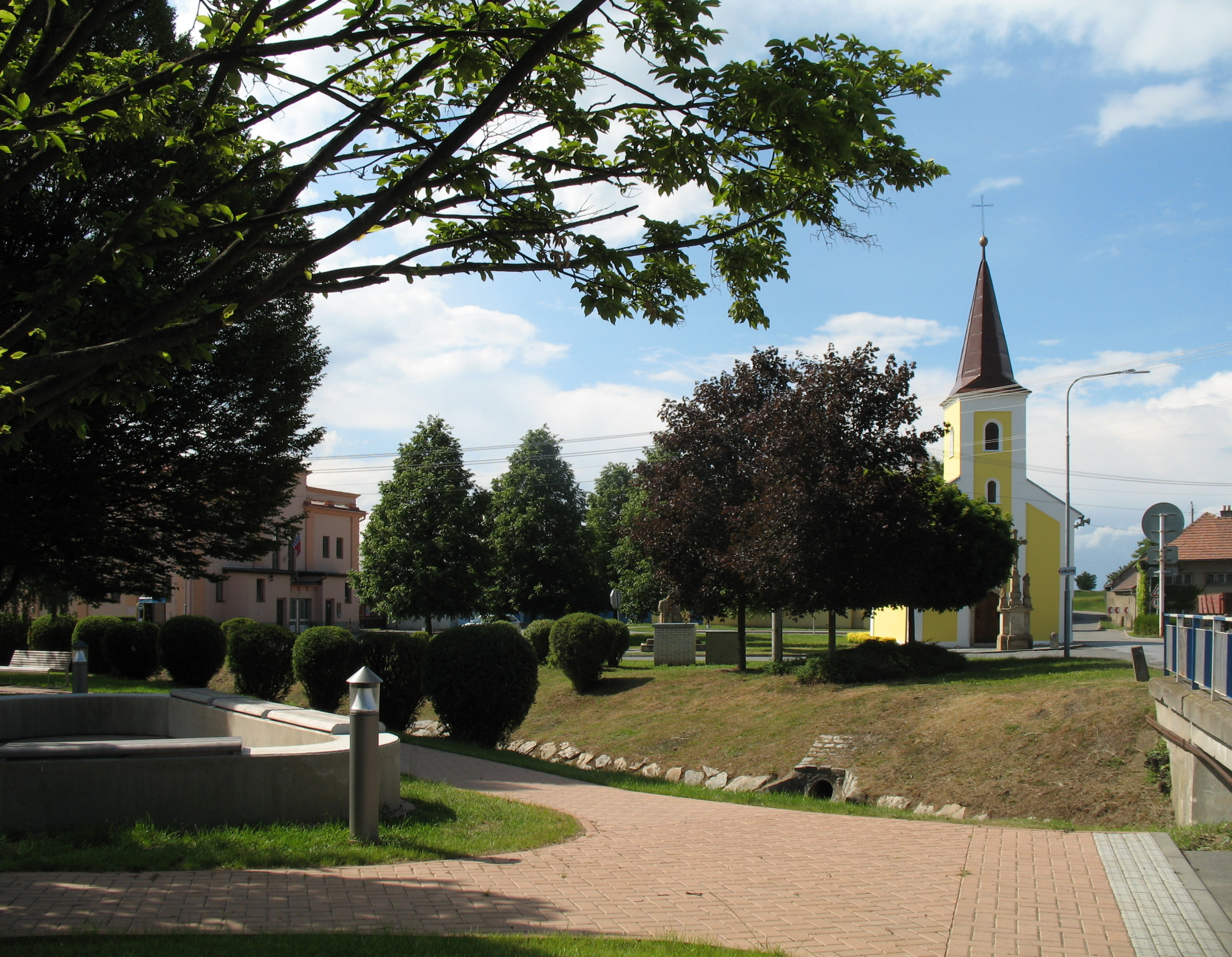
- Park in the centre of Haňovice

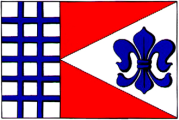
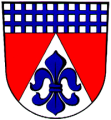
- Flag Coat of arms

- Location in the Czech Republic
- Coordinates: 49°40′52″N 17°2′42″E
- Country: Czech Republic
- Region: Olomouc
- District: Olomouc
- First mentioned: 1141

Area
  - Total: 2.80 km^{2} (1.08 sq mi)
- Elevation: 263 m (863 ft)

Population (2026-01-01)
  - Total: 505
  - Density: 180/km^{2} (467/sq mi)
- Time zone: UTC+1 (CET)
  - Summer (DST): UTC+2 (CEST)
- Postal code: 783 21
- Website: www.hanovice.cz

Haňovice is a municipality and village in Olomouc District in the Olomouc Region of the Czech Republic. It has about 500 inhabitants.

== Administrative division ==
Haňovice consists of two municipal parts (in brackets population according to the 2021 census):

- Haňovice (335)
- Kluzov (91)

== Etymology ==
The initial name of the village was Hanějovice. The name was derived from the personal name Haněj. In the 19th century, the name was shortened to Haňovice.

== History ==
The first written mention of Haňovice is in a deed of bishop Jindřich Zdík from 1141. The village was probably founded at the turn of the 11th and 12th centuries.

== Geography ==
Haňovice is located about 17 kilometres (11 mi) northwest of Olomouc. Most of the municipal territory lies in a flat agricultural landscape in the Upper Morava Valley. The western part extends into the Zábřeh Highlands and includes the highest point of Haňovice at 298 m (978 ft) above sea level. The Loučka Stream flows through the municipality.

== Demographics ==
Historical population

Year	Pop.	±%
1869	396	—
1880	482	+21.7%
1890	518	+7.5%
1900	456	−12.0%
1910	431	−5.5%

Year	Pop.	±%
1921	535	+24.1%
1930	538	+0.6%
1950	419	−22.1%
1961	447	+6.7%
1970	465	+4.0%

Year	Pop.	±%
1980	431	−7.3%
1991	453	+5.1%
2001	445	−1.8%
2011	459	+3.1%
2021	426	−7.2%

Source: Censuses

== Transport ==
The D35 motorway (part of the European route E442) from Olomouc to the Hradec Králové Region runs along the northeastern municipal border.

The railway line Prostějov–Červenka passes through the municipality, but there is no train station. The municipality is served by the station in neighbouring Litovel-Myslechovice.

== Sights ==
There are no protected cultural monuments in the municipality. The main landmark is the Chapel of Saints Cyril and Methodius, located in the centre of the village.
