= Malhotice =

- Municipality
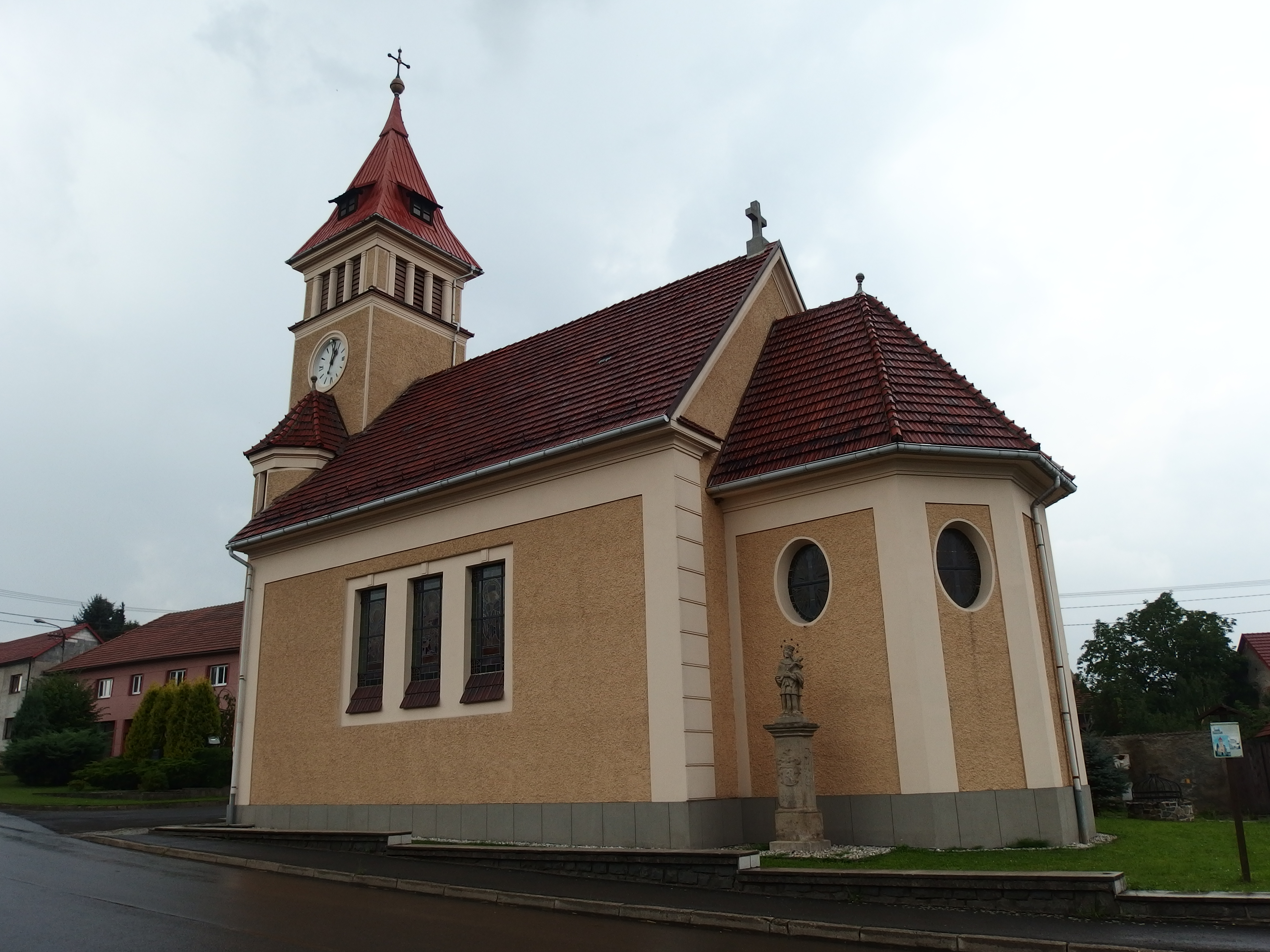
- Church of the Immaculate Conception

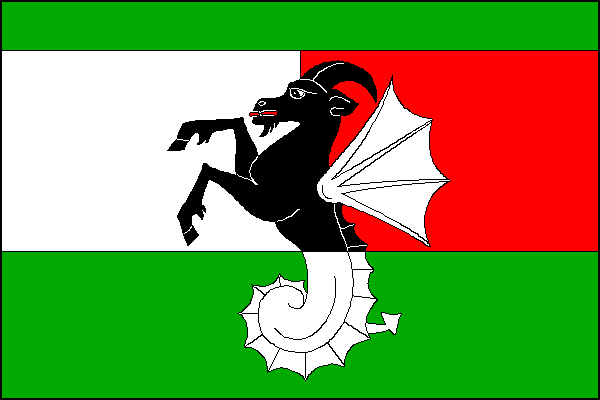
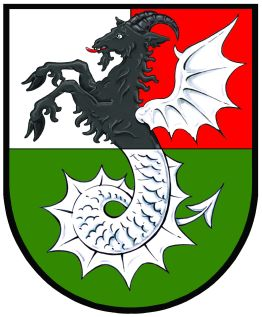
- Flag Coat of arms

- Location in the Czech Republic
- Coordinates: 49°29′24″N 17°45′51″E
- Country: Czech Republic
- Region: Olomouc
- District: Přerov
- First mentioned: 1317

Area
  - Total: 7.68 km^{2} (2.97 sq mi)
- Elevation: 296 m (971 ft)

Population (2026-01-01)
  - Total: 358
  - Density: 46.6/km^{2} (121/sq mi)
- Time zone: UTC+1 (CET)
  - Summer (DST): UTC+2 (CEST)
- Postal code: 753 53
- Website: www.malhotice.cz

Malhotice is a municipality and village in Přerov District in the Olomouc Region of the Czech Republic. It has about 400 inhabitants.

Malhotice lies approximately 23 kilometres (14 mi) east of Přerov, 39 km (24 mi) east of Olomouc, and 249 km (155 mi) east of Prague.

== Demographics ==
Historical population
Year	Pop.	±%
1869	535	—
1880	497	−7.1%
1890	489	−1.6%
1900	473	−3.3%
1910	500	+5.7%
1921	455	−9.0%
1930	476	+4.6%
1950	420	−11.8%
1961	438	+4.3%
1970	430	−1.8%
1980	406	−5.6%
1991	349	−14.0%
2001	334	−4.3%
2011	359	+7.5%
2021	352	−1.9%
Source: Censuses
