= Citov =

- Municipality
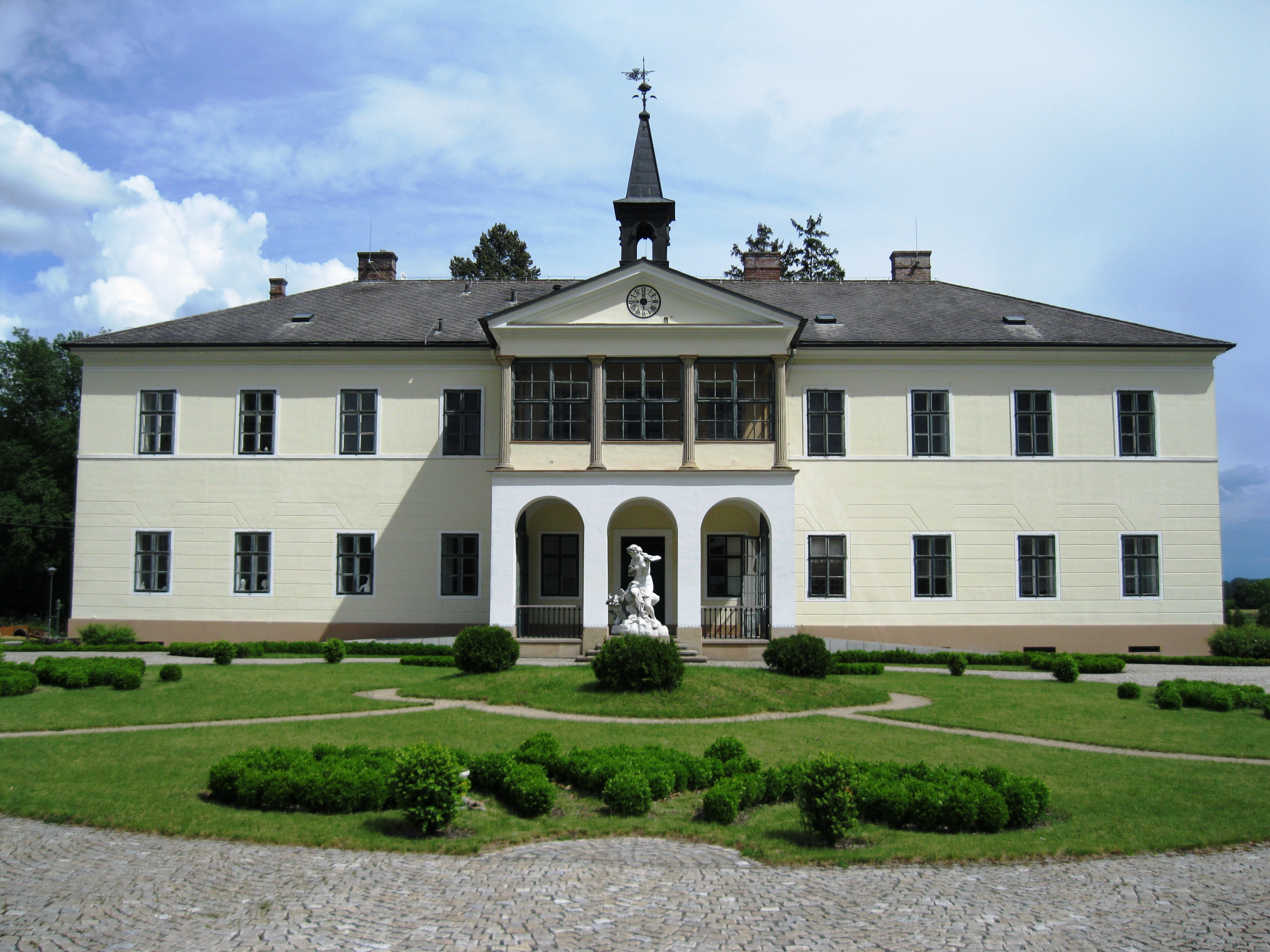
- Citov Castle

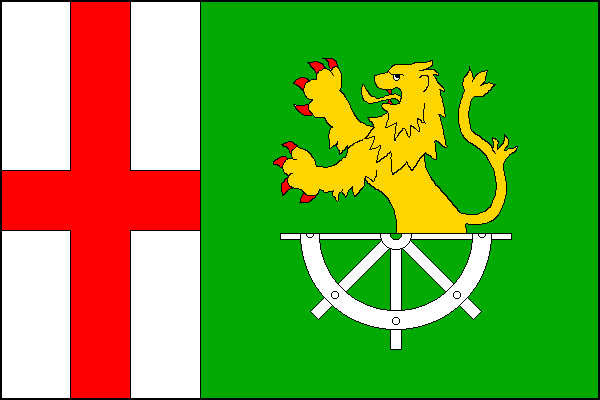
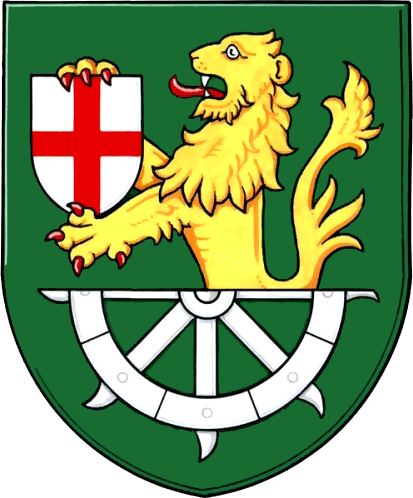
- Flag Coat of arms

- Location in the Czech Republic
- Coordinates: 49°28′4″N 17°19′32″E
- Country: Czech Republic
- Region: Olomouc
- District: Přerov
- First mentioned: 1283

Area
  - Total: 3.74 km^{2} (1.44 sq mi)
- Elevation: 201 m (659 ft)

Population (2026-01-01)
  - Total: 520
  - Density: 140/km^{2} (360/sq mi)
- Time zone: UTC+1 (CET)
  - Summer (DST): UTC+2 (CEST)
- Postal code: 751 03
- Website: www.obeccitov.cz

Citov is a municipality and village in Přerov District in the Olomouc Region of the Czech Republic. It has about 500 inhabitants.

Citov lies approximately 10 kilometres (6 mi) west of Přerov, 16 km (10 mi) south of Olomouc, and 220 km (140 mi) east of Prague.

== Demographics ==
Historical population
Year	Pop.	±%
1869	576	—
1880	531	−7.8%
1890	560	+5.5%
1900	519	−7.3%
1910	580	+11.8%
1921	593	+2.2%
1930	644	+8.6%
1950	526	−18.3%
1961	587	+11.6%
1970	510	−13.1%
1980	477	−6.5%
1991	463	−2.9%
2001	503	+8.6%
2011	519	+3.2%
2021	500	−3.7%
Source: Censuses
