= Tepenec Castle =

Former castle in Moravia

Coordinates: 49.7028°N 17.3608°E

Tepenec Castle (German: Burg Twingenberg, a.k.a. Karlsburg) is a former castle in the vicinity of Jívová in Moravia, in the Czech Republic. The castle was built by Emperor Charles IV between 1340 and 1346. It stood in the Bělkovic valley, 4 kilometres (2.5 mi) east of Sternberg in Moravia. Charles named it Twingenberg after an eponymous castle in Luxembourg. The castle was ruined in 1391.

For several centuries, the ruins were visible on the top of hill until the half of 19th century when the extraction of the stone in a quarry on the western hillside destroyed much of the castle except of the fortification and outwork on the east part. The ongoing excavation during the 20th century and especially after 2010 probably has destroyed all remnants of the castle.
