= Jesenec =

- Municipality
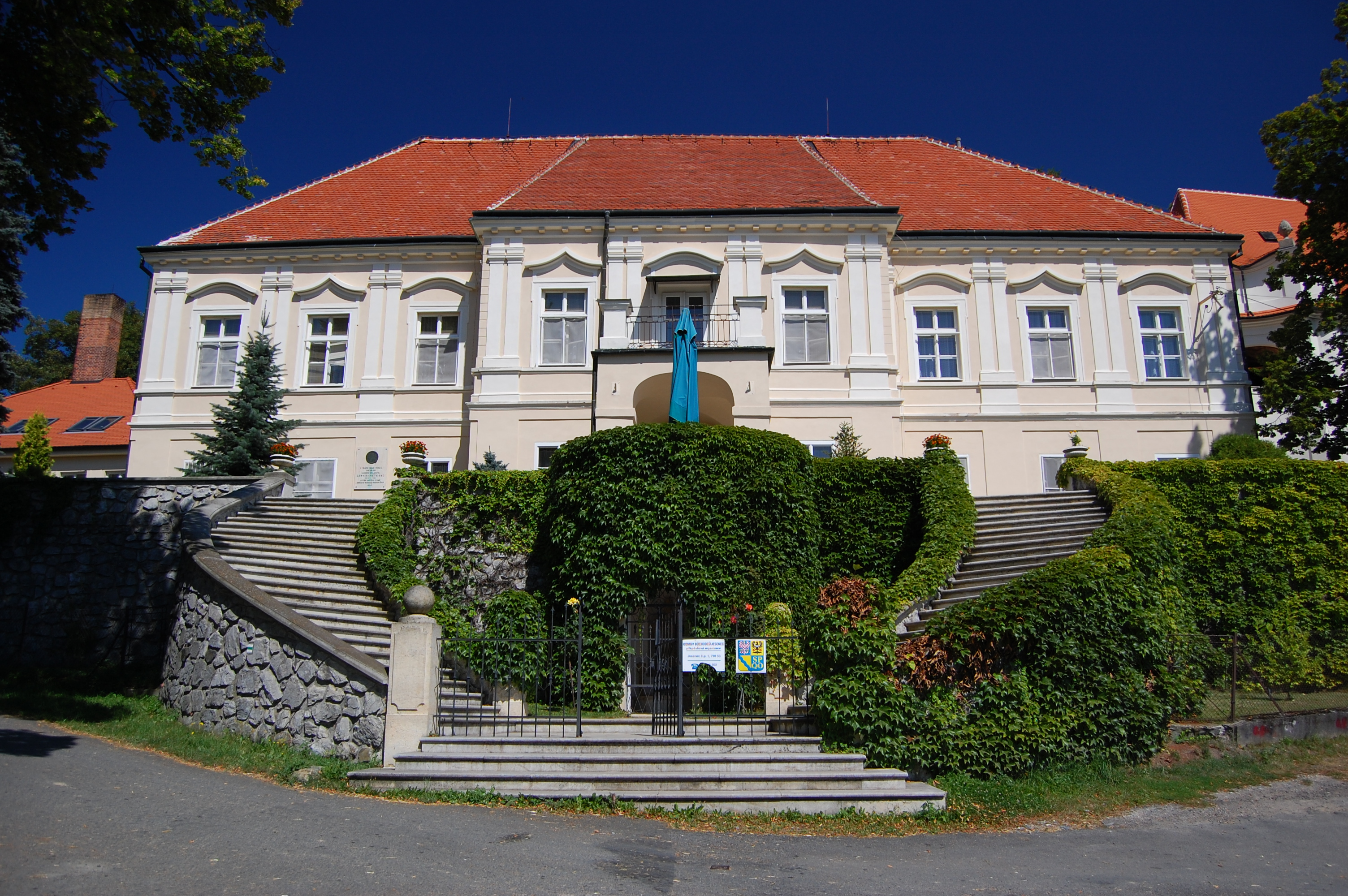
- Jesenec Castle

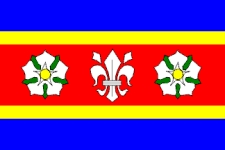
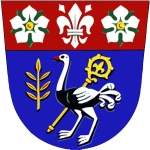
- Flag Coat of arms

- Location in the Czech Republic
- Coordinates: 49°36′30″N 16°51′44″E
- Country: Czech Republic
- Region: Olomouc
- District: Prostějov
- First mentioned: 1351

Area
  - Total: 4.81 km^{2} (1.86 sq mi)
- Elevation: 474 m (1,555 ft)

Population (2026-01-01)
  - Total: 284
  - Density: 59.0/km^{2} (153/sq mi)
- Time zone: UTC+1 (CET)
  - Summer (DST): UTC+2 (CEST)
- Postal code: 798 53
- Website: www.jesenec.cz

Jesenec is a municipality and village in Prostějov District in the Olomouc Region of the Czech Republic. It has about 300 inhabitants.

Jesenec lies approximately 24 kilometres (15 mi) north-west of Prostějov, 29 km (18 mi) west of Olomouc, and 184 km (114 mi) east of Prague.

== Demographics ==
Historical population
Year	Pop.	±%
1869	650	—
1880	673	+3.5%
1890	621	−7.7%
1900	586	−5.6%
1910	558	−4.8%
1921	524	−6.1%
1930	566	+8.0%
1950	456	−19.4%
1961	518	+13.6%
1970	497	−4.1%
1980	463	−6.8%
1991	368	−20.5%
2001	361	−1.9%
2011	300	−16.9%
2021	311	+3.7%
Source: Censuses
