= Hlubočky =

- Municipality
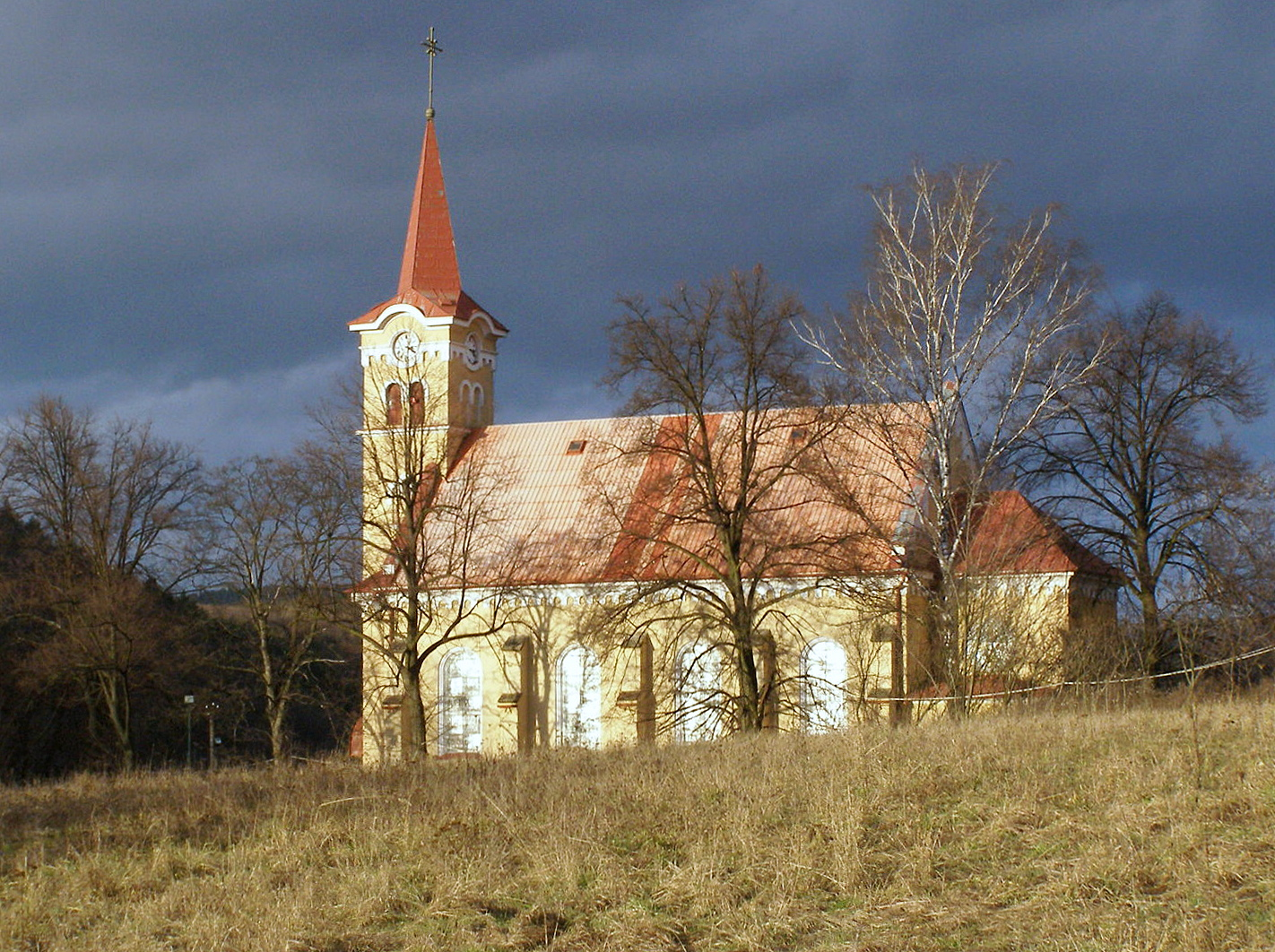
- Church of the Sacred Heart

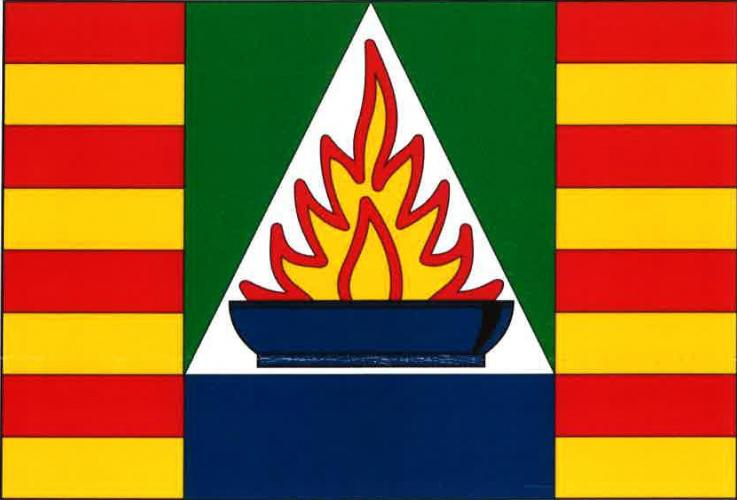
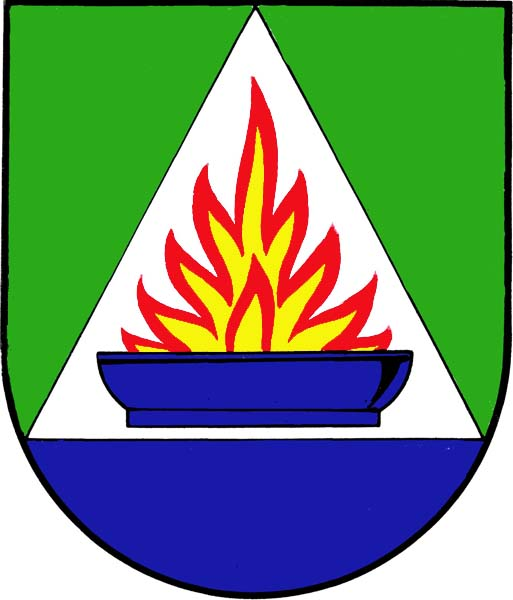
- Flag Coat of arms

- Location in the Czech Republic
- Coordinates: 49°37′39″N 17°24′9″E
- Country: Czech Republic
- Region: Olomouc
- District: Olomouc
- First mentioned: 1368

Area
  - Total: 22.31 km^{2} (8.61 sq mi)
- Elevation: 382 m (1,253 ft)

Population (2026-01-01)
  - Total: 4,176
  - Density: 187.2/km^{2} (484.8/sq mi)
- Time zone: UTC+1 (CET)
  - Summer (DST): UTC+2 (CEST)
- Postal codes: 783 61, 783 65
- Website: www.hlubocky.cz

Hlubočky (Czech pronunciation: [ˈɦlubotʃkɪ]; German: Hombok) is a municipality and village in Olomouc District in the Olomouc Region of the Czech Republic. It has about 4,200 inhabitants, making it the most populous municipality in the region without the town status.

== Administrative division ==
Hlubočky consists of four municipal parts (in brackets population according to the 2021 census):

- Hlubočky (2,026)
- Hrubá Voda (301)
- Mariánské Údolí (1,717)
- Posluchov (98)

== Geography ==
Hlubočky is located about 10 kilometres (6 mi) northeast of Olomouc. It lies in the Nízký Jeseník range. The highest point is the Jedlina hill at 617 m (2,024 ft) above sea level. The built-up area is situated in the valley of the Bystřice River.

== History ==
The first written mention of Hlubočky is from 1368. From 1408, it was part of the Hluboký estate. After the Hluboký Castle became an abandoned ruin around 1500, the village became part of the Velká Bystřice estate. In 1827, ironworks and smelters were founded here and the settlement of Mariánské Údolí was established. The municipality was industrialised and became known for the manufacture of household appliances.

== Demographics ==
Hlubočky is the most populous municipality in the region without the town status.

Historical population

Year	Pop.	±%
1869	922	—
1880	1,087	+17.9%
1890	1,253	+15.3%
1900	1,385	+10.5%
1910	1,495	+7.9%

Year	Pop.	±%
1921	1,906	+27.5%
1930	2,088	+9.5%
1950	2,586	+23.9%
1961	3,379	+30.7%
1970	3,551	+5.1%

Year	Pop.	±%
1980	5,005	+40.9%
1991	4,660	−6.9%
2001	4,574	−1.8%
2011	4,119	−9.9%
2021	4,142	+0.6%

Source: Censuses

== Economy ==
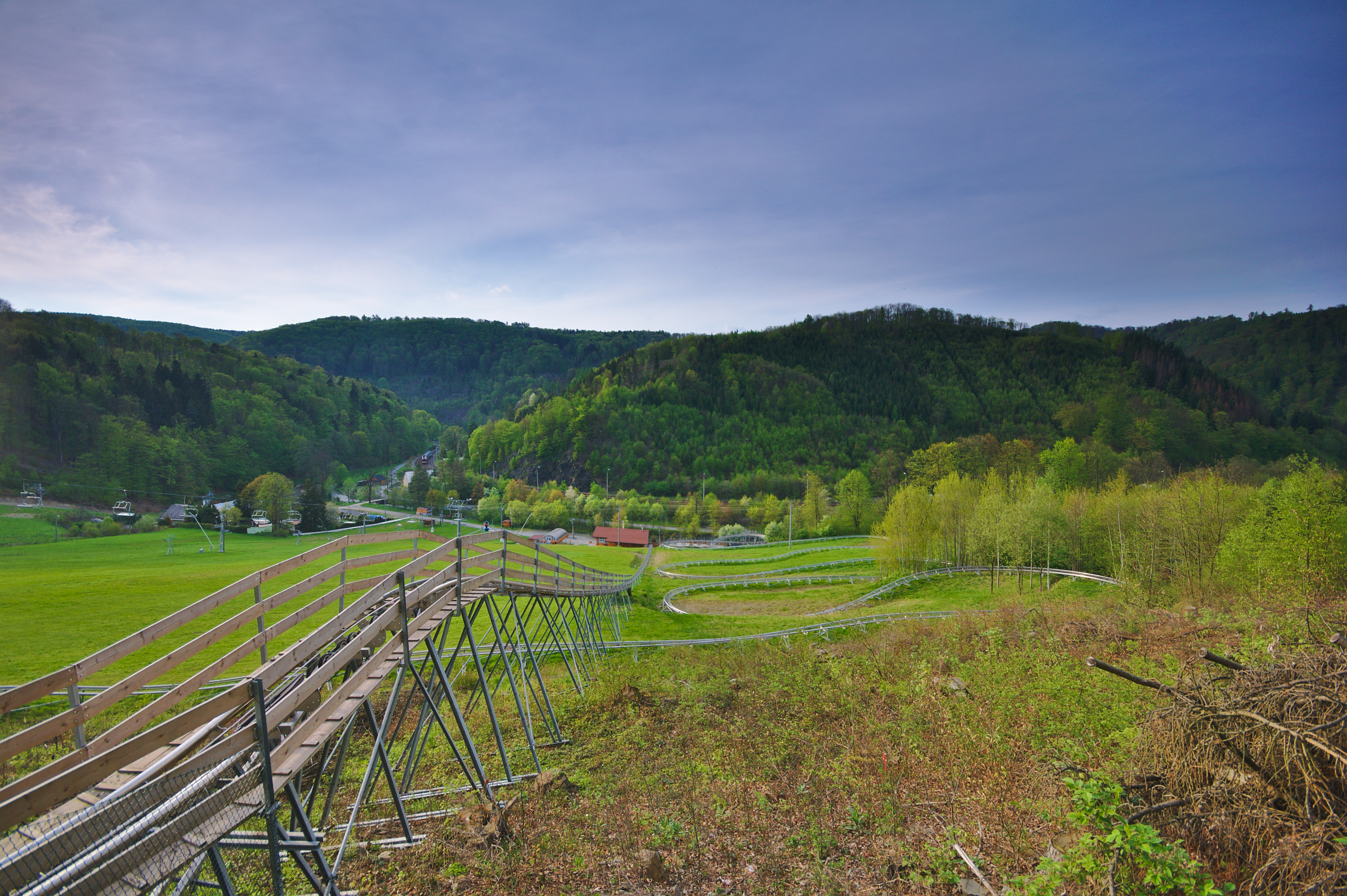
Bobsled track in Hrubá Voda

The municipality serves as a recreational area, especially for inhabitants of Olomouc. It has about 1,000 holiday cottages. There are also two ski resorts.

A notable industrial company located in Hlubočky is Honeywell Aerospace Olomouc (formerly known as Moravia Aerospace Motor Works), engaged in the production of parts for aircraft engines.

== Transport ==
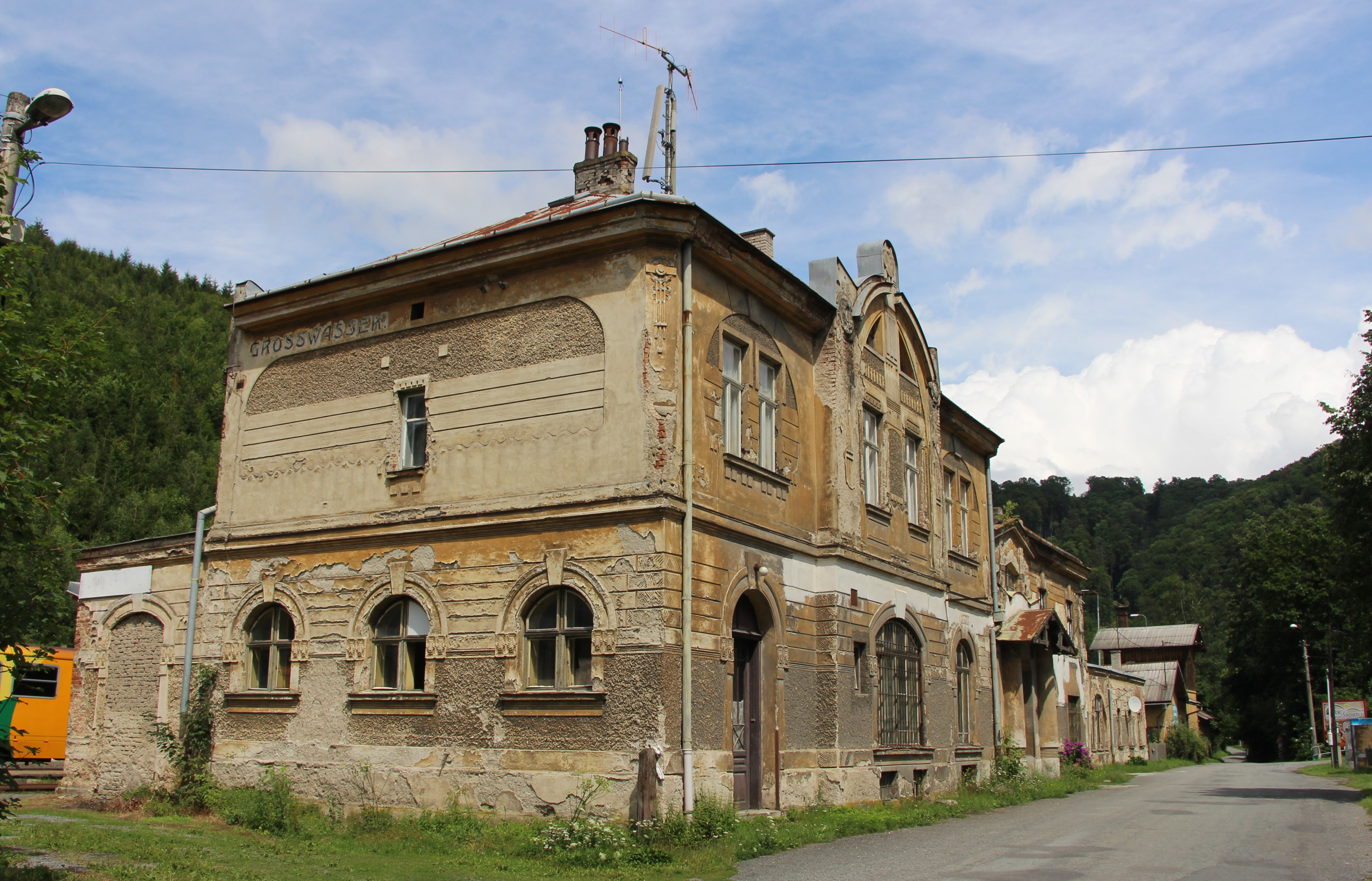
Hrubá Voda train station

Hlubočky is located on the railway line Olomouc–Moravský Beroun. The railway forms the axis of the municipality and there are five stations and stops: Hlubočky-Marianske Údolí, Hlubočky zastávka, Hlubočky, Hrubá Voda zastávka and Hrubá Voda.

== Sights ==
The main landmark of Hlubočky is the Church of the Sacred Heart. It was built in the Neo-Romanesque style in 1910.

An architecturally valuable building is the Hrubá Voda train station. It was built in 1870–1872 and rebuilt and expanded in the Art Nouveau style in 1917.
