= Bystřice (Morava) =

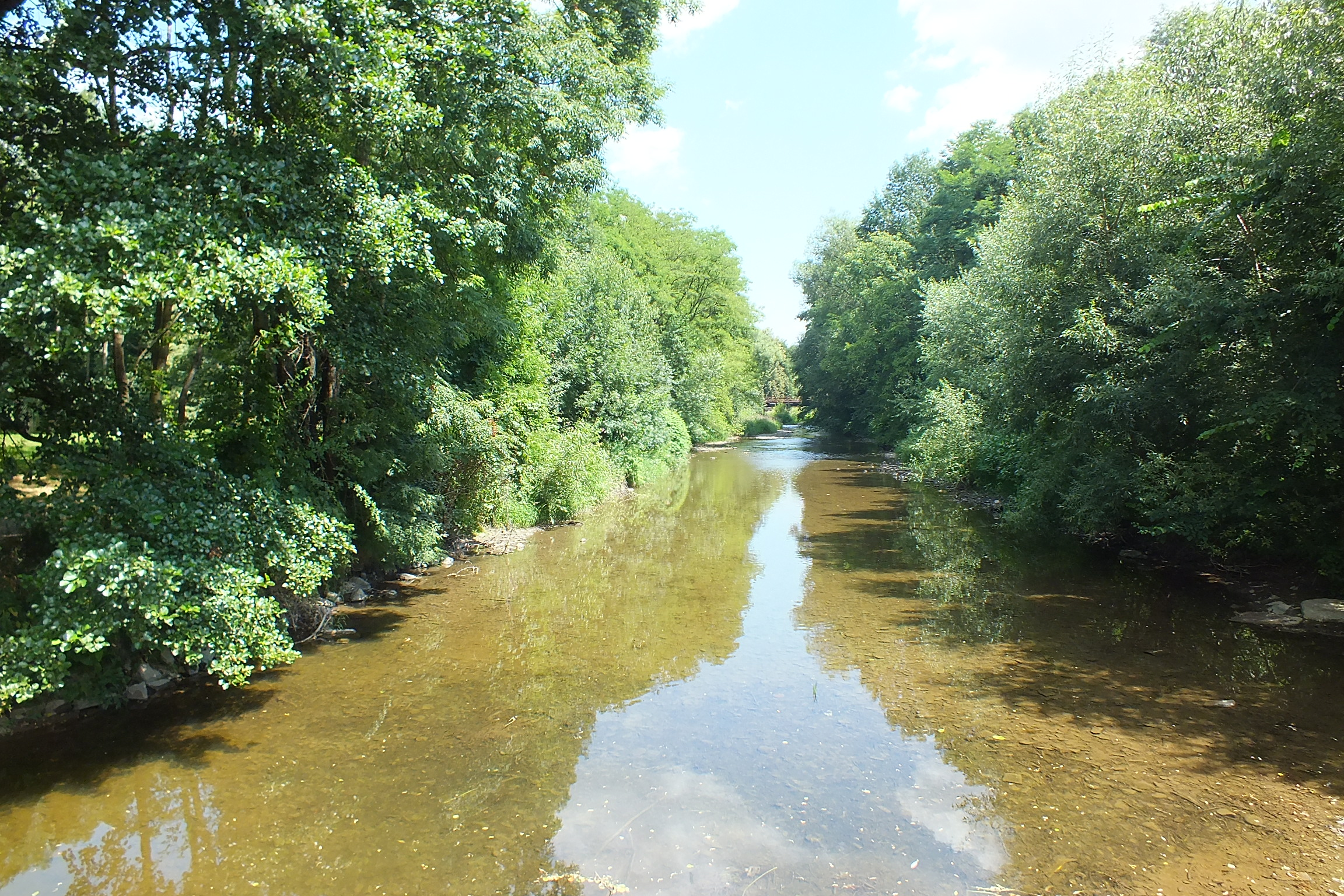
- The Bystřice in Bystrovany

Location
- Country: Czech Republic
- Regions: Olomouc; Moravian-Silesian

Physical characteristics
- Source
  - location: Ryžoviště, Nízký Jeseník
  - coordinates: 49°51′52″N 17°22′18″E
  - elevation: 658 m (2,159 ft)
- Mouth
  - location: Morava
  - coordinates: 49°35′34″N 17°16′6″E
  - elevation: 210 m (690 ft)
- Length: 56.1 km (34.9 mi)
- Basin size: 266.0 km^{2} (102.7 sq mi)
- Discharge
  - average: 1.88 m^{3}/s (66 cu ft/s) near estuary

Basin features
- Progression: Morava→ Danube→ Black Sea

The Bystřice (Czech pronunciation: [ˈbɪstr̝̊ɪtsɛ]) is a river in the Czech Republic, a left tributary of the Morava River. It flows through the Olomouc and Moravian-Silesian regions. It is 56.1 km (34.9 mi) long.

== Etymology ==
The name of the river is derived from the Czech word bystrá, which used to mean 'fast-flowing', 'rapid'.

== Characteristic ==
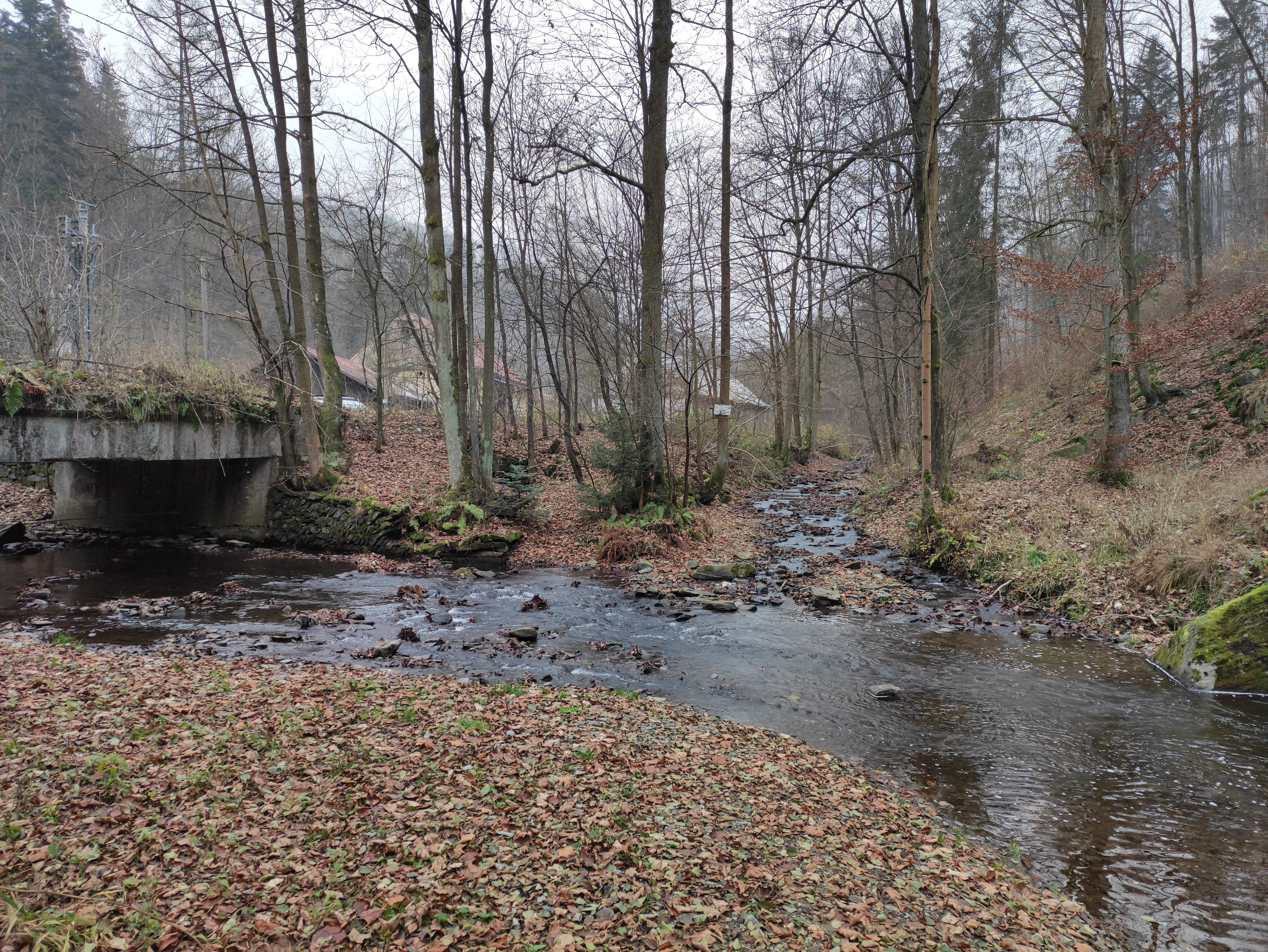
Confluence the Bystřice (left) and Lichnička

The Bystřice originates in the territory of Ryžoviště in the Nízký Jeseník range at an elevation of 658 m (2,159 ft) and flows to Olomouc, where it enters the Morava River at an elevation of 210 m (690 ft). It is 56.1 km (34.9 mi) long. Its drainage basin has an area of 266.0 km^{2} (102.7 sq mi). The average discharge near the mouth is 1.88 m3/s.

The tributaries of the Bystřice are only short streams. The longest tributaries of the Bystřice are:

Tributary	Length (km)	Side
Důlní potok	12.4	left
Vrtůvka	12.3	left
Lichnička	6.6	left

== Course ==
The most notable settlement on the river is the city of Olomouc. The river flows through the municipal territories of Ryžoviště, Lomnice, Dětřichov nad Bystřicí, Moravský Beroun, Hraničné Petrovice, Domašov nad Bystřicí, Jívová, Hlubočky, Velká Bystřice, Bystrovany and Olomouc.

== Bodies of water ==
There are 95 bodies of water in the basin area, but only two of them have an area larger than 1 ha (2.5 acres).

== See also ==
- List of rivers of the Czech Republic
