= Velká Bystřice =

- Town
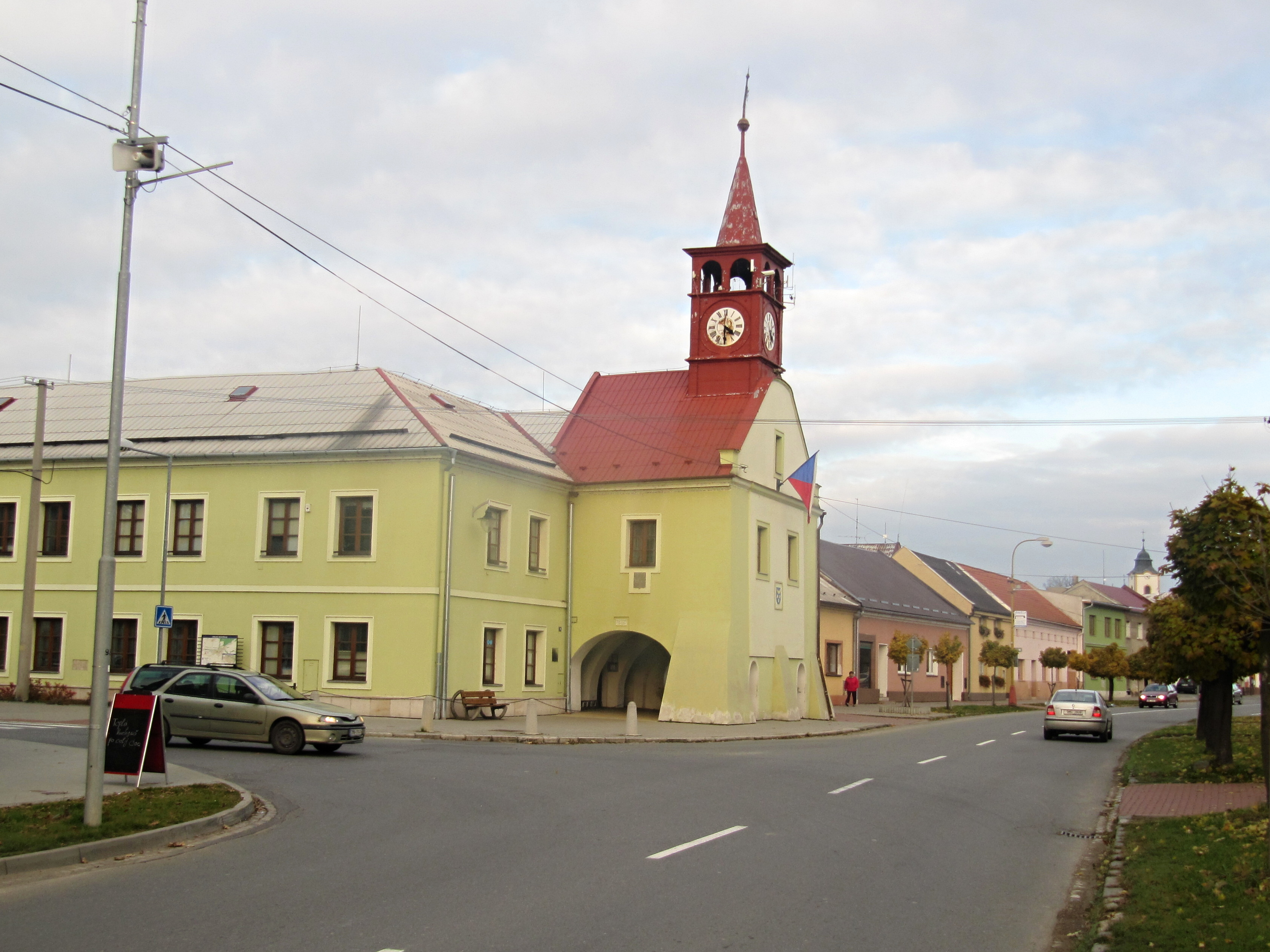
- Town hall

- Flag Coat of arms

- Location in the Czech Republic
- Coordinates: 49°35′39″N 17°21′50″E
- Country: Czech Republic
- Region: Olomouc
- District: Olomouc
- First mentioned: 1275

Government
  - Mayor: Marek Pazdera

Area
  - Total: 9.22 km^{2} (3.56 sq mi)
- Elevation: 290 m (950 ft)

Population (2026-01-01)
  - Total: 3,736
  - Density: 405/km^{2} (1,050/sq mi)
- Time zone: UTC+1 (CET)
  - Summer (DST): UTC+2 (CEST)
- Postal code: 783 53
- Website: www.velkabystrice.cz

Velká Bystřice (Czech pronunciation: [ˈvɛlkaː ˈbɪstr̝̊ɪtsɛ]; German: Groß Wisternitz) is a town in Olomouc District in the Olomouc Region of the Czech Republic. It has about 3,700 inhabitants. The town is located on the Bystřice River, on the border between the Upper Morava Valley and Nízký Jeseník range.

Velká Bystřice was founded in the 14th century at the latest and became a town in 1998. The main landmark of the town is the Church of the Beheading of Saint John the Baptist.

== Geography ==
Velká Bystřice is located about 6 kilometres (4 mi) east of Olomouc. It lies on the border between the Upper Morava Valley and Nízký Jeseník range. The highest point is at 315 m (1,033 ft) above sea level. The town is situated on both banks of the Bystřice River.

== History ==
The first written mention of Velká Bystřice is from 1275. A fortress in Velká Bystřice was first documented in 1381. Around 1500, the village was promoted to a market town. From 1589 until the establishment of an independent municipality in 1848, Velká Bystřice was owned by the Archdiocese of Olomouc. Velká Bystřice became a town in 1998.

== Demographics ==
Historical population

Year	Pop.	±%
1869	1,908	—
1880	2,027	+6.2%
1890	2,270	+12.0%
1900	2,545	+12.1%
1910	2,794	+9.8%

Year	Pop.	±%
1921	2,758	−1.3%
1930	2,892	+4.9%
1950	2,590	−10.4%
1961	2,701	+4.3%
1970	2,577	−4.6%

Year	Pop.	±%
1980	2,783	+8.0%
1991	2,870	+3.1%
2001	2,868	−0.1%
2011	3,053	+6.5%
2021	3,470	+13.7%

Source: Censuses

== Transport ==
A section of the D35 motorway (part of the European routes E442 and E462), which connects Olomouc with the D1 motorway, runs through the southern part of the municipal territory.

Velká Bystřice is located on the railway line Olomouc–Moravský Beroun.

== Sights ==
The most important monument is the Church of the Beheading of Saint John the Baptist. It is a Baroque church from 1742, but it has a Gothic core.

Velká Bystřice Castle was originally a Renaissance castle from the 1570s, created by the reconstruction of the old fortress from the first half of the 14th century. After a fire 1835, the castle was rebuilt and served as a brewery. Since 2014, it has been a hotel.

== Notable people ==
- František Moravec (born 1939), parasitologist
