= Dětřichov nad Bystřicí =

- Municipality
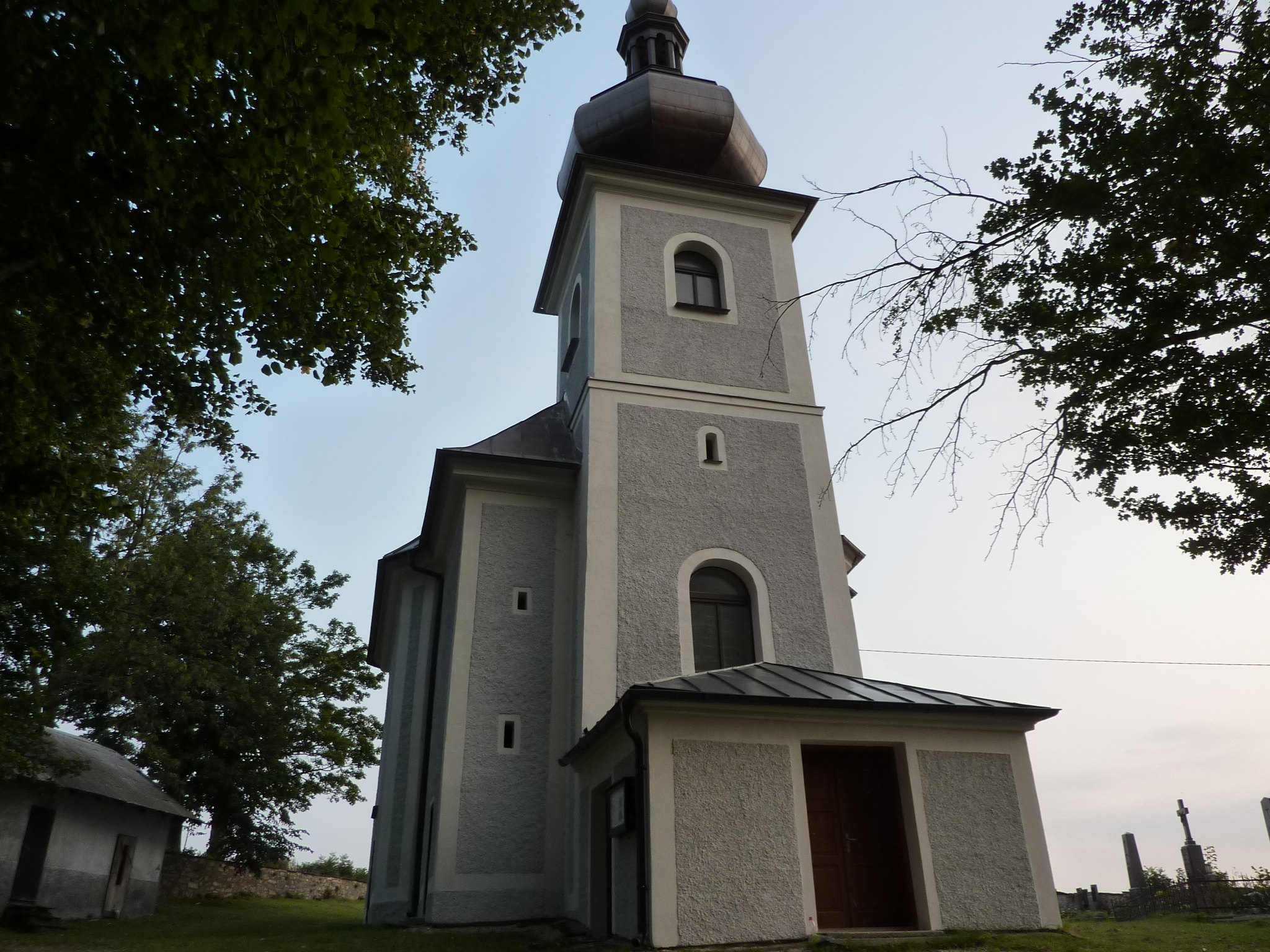
- Church of Saint George

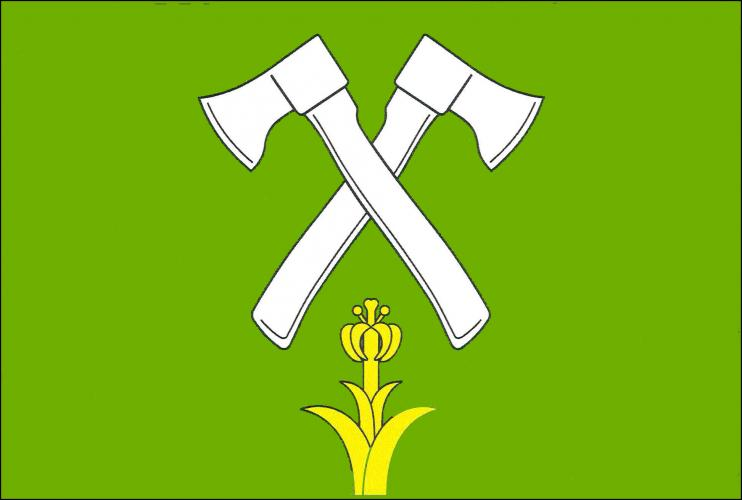
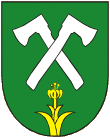
- Flag Coat of arms

- Location in the Czech Republic
- Coordinates: 49°50′3″N 17°24′6″E
- Country: Czech Republic
- Region: Moravian-Silesian
- District: Bruntál
- First mentioned: 1317

Area
  - Total: 28.29 km^{2} (10.92 sq mi)
- Elevation: 608 m (1,995 ft)

Population (2026-01-01)
  - Total: 404
  - Density: 14.3/km^{2} (37.0/sq mi)
- Time zone: UTC+1 (CET)
  - Summer (DST): UTC+2 (CEST)
- Postal codes: 793 03, 793 05
- Website: www.obec-detrichov.cz

Dětřichov nad Bystřicí (German: Dittersdorf) is a municipality and village in Bruntál District in the Moravian-Silesian Region of the Czech Republic. It has about 400 inhabitants.

== Administrative division ==
Dětřichov nad Bystřicí consists of two municipal parts (in brackets population according to the 2021 census):

- Dětřichov nad Bystřicí (398)
- Krahulčí (8)

== Geography ==
Dětřichov nad Bystřicí is located about 17 kilometres (11 mi) south of Bruntál and 28 km (17 mi) north of Olomouc. It lies in the Nízký Jeseník range. The highest point is the hill Slunečná at 802 m (2,631 ft) above sea level. The Bystřice River flows through the municipality.

== History ==
The first written mention of Dětřichov nad Bystřicí is from 1317. Before 1410, the village became part of the Šternberk estate. It remained so until the establishment of an independent municipality in 1850. Krahulčí was a separate municipality until 1960, when it was annexed to Dětřichov nad Bystřicí.

In 1938, after the Munich Agreement, the municipality was annexed by Nazi Germany and administered as a part of the Reichsgau Sudetenland. The German-speaking population was expelled in 1945 according to the Beneš decrees and replaced by Czech settlers.

== Demographics ==
Historical population

Year	Pop.	±%
1869	789	—
1880	821	+4.1%
1890	825	+0.5%
1900	828	+0.4%
1910	866	+4.6%

Year	Pop.	±%
1921	921	+6.4%
1930	835	−9.3%
1950	596	−28.6%
1961	715	+20.0%
1970	700	−2.1%

Year	Pop.	±%
1980	562	−19.7%
1991	474	−15.7%
2001	512	+8.0%
2011	429	−16.2%
2021	406	−5.4%

Source: Censuses

== Transport ==
The I/45 road (the section from Bruntál to the Olomouc Region) runs through the municipality.

Dětřichov nad Bystřicí is located on the railway line Ostrava–Opava.

== Sights ==
The main landmark of Dětřichov nad Bystřicí is the Church of Saint George. It was built in the Neoclassical style in 1766–1767, when it replaced an older wooden church. In the first half of the 19th century, it was modified to its present form.
