= Oderské vrchy =

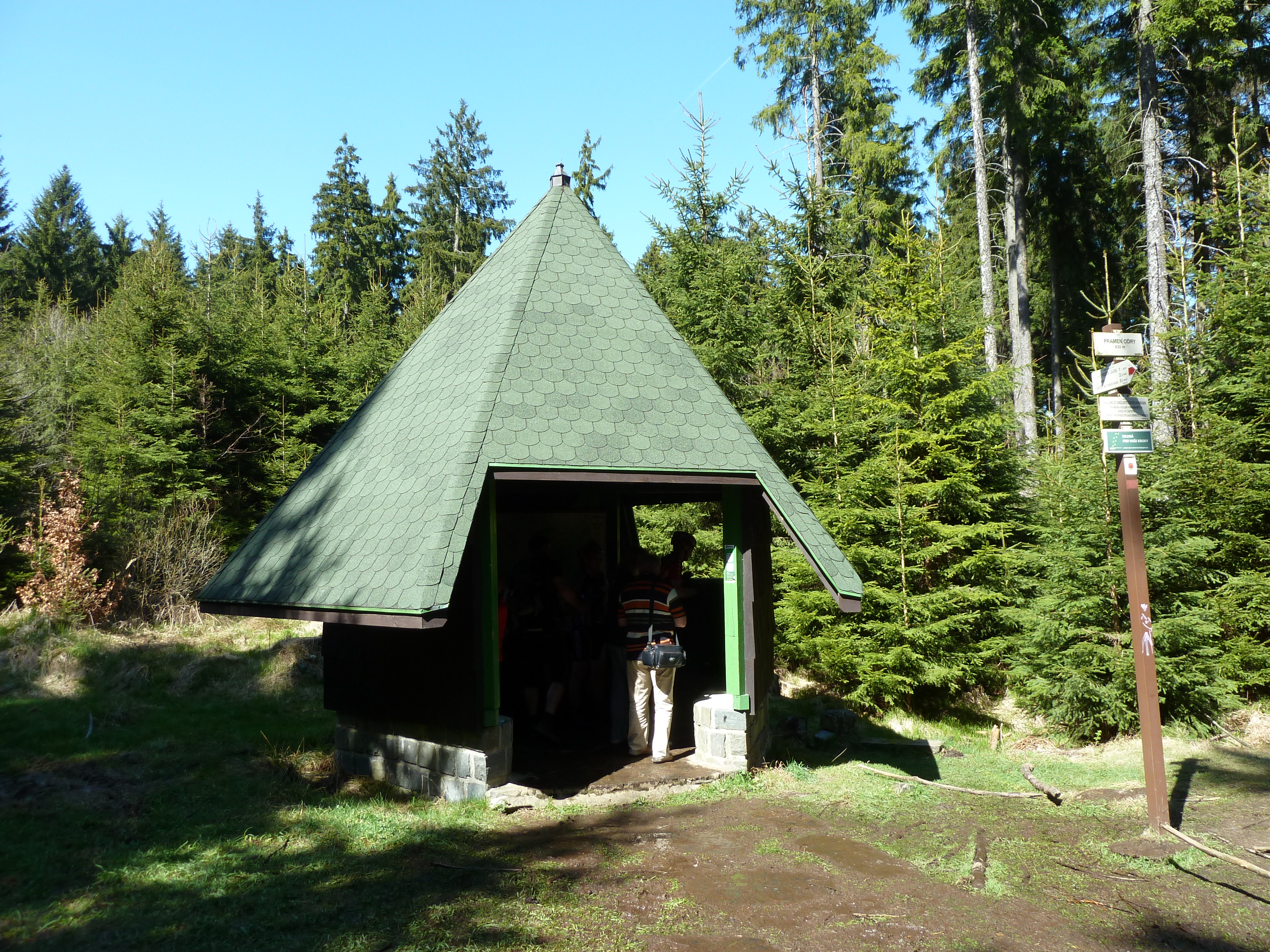
- Oder source near Velký Újezd

Highest point
- Peak: Fidlův kopec
- Elevation: 680 m (2,230 ft)
- Coordinates: 49°37′13.94″N 17°30′18.5″E

Dimensions
- Area: 181 km^{2} (70 mi^{2})

Geography
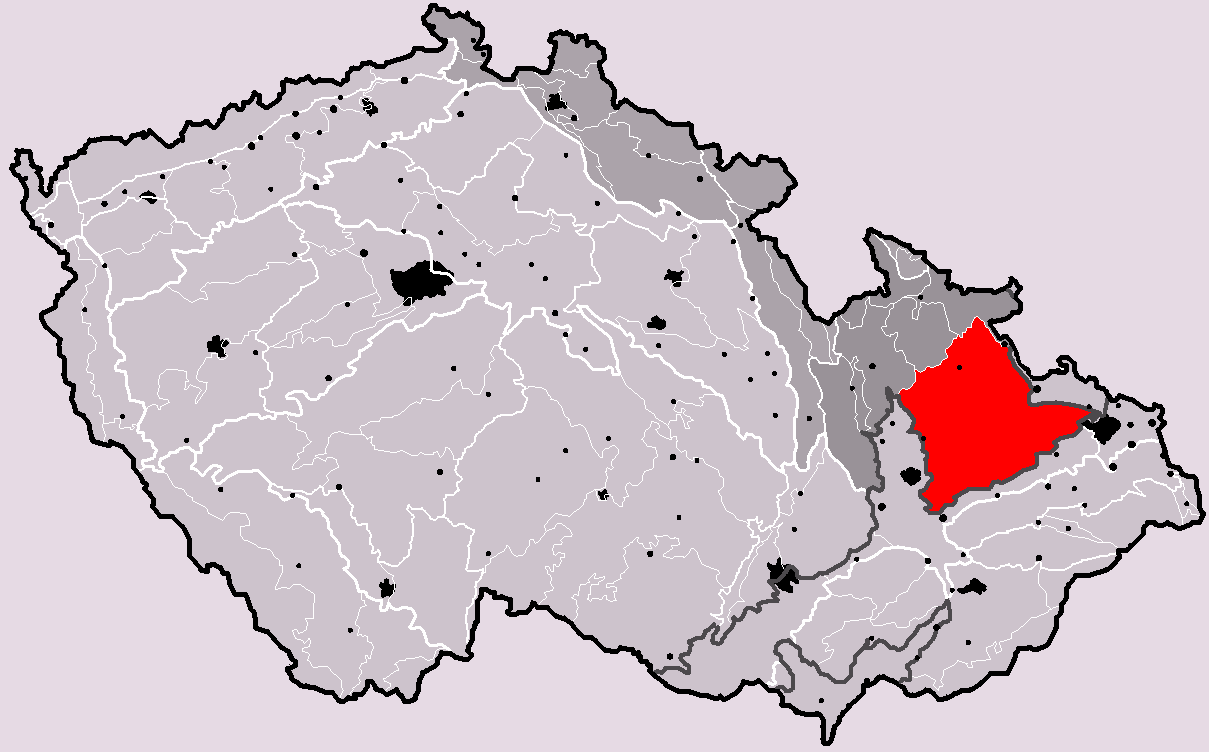
- Nízký Jesenik on the map of The Czech Republic. Oderské vrchy is part of this mountain range.
- Country: Czech Republic
- State: Olomouc Region
- Parent range: Nízký Jeseník; Eastern Sudetes

The Oderské vrchy (in English the Oder Mountains or, less commonly, Odra Highlands) is a mountain range in the Czech Republic. It is a geomorphological microregion, part of the Nízký Jeseník mountain range within the Eastern Sudetes (part of the Sudetes). The highest peak is Fidlův kopec at a height of 680 metres (2,230 ft).

In the Oderské vrchy is the source of the Oder river, the second longest river in Poland.

== Geography ==
The range is located entirely in Czech territory and create a slight highland within the Eastern Sudetes mountains. To the southeast, the Oderské vrchy borders the Moravian Gate that separates it from the Western Carpathians. Otherwise they are surrounded by other smaller mountain ranges that belong to Nízký Jeseník.

Large part of the mountains are part of the Libavá military training area. Though recently reduced in size, this area, except for the trails to the source of the Oder river, is not open to tourists or visitors.

== Population ==
The area is very sparsely populated, there is no significant settlement in the mountain range. The closest cities and towns are Olomouc in the west, and Lipník nad Bečvou and Hranice in the south.

== Nature park ==
A nature park named Oderské vrchy is located outside the mountain range (in the Vítkov Highlands within the Nízký Jeseník), northeast of the range. It comprises an area of 287 km^{2} (111 sq mi) with the towns of Odry, Fulnek and Bílovec.
