= Marius Molsen =

German lawyer and politician (1899–1971)

Acting administrator of the Jarocin district
- In office 1941–1943

Administrator of the Moravský Beroun district
- In office 1938–1941

High mayor of Szczecin
- In office 27 January 1934 – 24 August 1934 (Note: Previously Molsen was an acting high mayor of Szczecin from 27 October 1933 to 27 January 1934)
- Preceded by: Wilhelm Stuckart
- Succeeded by: Werner Faber

Personal details
- Born: 1 December 1899 Flensburg, Germany
- Died: 2 December 1971 (aged 72) Flensburg, Germany
- Party: National Socialist German Workers' Party
- Education: Kiel University; Leipzig University; University of Hamburg
- Occupation: Lawyer: Statesman

Marius Molsen (German: [ˈmaː.ʁi̯.ʊs ˈmɔːl.sən]; 2 December 1899 – 3 December 1971) was a German lawyer and statesman. From 1934 to 1938, he was the high mayor of Szczecin. Later, he served as the administrator of the Moravský Beroun district from 1938 to 1941 and acting administrator of the Jarocin district from 1941 to 1943. From 1943 to 1944, he was a ministerial councilor in the Reich Ministry of the Interior. He was a member of the National Socialist German Workers' Party.

== Biography ==
Marius Molsen was born on 2 December 1899 in Flensburg, Germany. He studied law at the Kiel University, the Leipzig University, and the University of Hamburg. He passed the second state examination in 1926, and worked at the district office in Wetzlar until 1933. On 1 February 1933, Molsen joined the National Socialist German Workers' Party. From 1933, he worked in Szczecin (then known as Stettin). On 1 May 1933, he was appointed as a government councilor and assigned to the police headquarters. On 27 October 1933, he became an acting mayor of Szczecin, and was officially appointed to the office on 27 January 1934. He remained in office until 24 August 1934. Following the annexation of Czechoslovakia by Germany in 1938, was appointed as the administrator of the Moravský Beroun district (then known as Bärn). From 1941 to 1943, he substituted for the district administrator Peter Orlowski in the Jarocin district (then known as Jarotschin). From 1943 to 1944, he was a ministerial councilor in the Reich Ministry of the Interior. After the end of the Second World War, he lived in Flensburg, where he died on 3 December 1971.

== Books ==
- Denkschrift: Deutsche Volkstumarbeit als Grenzaufgabe (self-published; Flensburg)
