= Velký Újezd =

- Market town
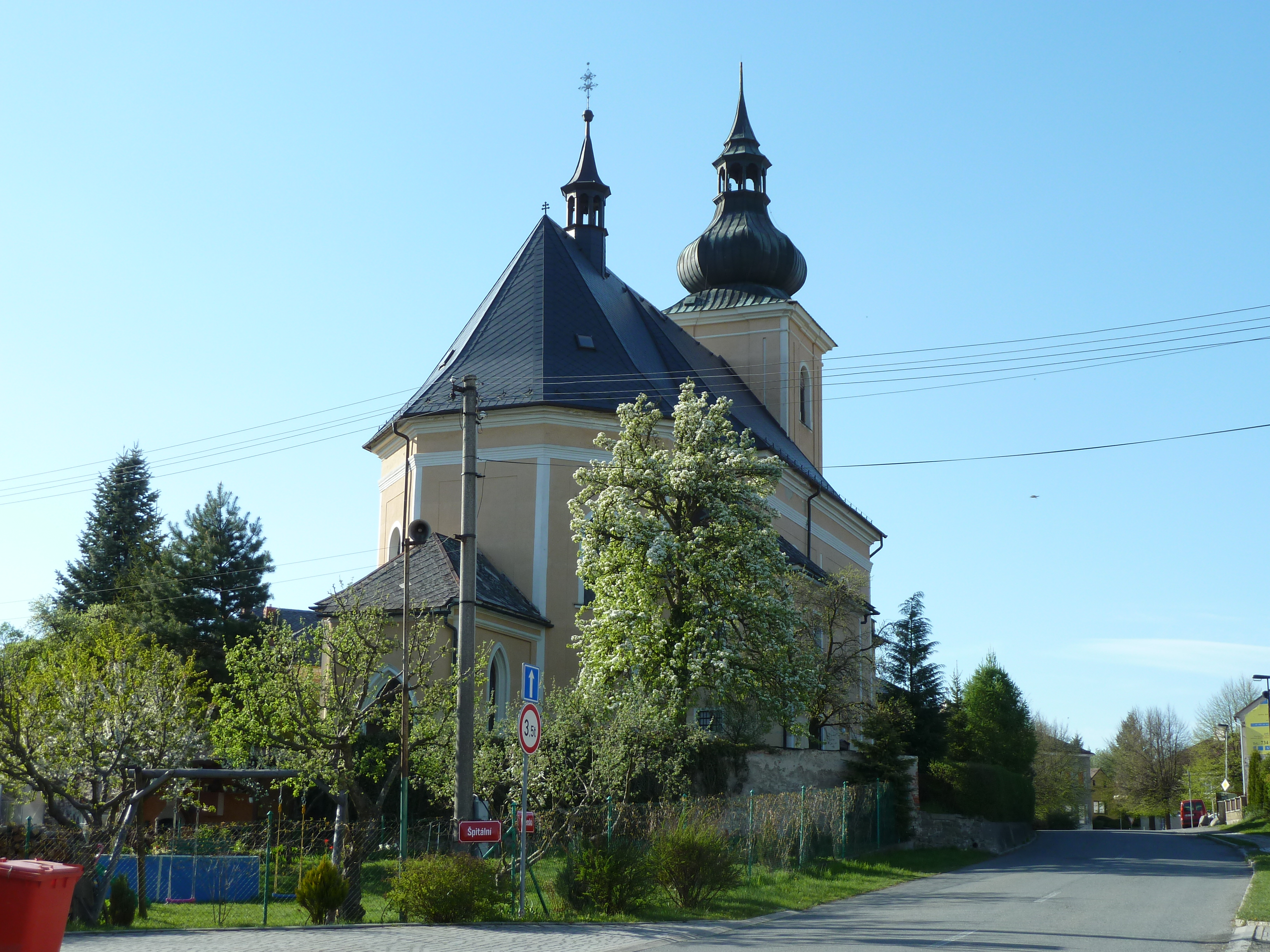
- Church of Saint James the Great

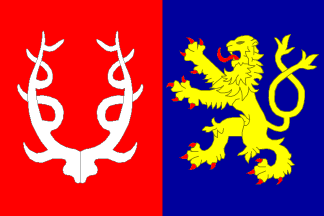
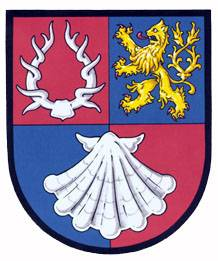
- Flag Coat of arms

- Location in the Czech Republic
- Coordinates: 49°34′42″N 17°28′59″E
- Country: Czech Republic
- Region: Olomouc
- District: Olomouc
- First mentioned: 1301

Area
  - Total: 6.83 km^{2} (2.64 sq mi)
- Elevation: 369 m (1,211 ft)

Population (2026-01-01)
  - Total: 1,415
  - Density: 207/km^{2} (537/sq mi)
- Time zone: UTC+1 (CET)
  - Summer (DST): UTC+2 (CEST)
- Postal code: 783 55
- Website: www.velkyujezd.cz

Velký Újezd (Czech pronunciation: [ˈvɛlkiː ˈuːjɛst]) is a market town in Olomouc District in the Olomouc Region of the Czech Republic. It has about 1,400 inhabitants.

== Geography ==
Velký Újezd is located about 15 kilometres (9 mi) east of Olomouc. It lies in the Nízký Jeseník range. The highest point is at 479 m (1,572 ft) above sea level.

== History ==
The first written mention of Velký Újezd is 1301. In 1381, Velký Újezd is referred to as a market town for the first time. From the end of the 14th century until the 16th century, it belonged to the Helfštýn estate, then it was annexed to the Veselíčko estate. During the Thirty Years' War, Velký Újezd was badly damaged and ceased to be a market town. The next period of prosperity came during the rule of the Podstatský family in the 18th century. In the 19th century, Velký Újezd became a market town again.

== Demographics ==
Historical population

Year	Pop.	±%
1869	1,123	—
1880	1,209	+7.7%
1890	1,259	+4.1%
1900	1,299	+3.2%
1910	1,291	−0.6%

Year	Pop.	±%
1921	1,189	−7.9%
1930	1,208	+1.6%
1950	1,071	−11.3%
1961	1,132	+5.7%
1970	1,081	−4.5%

Year	Pop.	±%
1980	1,016	−6.0%
1991	1,024	+0.8%
2001	1,058	+3.3%
2011	1,290	+21.9%
2021	1,359	+5.3%

Source: Censuses

== Transport ==
The D35 motorway, which connects Olomouc with the D1 motorway, runs through the municipality.

== Sights ==
The main landmark of Velký Újezd is the Church of Saint James the Great. It was built in the Baroque style in 1749–1751.
