= Moravian Gate =

Geographic feature in Czechia

Coordinates: 49°35′9″N 17°45′19″E

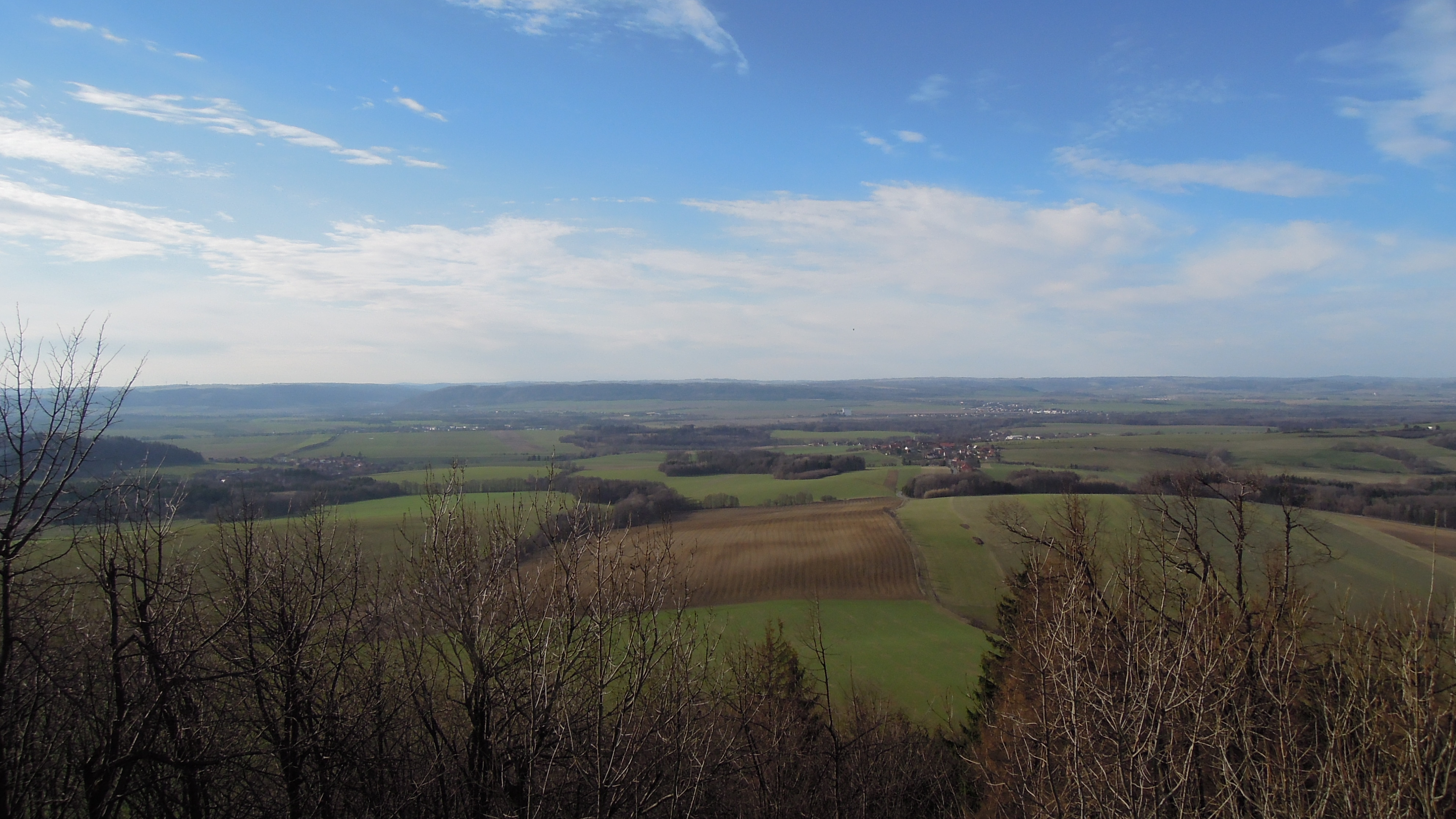
View from Starý Jičín over the Moravian Gate to the Oderské vrchy mountains

The Moravian Gate (Czech: Moravská brána, Polish: Brama Morawska, German: Mährische Pforte, Slovak: Moravská brána) is a geomorphological feature in the Moravian region of the Czech Republic and the Upper Silesia region in Poland. It is formed by the depression between the Carpathian Mountains in the east and the Sudetes in the west. The drainage divide between the upper Oder river and the Baltic Sea in the north and the Bečva River of the Danube basin runs through it.

== Geography ==
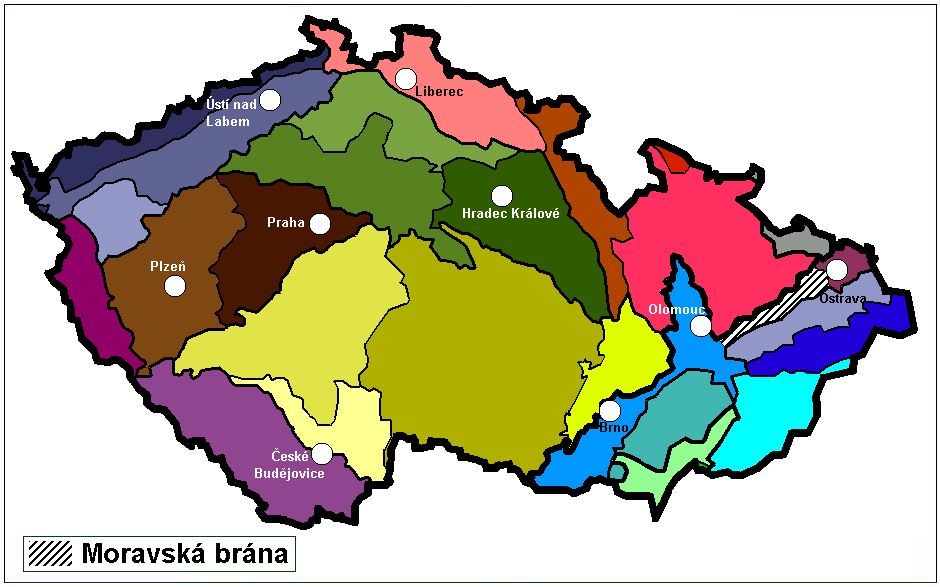
Moravian Gate on a geomorphical map of the Czech Republic

It stretches from Moravia towards Czech Silesia north-eastward in the length of about 50 km (31 mi) and is bordered by the confluence of the Olza and the Odra (Oder) rivers in the north. Its crest is located between the villages of Olšovec and Bělotín at 310 m (1,020 ft). Its average altitude is 270 metres (890 ft).

Because of its low altitude, the Moravian Gate has since ancient times been a natural pass between the Sudetes (Oderské vrchy range) in the northwest and the Western Carpathians (Moravian-Silesian Beskids) in the southeast. Here ran the most important trade routes, such as the Amber Road from the Baltic to the Adriatic coast, as well as roads from the Czech lands to Upper Silesia and Lesser Poland. Today the D1 highway leads from the Moravian capital Brno to Ostrava, the centre of the Moravian-Silesian Region. Further to the north the road reaches the border with Poland near the town of Racibórz and Wodzisław Śląski. The Austrian Northern Railway built in 1847 from Vienna to Bohumín also traverses the Moravian Gate.

== See also ==
- Vyškov Gate
- Outer Subcarpathia
- Danube–Oder Canal
