= Olšovec =

- Municipality
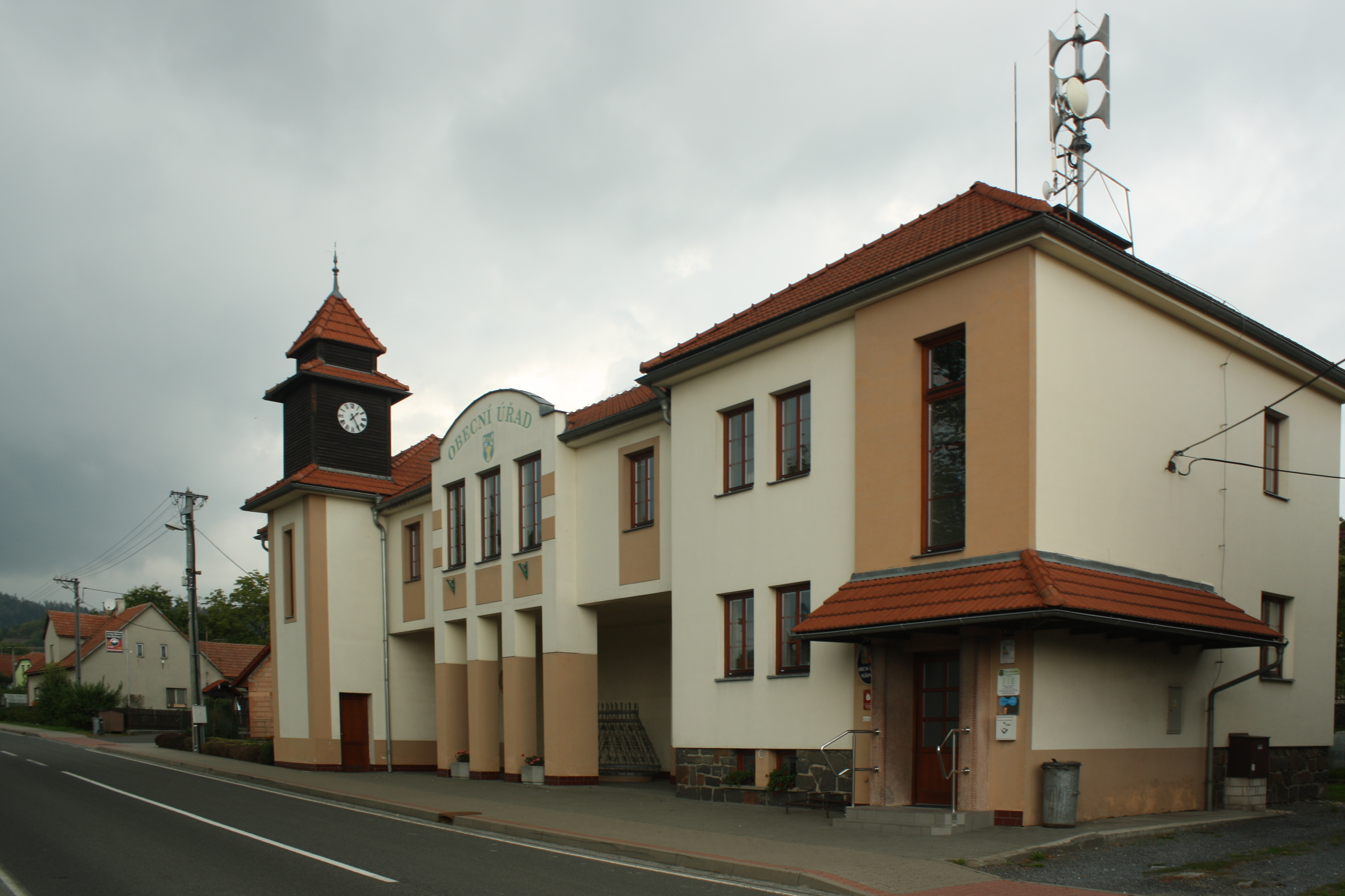
- Municipal office

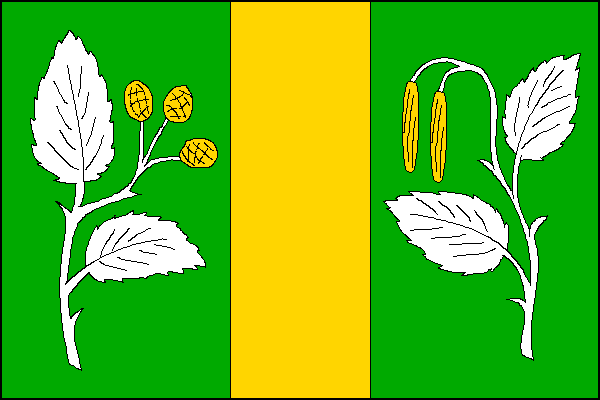
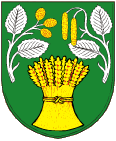
- Flag Coat of arms

- Location in the Czech Republic
- Coordinates: 49°35′24″N 17°43′2″E
- Country: Czech Republic
- Region: Olomouc
- District: Přerov
- First mentioned: 1548

Area
  - Total: 8.31 km^{2} (3.21 sq mi)
- Elevation: 305 m (1,001 ft)

Population (2026-01-01)
  - Total: 526
  - Density: 63.3/km^{2} (164/sq mi)
- Time zone: UTC+1 (CET)
  - Summer (DST): UTC+2 (CEST)
- Postal code: 753 01
- Website: www.obecolsovec.cz

Olšovec (German: Olspitz) is a municipality and village in Přerov District in the Olomouc Region of the Czech Republic. It has about 500 inhabitants.

Olšovec lies approximately 25 kilometres (16 mi) north-east of Přerov, 34 km (21 mi) east of Olomouc, and 243 km (151 mi) east of Prague.

== Administrative division ==
Olšovec consists of two municipal parts (in brackets population according to the 2021 census):

- Olšovec (472)
- Boňkov (33)

== Demographics ==
Historical population
Year	Pop.	±%
1869	536	—
1880	563	+5.0%
1890	631	+12.1%
1900	536	−15.1%
1910	597	+11.4%
1921	548	−8.2%
1930	593	+8.2%
1950	441	−25.6%
1961	527	+19.5%
1970	470	−10.8%
1980	465	−1.1%
1991	447	−3.9%
2001	452	+1.1%
2011	474	+4.9%
2021	505	+6.5%
Source: Censuses
