= Jívová =

- Municipality
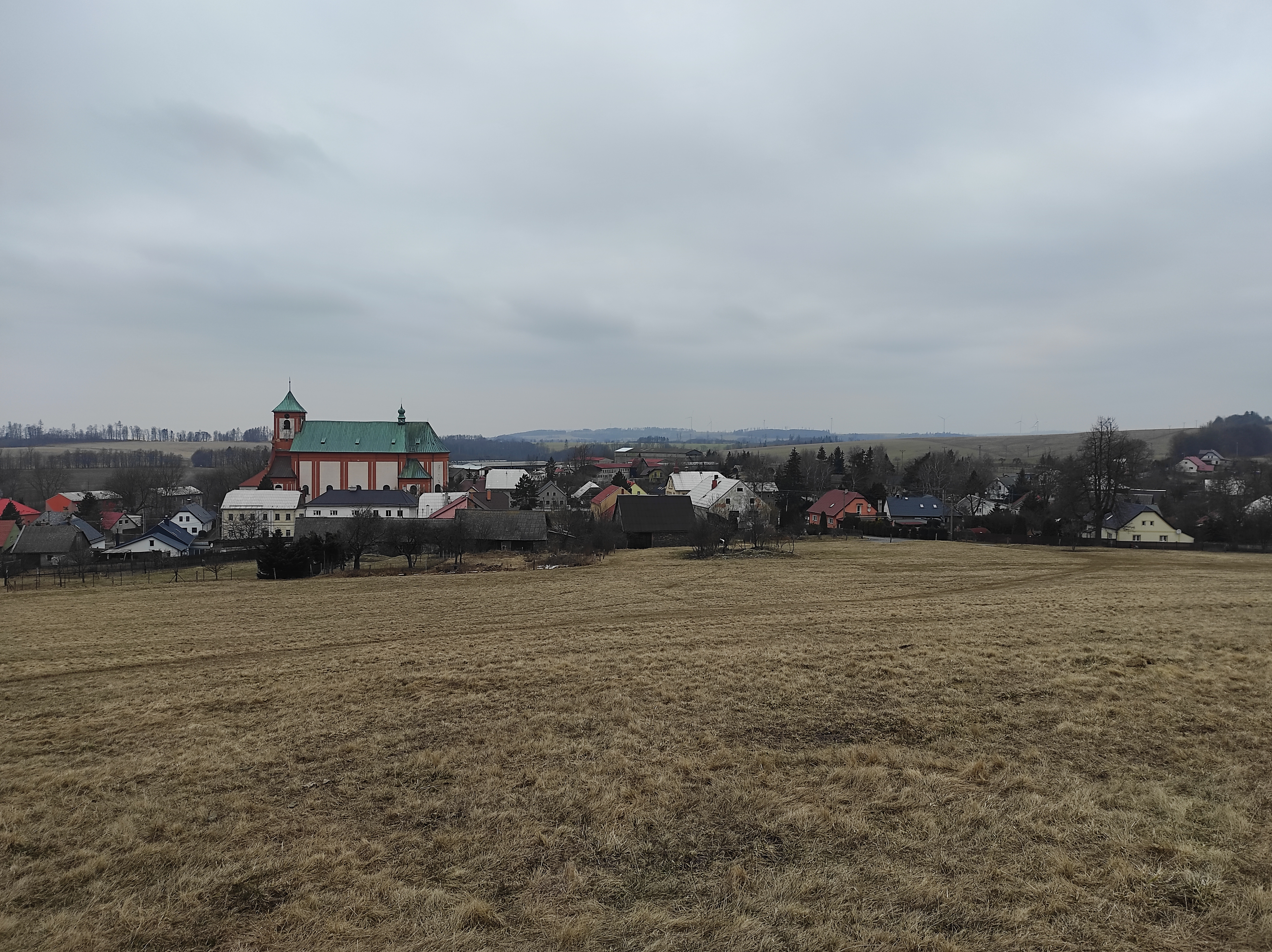
- General view

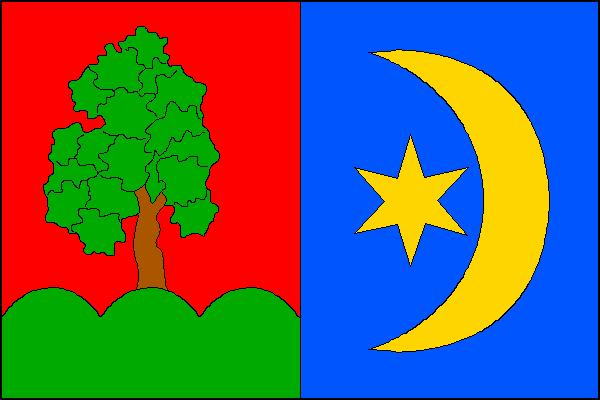
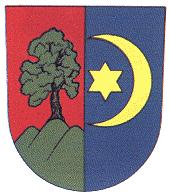
- Flag Coat of arms

- Location in the Czech Republic
- Coordinates: 49°42′33″N 17°23′41″E
- Country: Czech Republic
- Region: Olomouc
- District: Olomouc
- First mentioned: 1269

Area
  - Total: 15.28 km^{2} (5.90 sq mi)
- Elevation: 561 m (1,841 ft)

Population (2026-01-01)
  - Total: 644
  - Density: 42.1/km^{2} (109/sq mi)
- Time zone: UTC+1 (CET)
  - Summer (DST): UTC+2 (CEST)
- Postal code: 783 16
- Website: www.obecjivova.cz

Jívová (German: Giebau) is a municipality and village in Olomouc District in the Olomouc Region of the Czech Republic. It has about 600 inhabitants.

Jívová lies approximately 17 kilometres (11 mi) north-east of Olomouc and 218 km (135 mi) east of Prague.

== Demographics ==
Historical population
Year	Pop.	±%
1869	1,966	—
1880	1,880	−4.4%
1890	1,912	+1.7%
1900	1,816	−5.0%
1910	1,768	−2.6%
1921	1,511	−14.5%
1930	1,553	+2.8%
1950	718	−53.8%
1961	748	+4.2%
1970	635	−15.1%
1980	609	−4.1%
1991	532	−12.6%
2001	530	−0.4%
2011	563	+6.2%
2021	570	+1.2%
Source: Censuses
