= Bystrovany =

- Municipality
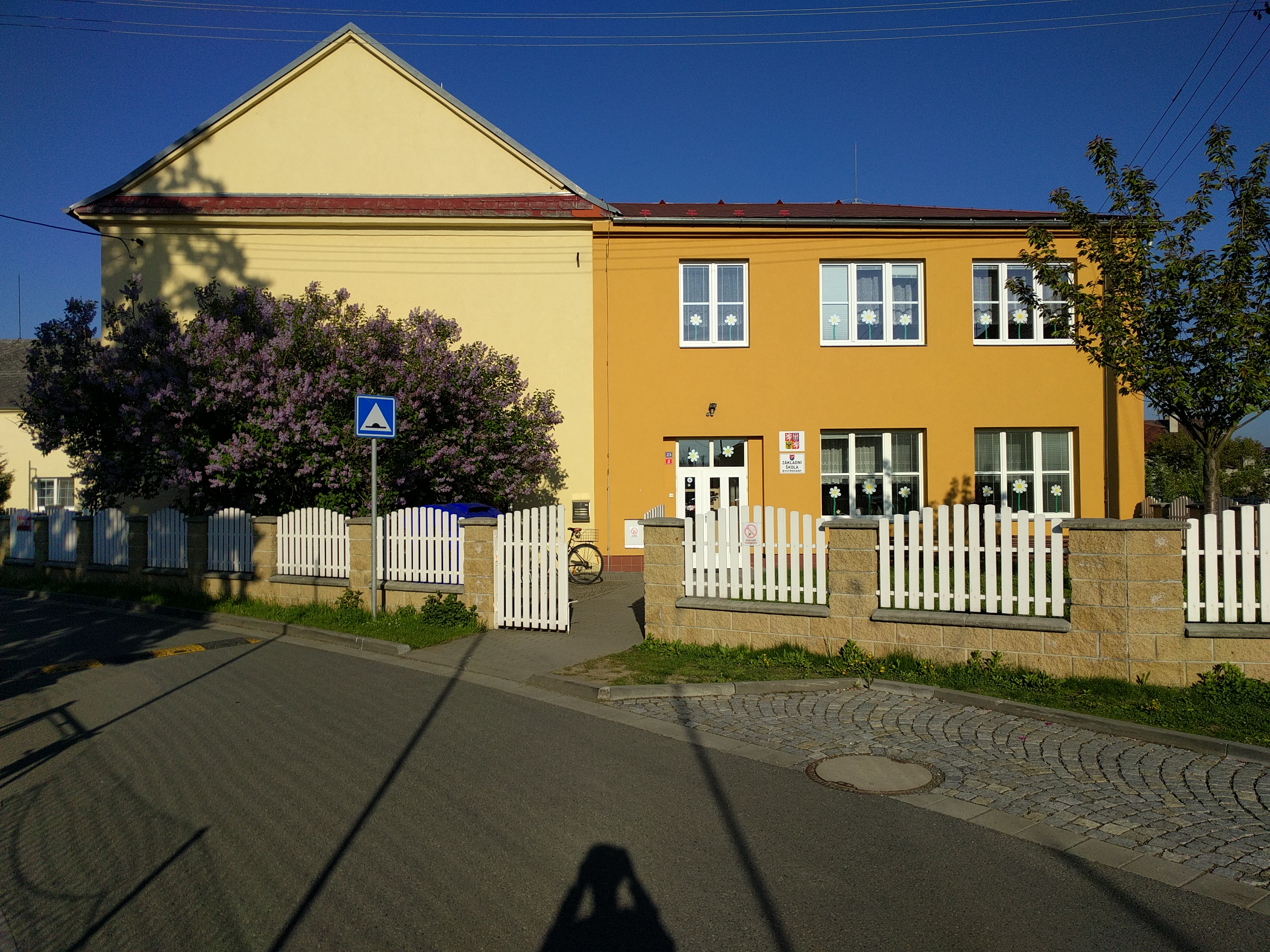
- Primary school

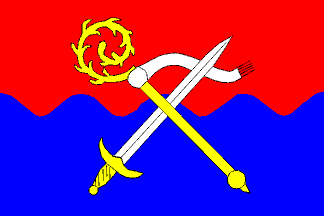
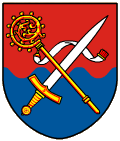
- Flag Coat of arms

- Location in the Czech Republic
- Coordinates: 49°35′49″N 17°19′25″E
- Country: Czech Republic
- Region: Olomouc
- District: Olomouc
- First mentioned: 1277

Area
  - Total: 3.51 km^{2} (1.36 sq mi)
- Elevation: 231 m (758 ft)

Population (2026-01-01)
  - Total: 977
  - Density: 278/km^{2} (721/sq mi)
- Time zone: UTC+1 (CET)
  - Summer (DST): UTC+2 (CEST)
- Postal code: 779 00
- Website: www.bystrovany.cz

Bystrovany is a municipality and village in Olomouc District in the Olomouc Region of the Czech Republic. It has about 1,000 inhabitants.

Bystrovany lies approximately 5 kilometres (3 mi) east of Olomouc and 216 km (134 mi) east of Prague.

== Demographics ==
Historical population
Year	Pop.	±%
1869	355	—
1880	360	+1.4%
1890	478	+32.8%
1900	599	+25.3%
1910	623	+4.0%
1921	699	+12.2%
1930	892	+27.6%
1950	663	−25.7%
1961	685	+3.3%
1970	639	−6.7%
1980	649	+1.6%
1991	627	−3.4%
2001	676	+7.8%
2011	985	+45.7%
2021	979	−0.6%
Source: Censuses

== Notable people ==
- Jarmila Šťastná (1932–2015), speed skater and figure skater
