= Hraničné Petrovice =

- Municipality
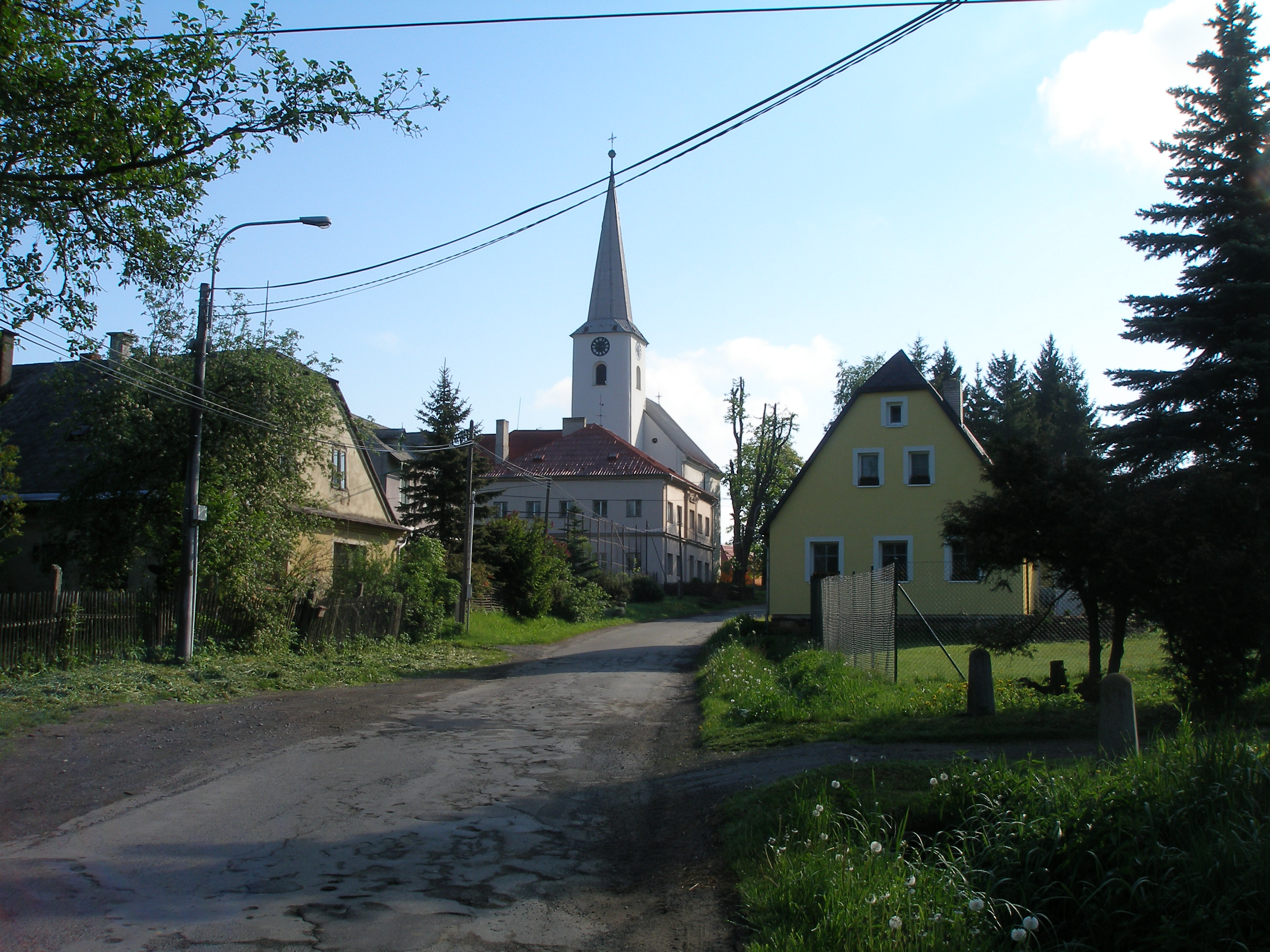
- Church of Saints Peter and Paul

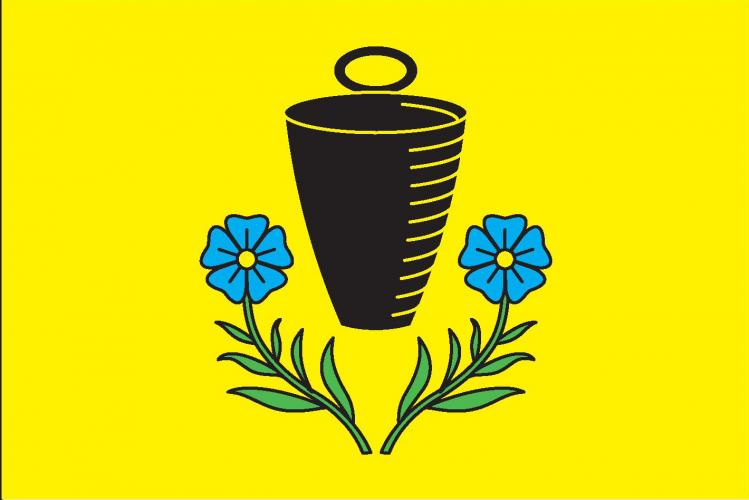
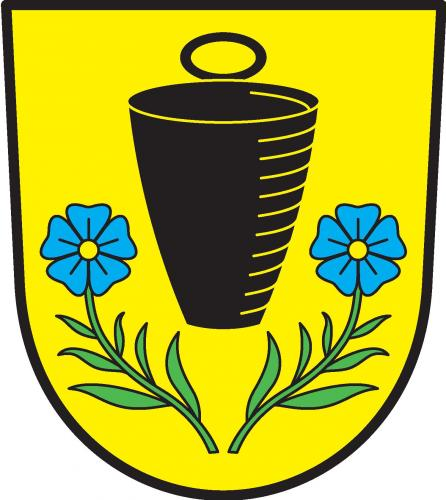
- Flag Coat of arms

- Location in the Czech Republic
- Coordinates: 49°44′27″N 17°24′18″E
- Country: Czech Republic
- Region: Olomouc
- District: Olomouc
- First mentioned: 1353

Area
  - Total: 12.17 km^{2} (4.70 sq mi)
- Elevation: 587 m (1,926 ft)

Population (2026-01-01)
  - Total: 136
  - Density: 11.2/km^{2} (28.9/sq mi)
- Time zone: UTC+1 (CET)
  - Summer (DST): UTC+2 (CEST)
- Postal code: 783 06
- Website: www.hranicnepetrovice.cz

Hraničné Petrovice (German: Petersdorf) is a municipality and village in Olomouc District in the Olomouc Region of the Czech Republic. It has about 100 inhabitants.

Hraničné Petrovice lies approximately 19 kilometres (12 mi) north-east of Olomouc and 217 km (135 mi) east of Prague.

== Demographics ==
Historical population
Year	Pop.	±%
1869	469	—
1880	470	+0.2%
1890	435	−7.4%
1900	462	+6.2%
1910	468	+1.3%
1921	446	−4.7%
1930	393	−11.9%
1950	251	−36.1%
1961	253	+0.8%
1970	240	−5.1%
1980	205	−14.6%
1991	164	−20.0%
2001	148	−9.8%
2011	134	−9.5%
2021	133	−0.7%
Source: Censuses
