= Moravský Beroun =

- Town
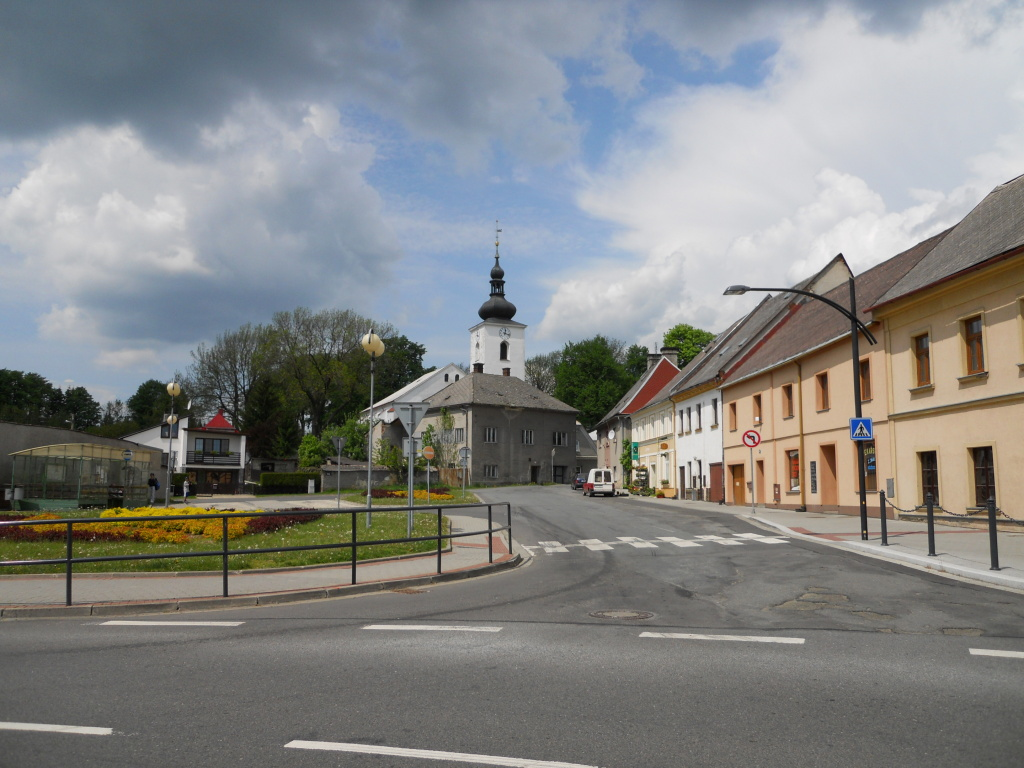
- Centre of Moravský Beroun

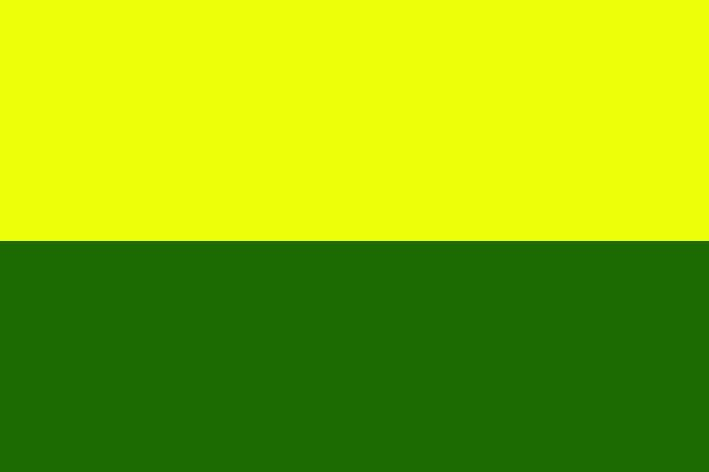
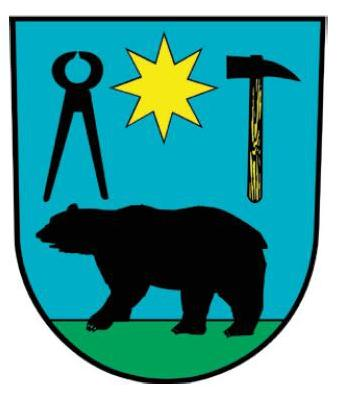
- Flag Coat of arms

- Location in the Czech Republic
- Coordinates: 49°47′37″N 17°26′32″E
- Country: Czech Republic
- Region: Olomouc
- District: Olomouc
- First mentioned: 1339

Government
  - Mayor: Jan Hicz

Area
  - Total: 51.22 km^{2} (19.78 sq mi)
- Elevation: 525 m (1,722 ft)

Population (2026-01-01)
  - Total: 2,775
  - Density: 54.18/km^{2} (140.3/sq mi)
- Time zone: UTC+1 (CET)
  - Summer (DST): UTC+2 (CEST)
- Postal code: 793 05
- Website: www.morberoun.cz

Moravský Beroun (Czech pronunciation: [ˈmorafskiː ˈbɛroun]; until 1924 Beroun, German: Bärn) is a town in Olomouc District in the Olomouc Region of the Czech Republic. It has about 2,800 inhabitants. The town is located on the Bystřice River in the Nízký Jeseník range.

The main landmark of Moravský Beroun is the Church of the Assumption of the Virgin Mary from the early 17th century. Ondrášov, a part of Moravský Beroun, is known for the Ondrášovka mineral water.

== Administrative division ==
Moravský Beroun consists of five municipal parts (in brackets population according to the 2021 census):

- Moravský Beroun (2,549)
- Čabová (29)
- Nové Valteřice (30)
- Ondrášov (82)
- Sedm Dvorů (95)

== Geography ==
Moravský Beroun is located about 25 kilometres (16 mi) northeast of Olomouc. It lies in the Nízký Jeseník range. The highest point is at 760 m (2,490 ft) above sea level. The Bystřice River flows through the municipal territory.

== History ==
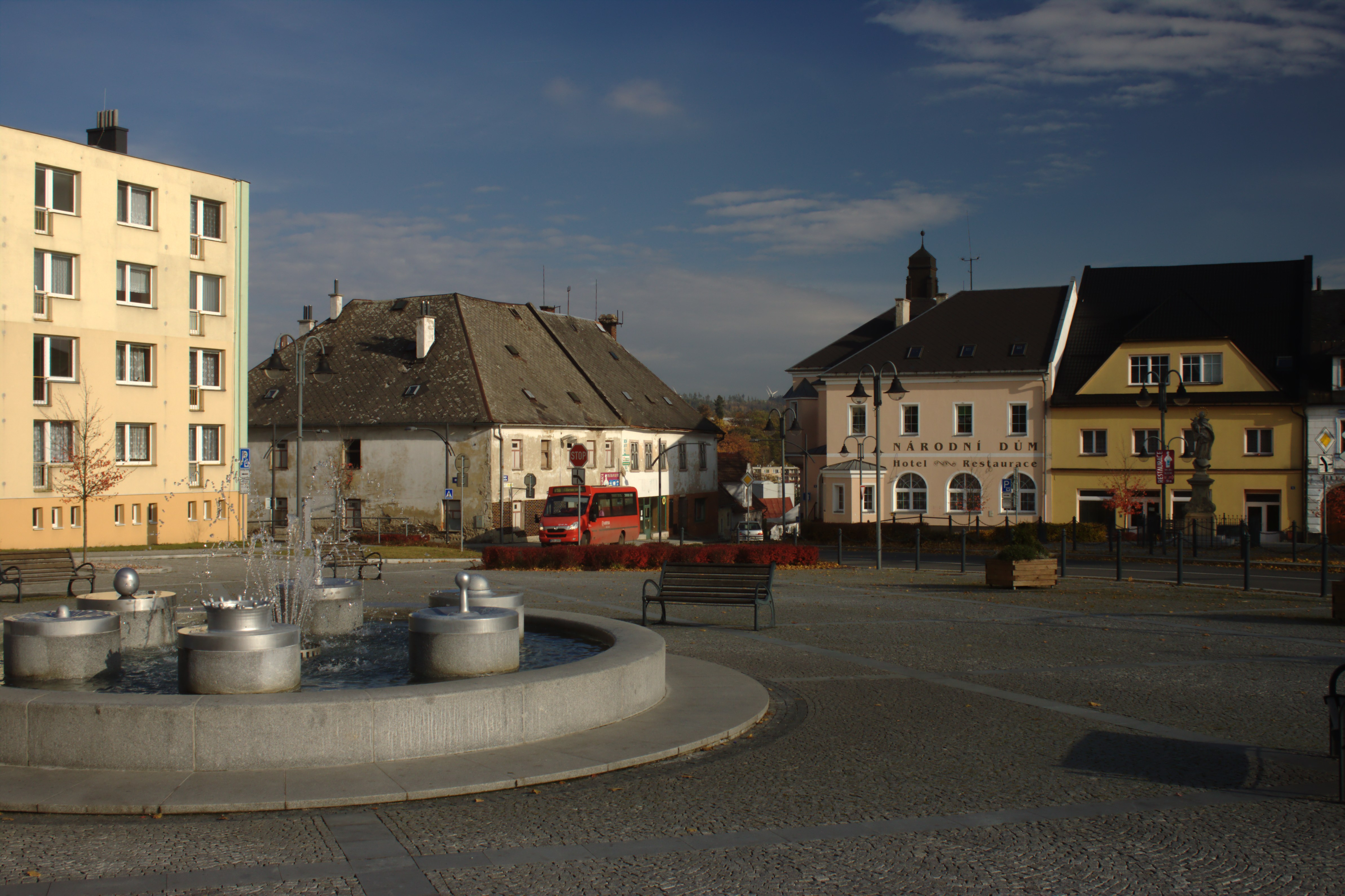
Main square

The first written mention of Beroun is from 1339. It was already referred to as a town and most likely was founded earlier. During the German colonisation in the second half of the 16th century, the town became a centre of iron ore mining and processing.

Beroun suffered during the Thirty Years' War. The town did not recover until the end of the 18th century, when weaving production and textile industry were established. In 1872, the railway was built.

In 1938, after the Munich Agreement, the town was annexed by Nazi Germany and administered as part of the Reichsgau Sudetenland. The German-speaking population was expelled in 1945 according to the Beneš decrees and replaced by Czech settlers.

== Demographics ==
Historical population

Year	Pop.	±%
1869	5,255	—
1880	5,427	+3.3%
1890	5,409	−0.3%
1900	5,319	−1.7%
1910	4,879	−8.3%

Year	Pop.	±%
1921	4,439	−9.0%
1930	4,326	−2.5%
1950	2,635	−39.1%
1961	2,834	+7.6%
1970	2,956	+4.3%

Year	Pop.	±%
1980	2,827	−4.4%
1991	3,523	+24.6%
2001	3,431	−2.6%
2011	3,004	−12.4%
2021	2,785	−7.3%

Source: Censuses

== Economy ==
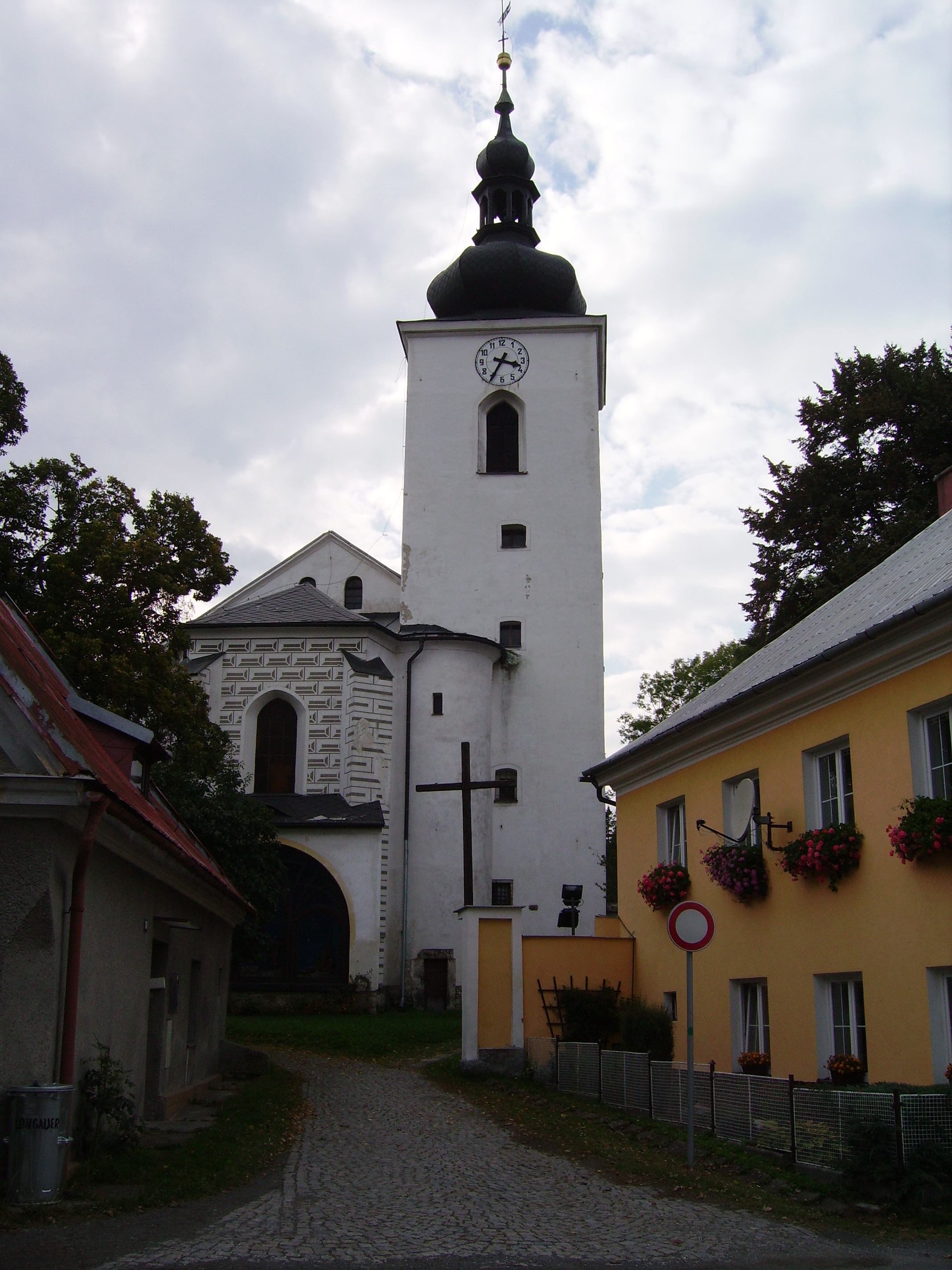
Church of the Assumption of the Virgin Mary

A mineral spring was discovered in 1260 in the village of Ondrášov. The water was declared curative in 1357. A factory for bottling of the mineral water known under the name Ondrášovka was founded in the early 20th century.

The successor of the textile industry was the company Granitol, which today deals mainly with the production of plastic technical and packaging foils and welded products from these foils. It is currently the largest manufacturer in its field in the Czech Republic.

== Transport ==
The I/46 road from Olomouc to Opava runs through the town.

Moravský Beroun is located on the railway line Ostrava–Olomouc.

== Sights ==
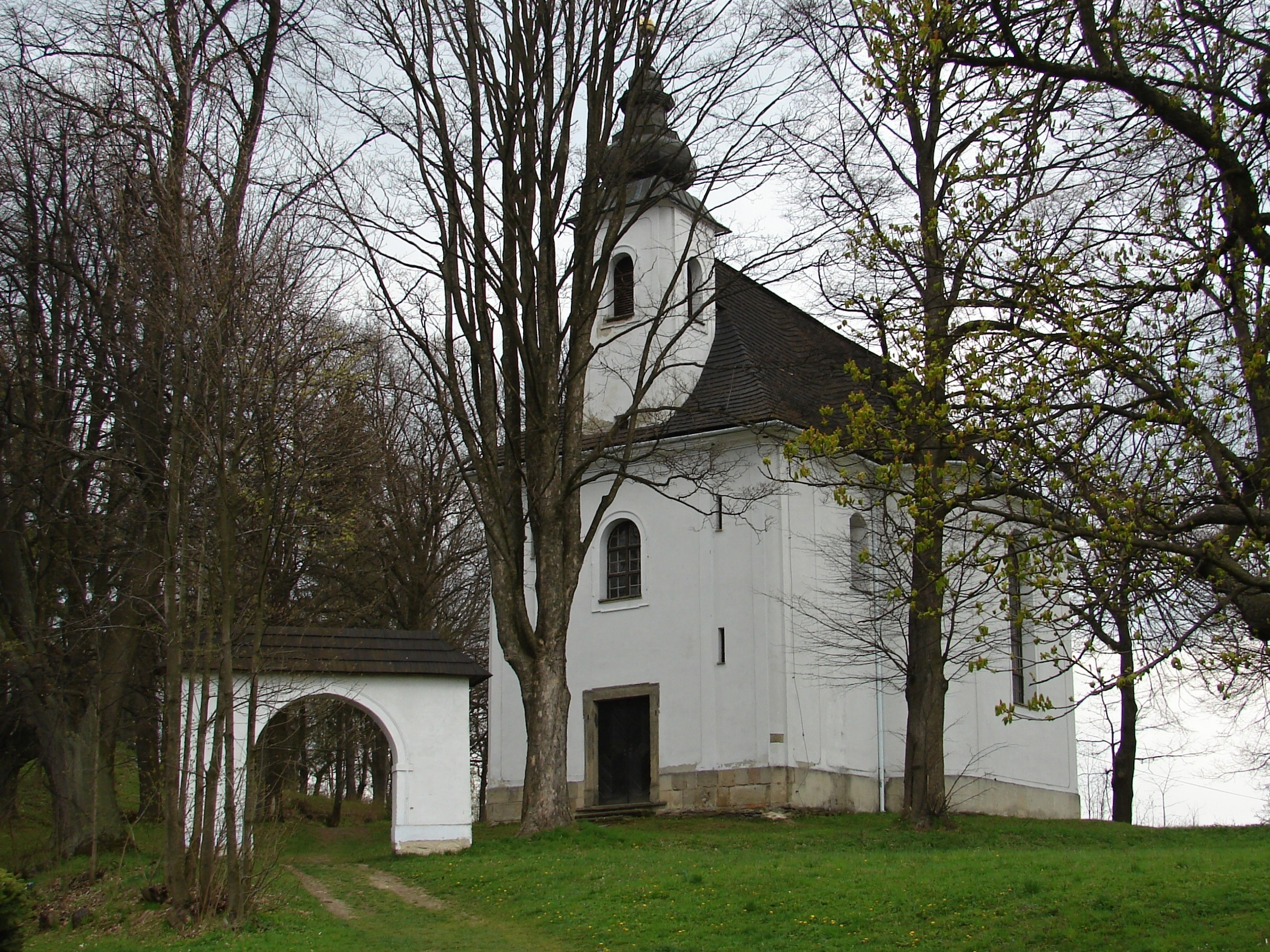
Church of the Exaltation of the Holy Cross

The main landmark of the town centre is the Church of the Assumption of the Virgin Mary. It is a Renaissance building of the early 17th century with a set of sepulchral monuments from the second half of the 19th and the beginning of the 20th century.

A tourist destination is the hill Křížový vrch with a romantically landscaped park. The area of the park includes the Church of the Exaltation of the Holy Cross, fourteen Stations of the Cross and ruin of the Moravský Beroun Castle. The Gothic castle dates from the 14th century; the Baroque church and stations dates from the mid-18th century.

The second church dedicated to the Assumption of the Virgin Mary is located in Nové Valteřice. It was built in 1811–1815.

A cultural monument is the hunting lodge in Nové Valteřice. It is a rare example of the early use of iron in architecture as a structural material in the region. It was bought in Exposition des produits de l'industrie française in 1848 and imported here.

== Notable people ==
- Ernst Späth (1886–1946), Austrian chemist

== Twin towns – sister cities ==
Moravský Beroun is twinned with:

- Bieruń, Poland
- Gundelfingen, Germany
- Meung-sur-Loire, France
- Ostroh, Ukraine
- Scheibenberg, Germany
- Teplička nad Váhom, Slovakia
