= Nízký Jeseník =

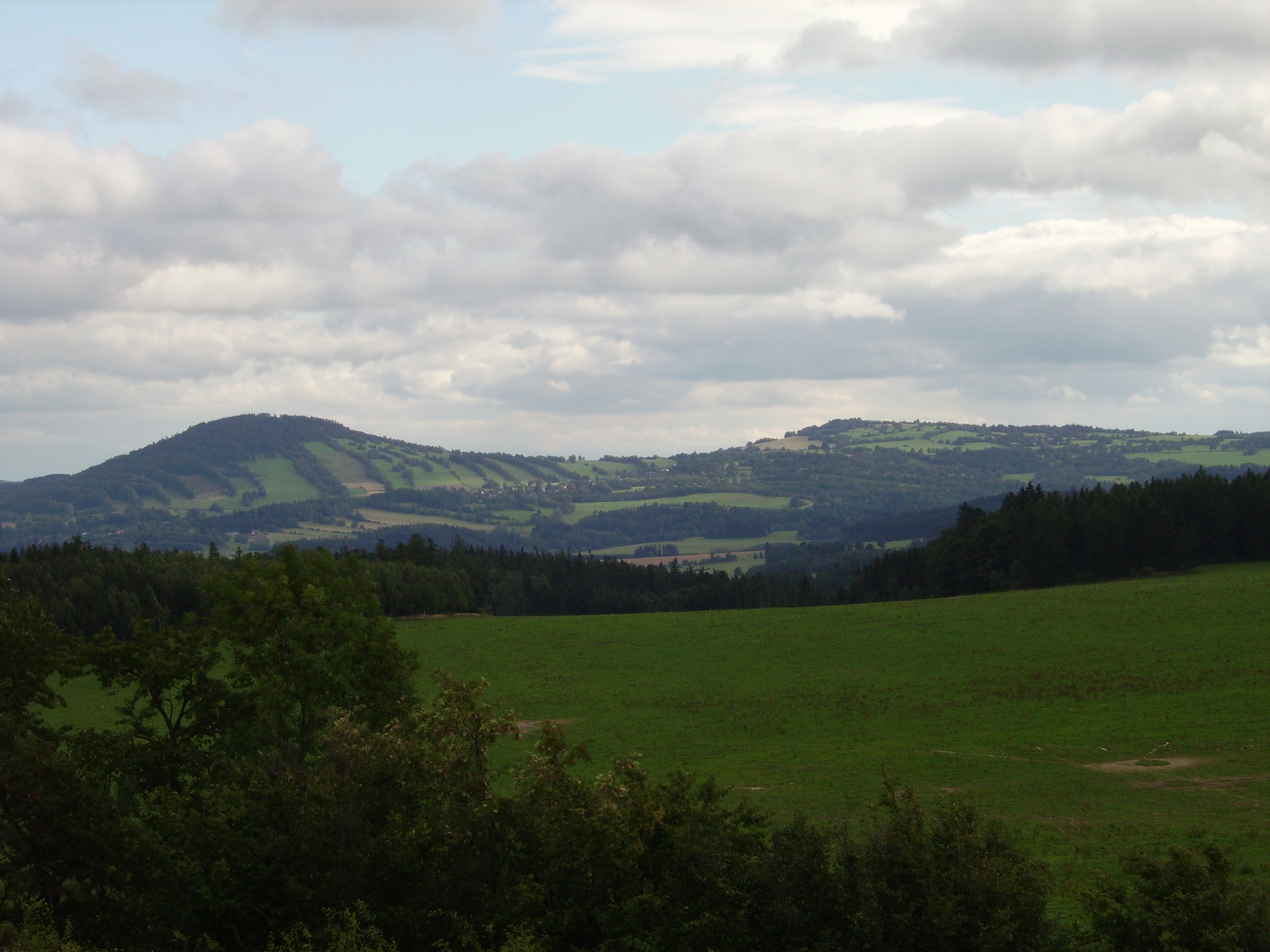
- Velký Roudný and Malý Roudný mountains

Highest point
- Peak: Slunečná
- Elevation: 802 m (2,631 ft)

Dimensions
- Area: 2,894 km^{2} (1,117 mi^{2})

Geography
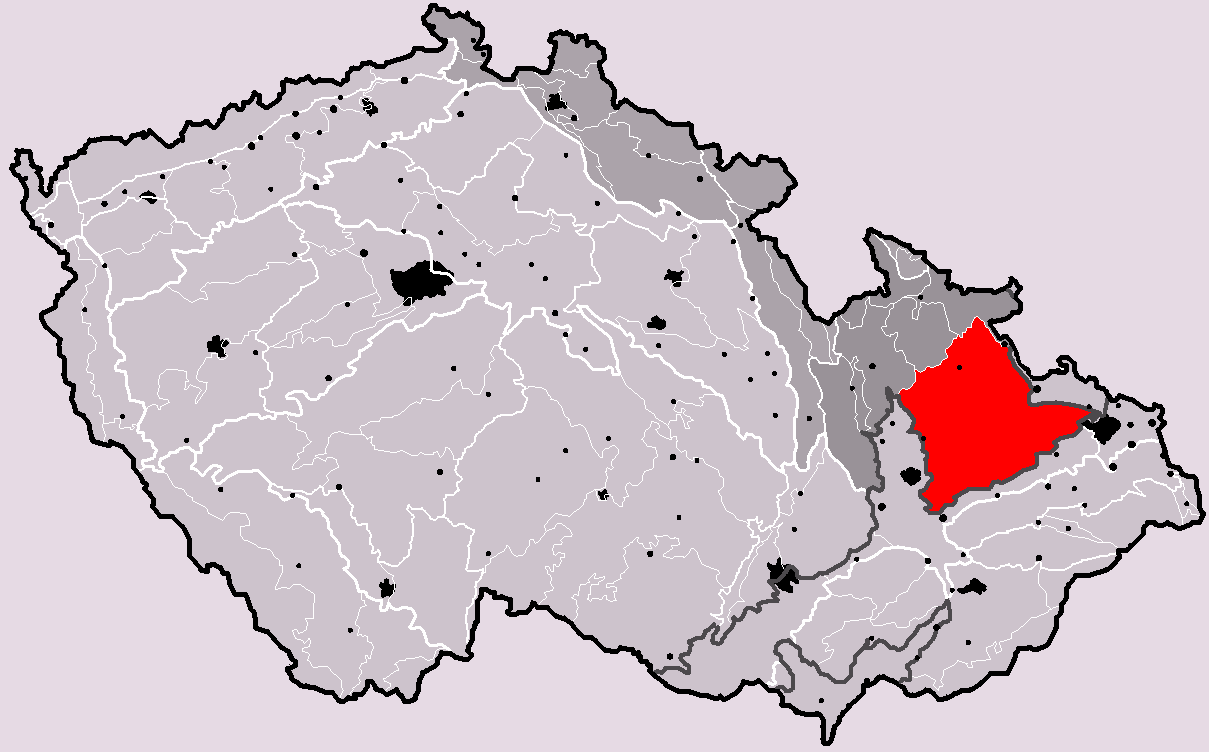
- Nízký Jeseník in the geomorphological system of the Czech Republic
- Country: Czech Republic
- Regions: Olomouc, Moravian-Silesian
- Range coordinates: 49°45′N 17°35′E
- Parent range: Eastern Sudetes

Geology
- Rock type(s): Slate, greywacke

Nízký Jeseník (German: Niederes Gesenke) is a flat highland and geomorphological mesoregion of the Czech Republic. It is located in the east of the country in the Olomouc and Moravian-Silesian regions. It is known for the former volcanic activity. With an area of 2,894 km^{2} (1,117 sq mi), Nízký Jeseník is the largest Czech geomorphological mesoregion.

== Etymology ==
According to the most probable theory, the name has its origin in the word jasan, i.e. 'ash'. Jeseník (respectively Jesenný potok) was first the name of a stream that flowed through an ash forest in a valley. The name was Germanized to Gesenke (i.e. 'slope') and used as a name of a small town that was founded in the valley (but later disappeared), and then it was transferred first to the valley, and then to the whole mountain range. Later the name was changed back to Czech Jeseník. Jeseníky (plural form of Jeseník) is a collective term for an area that includes the mountain ranges of Nízký Jeseník (i.e. 'low Jeseník') and Hrubý Jeseník (literally 'rough Jeseník').

== Geomorphology ==
Nízký Jeseník is a mesoregion of the Eastern Sudetes, which is part of the Sudetes within the Bohemian Massif. It is described as a flat highland or low mountain range with an altitude that most often ranges between 400 and 600 metres above sea level.

It is bordered with the Hrubý Jeseník and Zlatohorská Highlands in the north, with the Upper Morava Valley in the west, with the Moravian Gate in the south, and with the Opava Hilly Land and Ostrava Basin in the east.

Nízký Jeseník is further subdivided into the microregions of Brantice Highlands, Bruntál Highlands, Domašov Highlands, Oderské vrchy, Slunečná Highlands, Stěbořice Highlands, Vítkov Highlands and Tršice Hills.

Nízký Jeseník includes the best-preserved extinct volcanoes in Moravia. The highest peaks are:

- Slunečná, 802 m (2,631 ft)
- Pastviny, 790 m (2,590 ft)
- Kančí vrch, 786 m (2,579 ft)
- Velký Roudný, 781 m (2,562 ft)
- Kamenná hůrka, 778 m (2,552 ft)
- Malý Roudný, 771 m (2,530 ft)
- Ptáčník, 768 m (2,520 ft)
- Rychtář, 753 m (2,470 ft)
- Červená hora, 749 m (2,457 ft)
- Bedřichova hora, 745 m (2,444 ft)

== Geology ==
Nízký Jeseník originated in the older Proterozoic. Geologically, it is one of the oldest mountain ranges in the Czech Republic.

In the Quaternary, there were five active stratovolcanoes, including Velký Roudný, Malý Roudný, Uhlířský vrch, Venušina sopka and Červená hora. With an age of 1.5 million years, these are the youngest volcanoes in the Czech Republic.

== Geography ==
The territory roughly stretches from Olomouc (southwest) to Ostrava (east), and to Krnov (north). Nízký Jeseník has an area of 2,894 square kilometres (1,117 sq mi) and an average elevation of 482.5 metres (1,583 ft). It is the largest mesoregion and mountain range in the country.

The most notable river in the territory are the Oder, which originates in the Oderské vrchy, the Moravice, where the reservoirs Kružberk and Slezská Harta are built, and the Opava, whose upper course flows through the north of the territory. The Bystřice also originates there and drains the southwestern part of the range.

Just beyond the borders are several larger cities, but right in the territory, despite its size, there are not many. A significant part of Nízký Jeseník belongs to the Libavá Military Training Area. The most populated settlements entirely located in Nízký Jeseník are Bruntál, Odry, Vítkov and Fulnek, and partly located in the territory are Krnov, Šternberk and Bílovec.

== Gallery ==
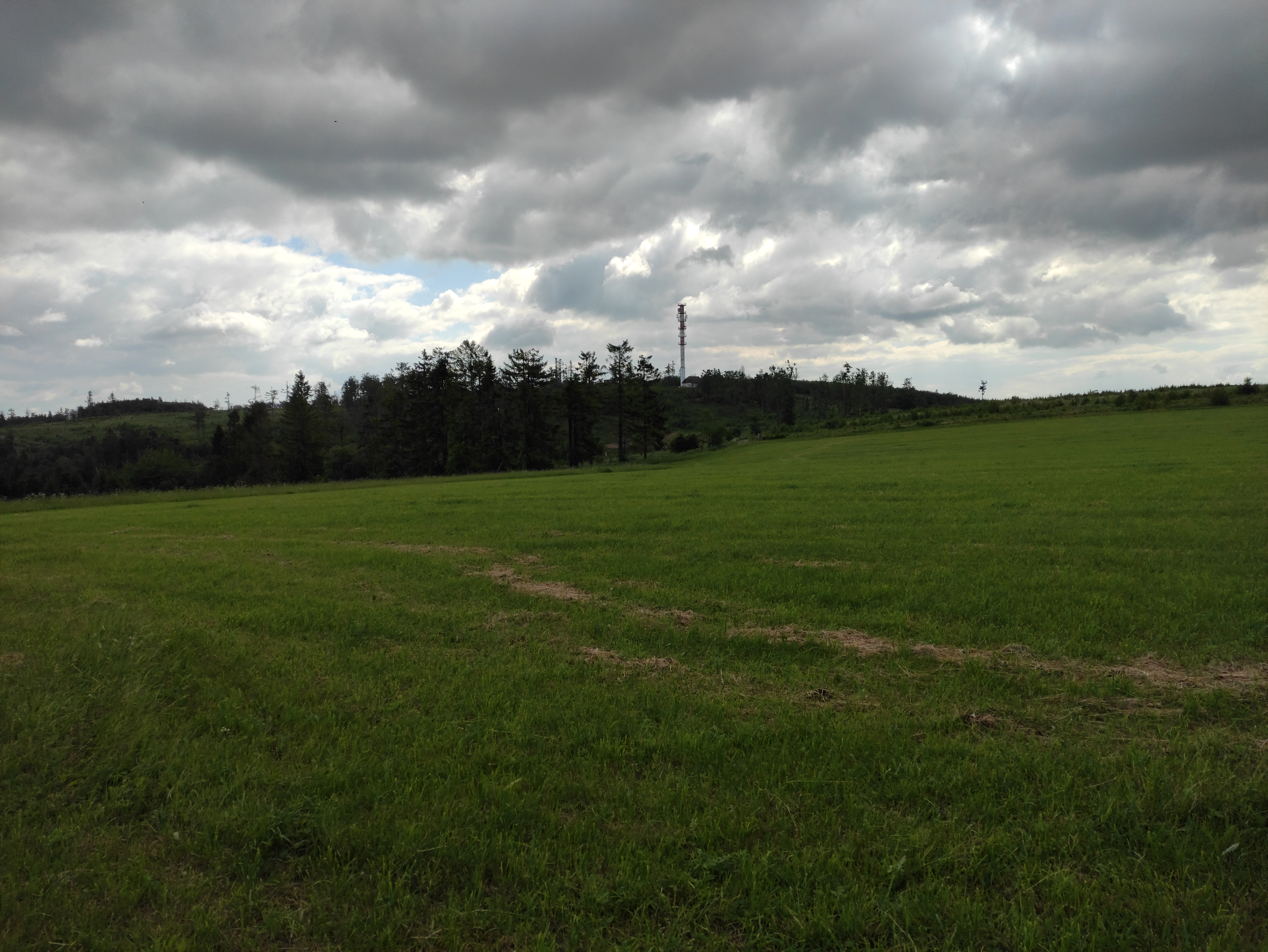
Červená hora

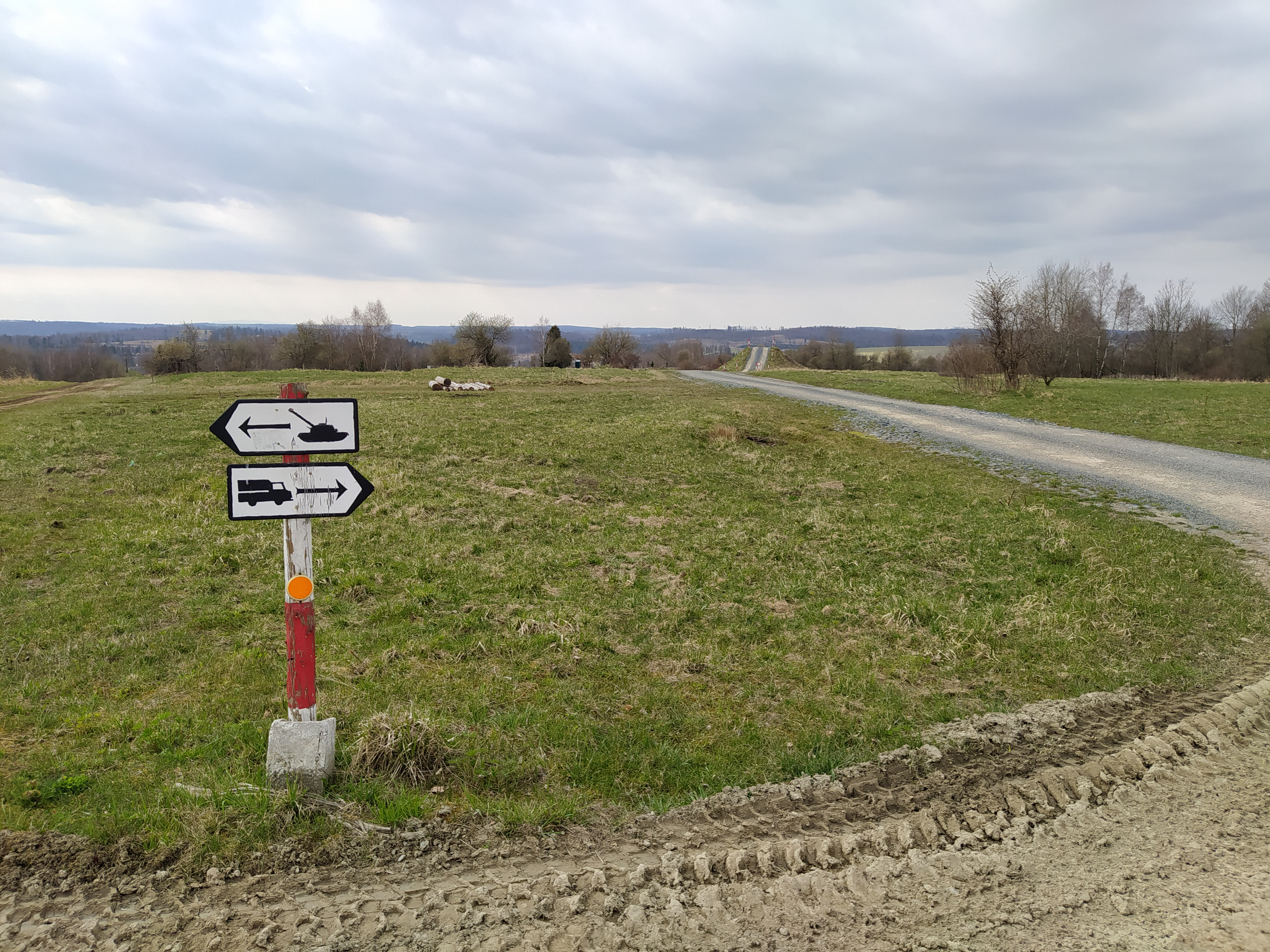
Military Training Area Libavá

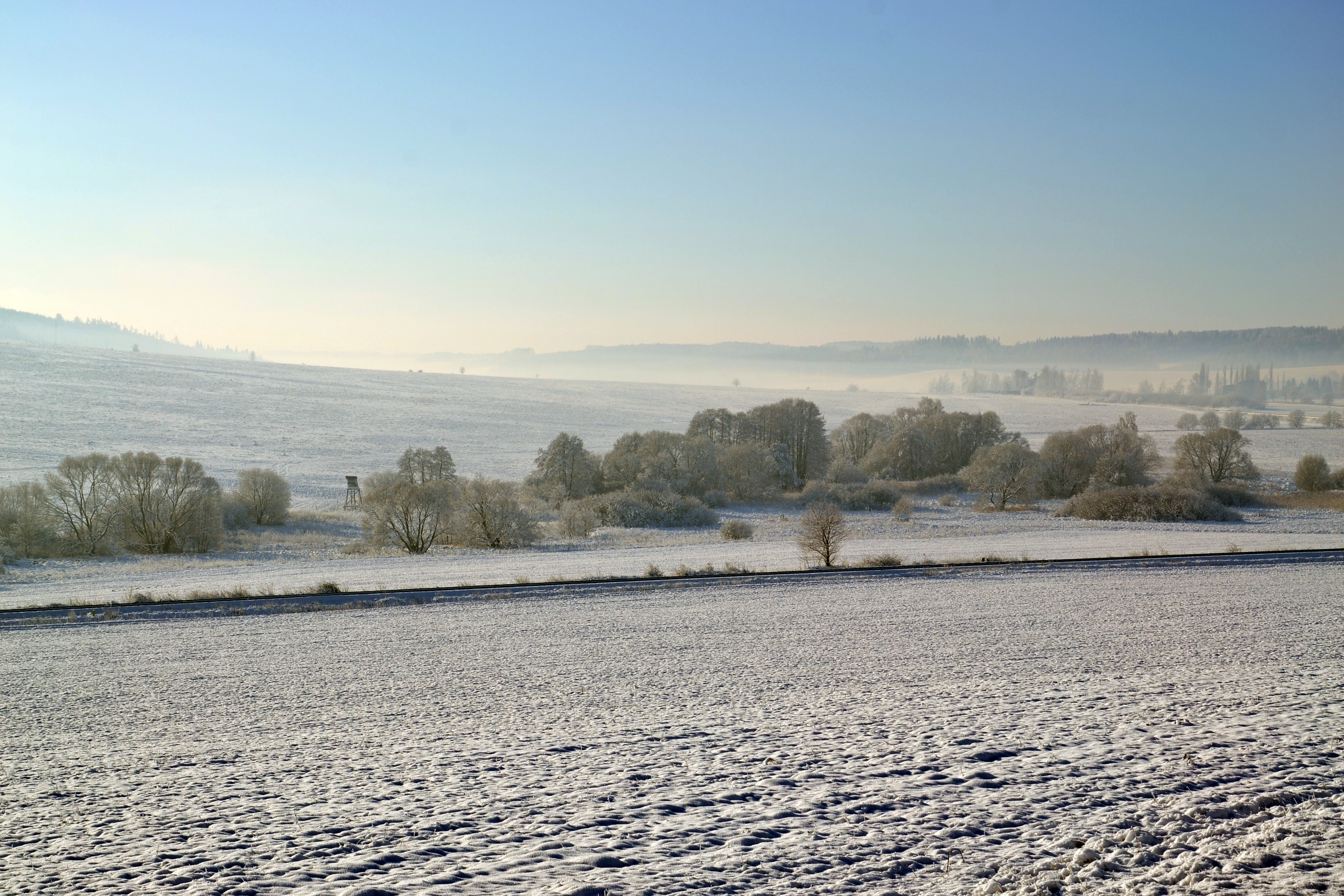
Fields near Bruntál

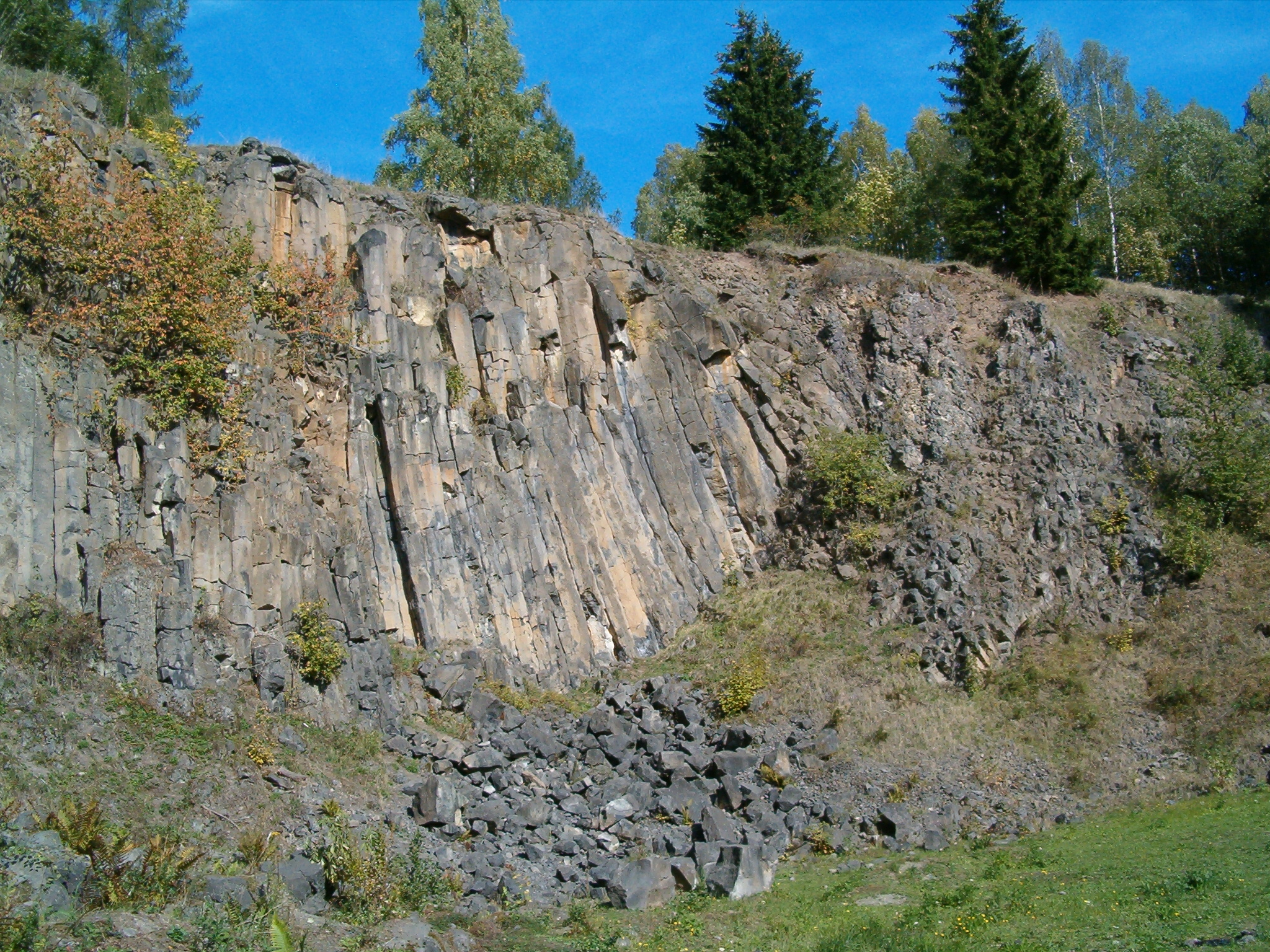
Lava flow near Mezina

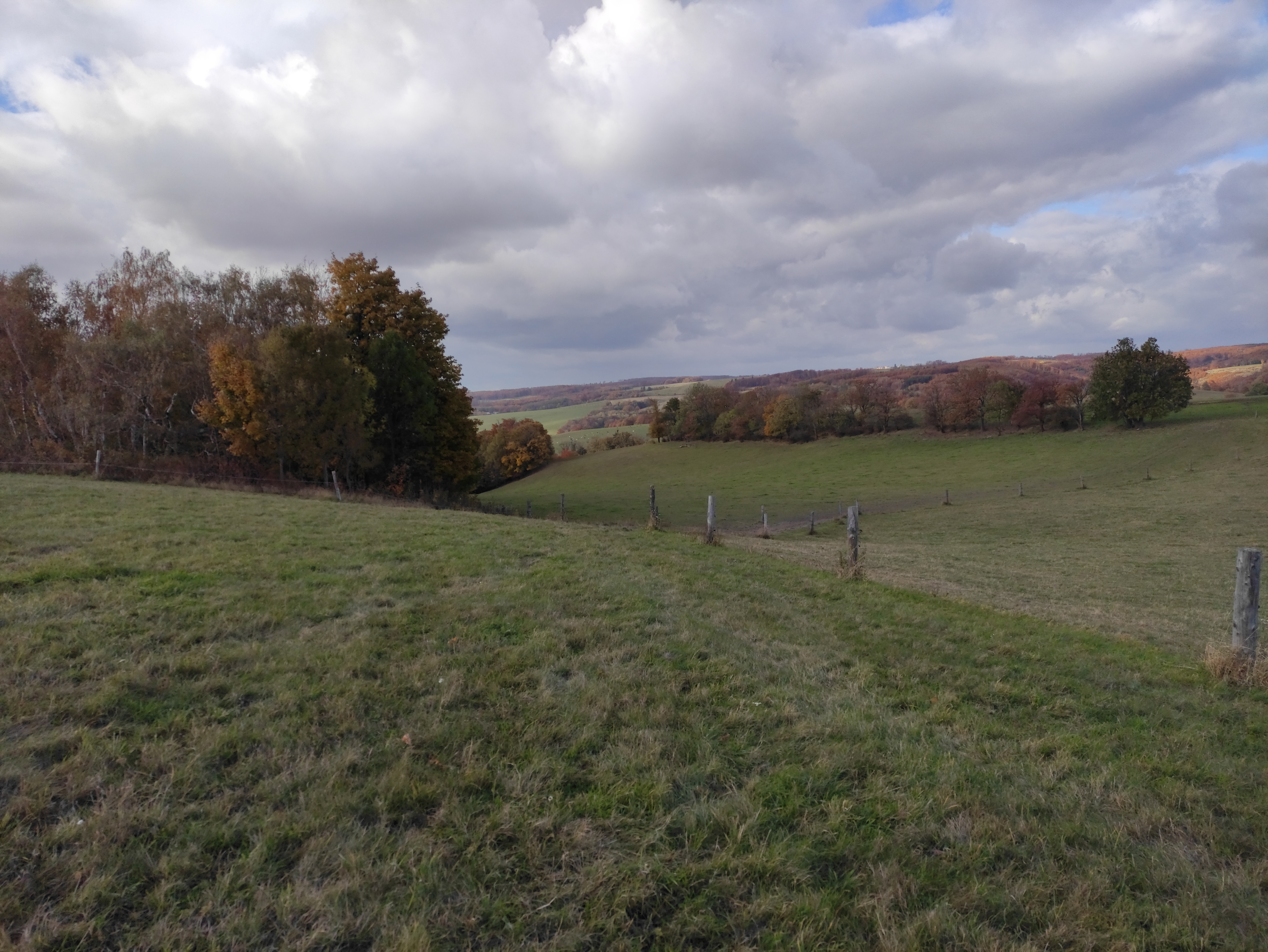
View from Slavkovský vrch

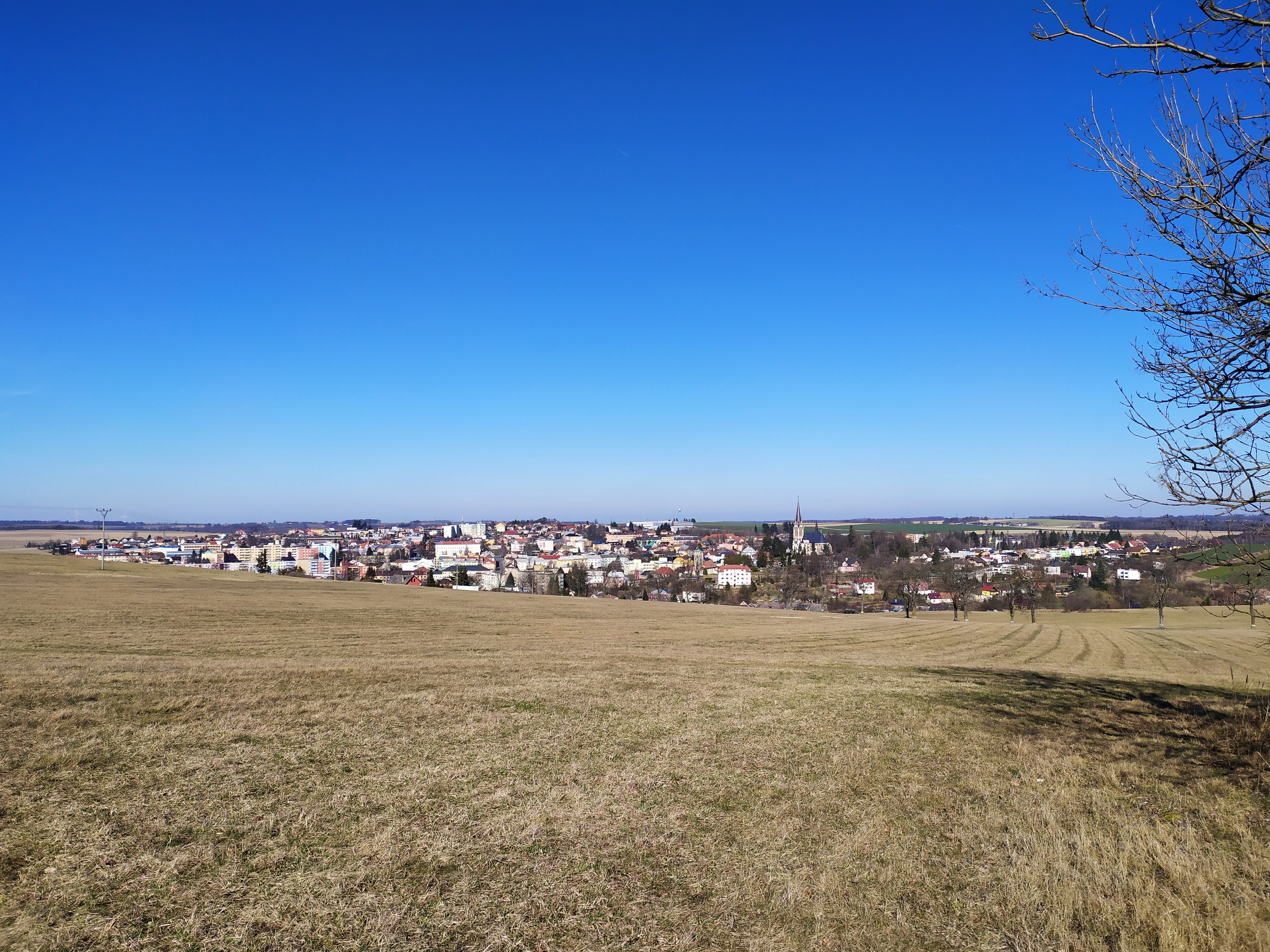
View of Vítkov from Letní kopec
