= Bečva =

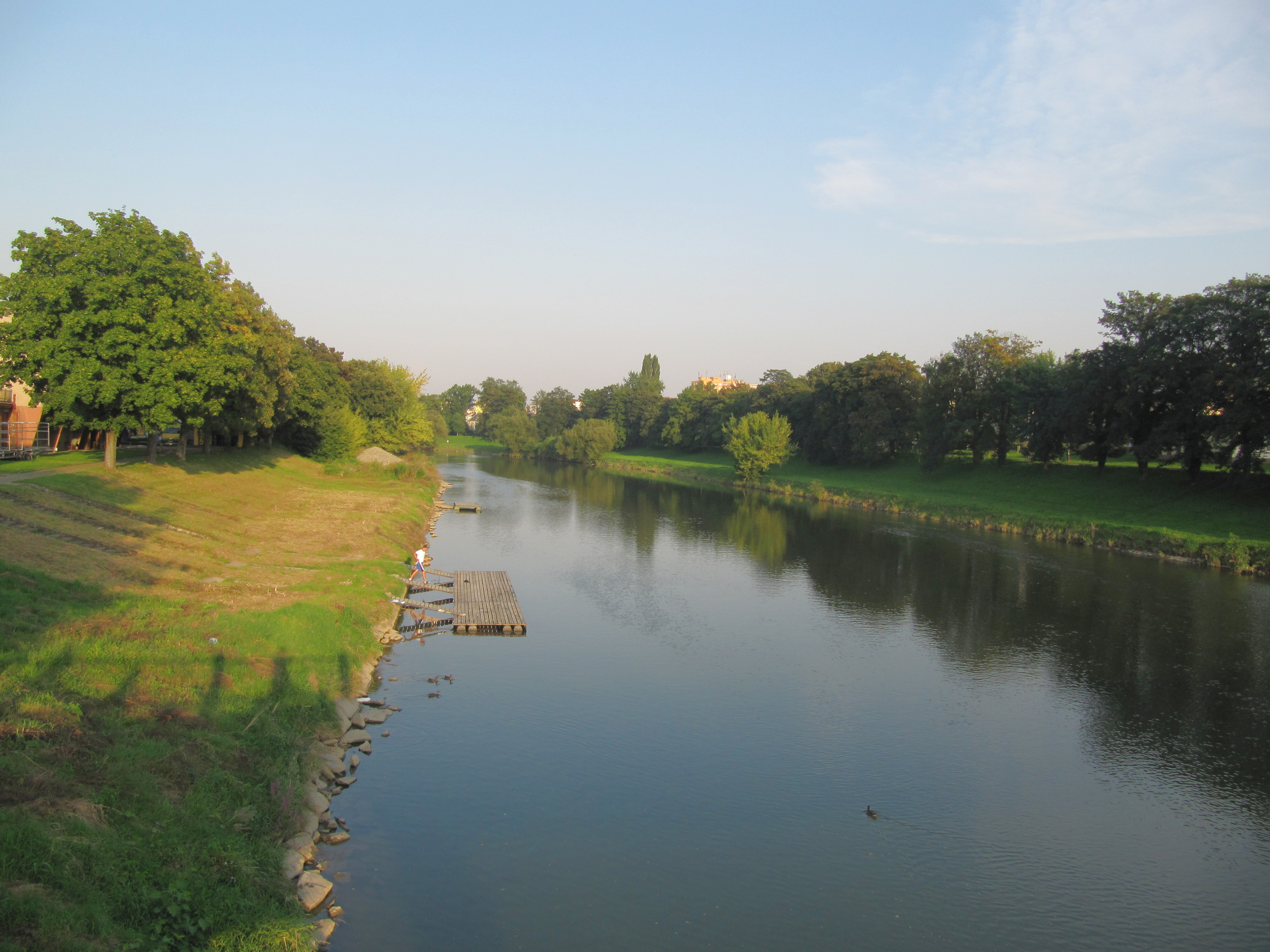
- The Bečva in Přerov

Location
- Country: Czech Republic
- Regions: Olomouc; Zlín

Physical characteristics
- Source: Vsetínská Bečva
  - location: Velké Karlovice, Hostýn-Vsetín Mountains
  - coordinates: 49°23′45″N 18°24′10″E
  - elevation: 896 m (2,940 ft)
- Mouth
  - location: Morava
  - coordinates: 49°25′6″N 17°19′16″E
  - elevation: 195 m (640 ft)
- Length: 121.0 km (75.2 mi)
- Basin size: 1,613.3 km^{2} (622.9 sq mi)
- Discharge
  - average: 17.5 m^{3}/s (620 cu ft/s) near estuary

Basin features
- Progression: Morava→ Danube→ Black Sea

The Bečva (Czech pronunciation: [ˈbɛtʃva]; German: Betschwa, Betsch) is a river in the Czech Republic, a left tributary of the Morava River. It flows through the Olomouc and Zlín regions. It is formed by the confluence of the Vsetínská Bečva and Rožnovská Bečva rivers. Together with the Vsetínská Bečva, which is its main source, the Bečva is 121.0 km (75.2 mi) long, making it the 16th longest river in the Czech Republic. Without the Vsetínská Bečva, it is 61.6 km (38.3 mi) long.

== Etymology ==
The name is derived from the old Czech words bek, beč (i.e. 'cry'), meaning 'loud river'.

== Characteristic ==
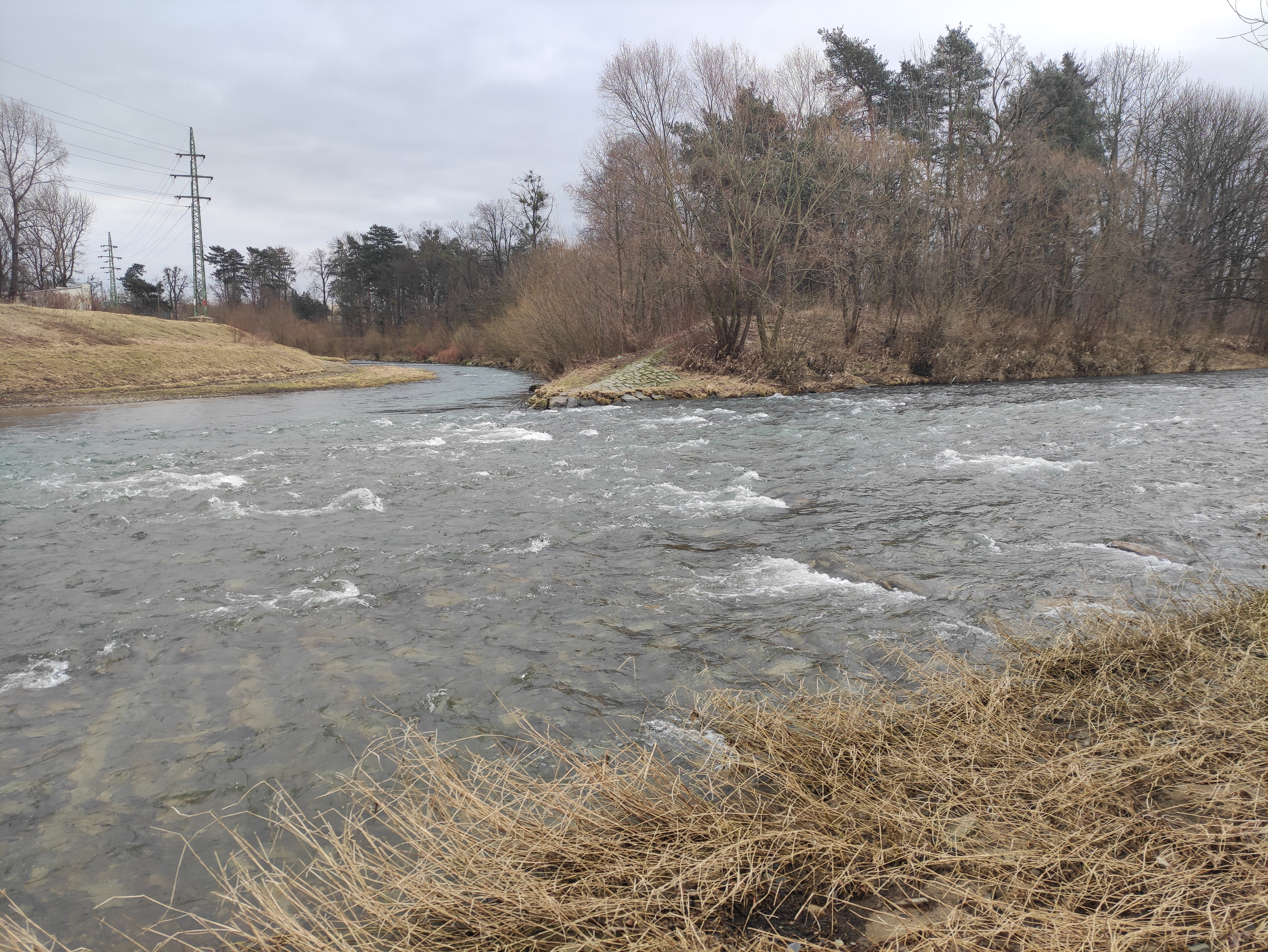
Confluence of the Vsetínská Bečva and Rožnovská Bečva

From a water management point of view, the Bečva and Vsetínská Bečva are two different rivers with separate numbering of river kilometres. In a broader point of view, the Bečva (as Vsetínská Bečva) originates in the territory of Velké Karlovice in the Hostýn-Vsetín Mountains at an elevation of 896 m (2,940 ft) and flows to Tovačov, where it enters the Morava River at an elevation of 195 m (640 ft). It is 121.0 km (75.2 mi) long, making it the 16th longest river in the country. Its drainage basin has an area of 8,854.2 km^{2} (3,418.6 sq mi). The name Bečva is used from the confluence of the Vsetínská Bečva with the Rožnovská Bečva in Valašské Meziříčí and from this point to the confluence with the Morava, the river is 61.6 km (38.3 mi) long.

The sources and longest tributaries of the Bečva are:

Tributary	Length (km)	River km	Side
Vsetínská Bečva	59.4	61.6	–
Rožnovská Bečva	38.0	61.6	right
Juhyně	33.9	54.6	left
Velička	17.9	39.1	right
Loučka	16.1	60.8	left
Ludina	15.7	39.1	right
Jezernice	13.3	31.1	right

== Course ==
The most notable settlement on the river is the city of Přerov. The river flows through the municipal territories of Valašské Meziříčí, Lešná, Choryně, Kladeruby, Hustopeče nad Bečvou, Kelč, Milotice nad Bečvou, Zámrsky, Špičky, Černotín, Skalička, Ústí, Teplice nad Bečvou, Hranice, Jezernice, Týn nad Bečvou, Lipník nad Bečvou, Osek nad Bečvou, Radslavice, Prosenice, Grymov, Přerov, Rokytnice, Troubky and Tovačov.

== Bodies of water ==
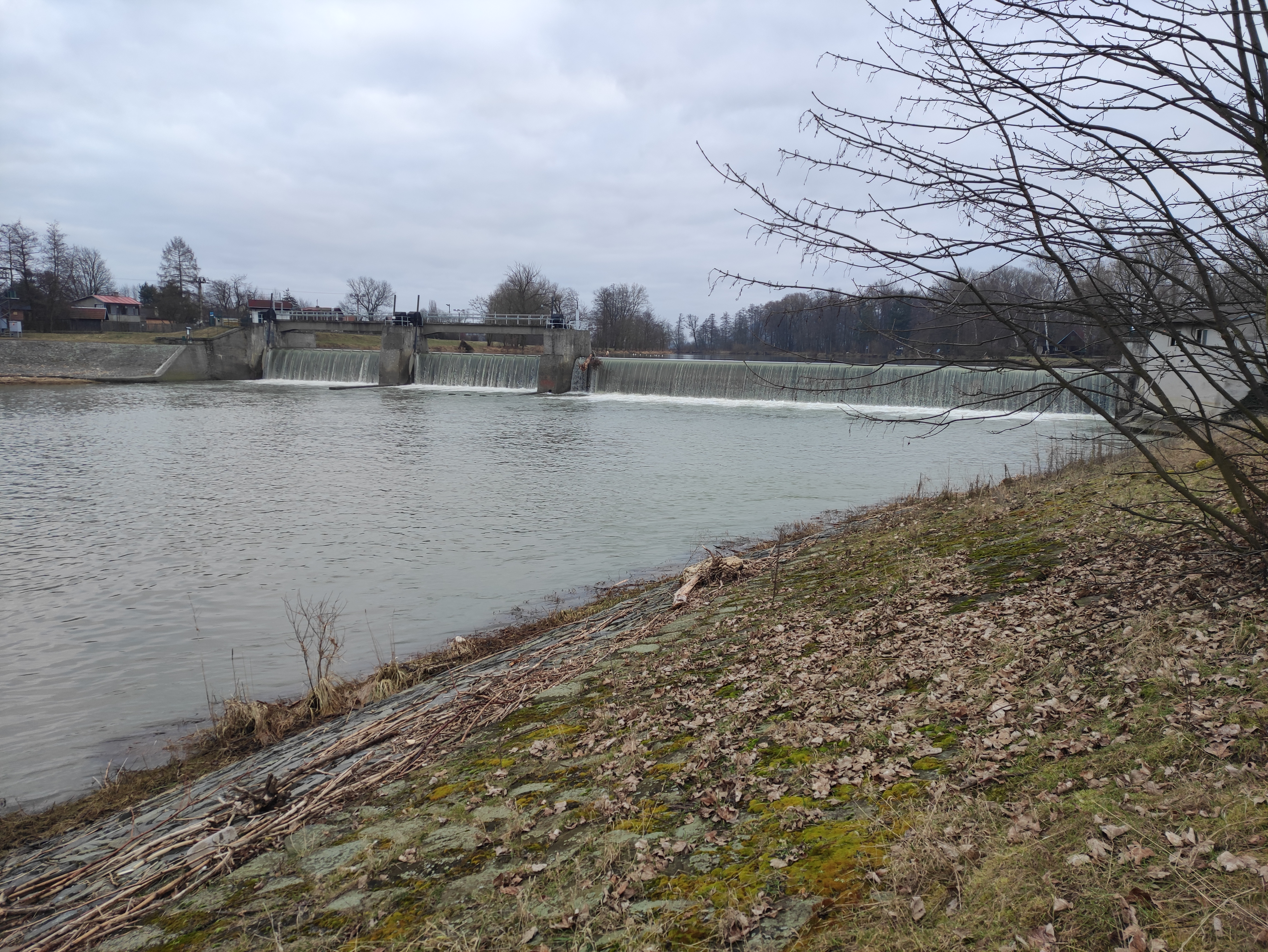
Weir in Lipník nad Bečvou

There are no reservoirs and fishponds built directly on the Bečva. There are 655 bodies of water in the basin area. The largest of them are the Karolinka Reservoir with an area of 44 ha (110 acres) and the fishpond Velký choryňský with an area of 36 ha (89 acres).

== Floods ==
The area around Bečva is prone to flooding and was severely damaged during the 1997 Central European flood. The construction of the Skalička dry pond is planned for the river. It will serve to regulate the flow during floods. Construction is planned for 2025–2029.

== Fauna ==
Among the fish species found in the river are barbel, nase, European chub, trout, pike, sander and perch. The number of fish decreased significantly after the ecological disaster of 20 September 2020, when chemicals entered the river in an unknown way. About 40 tonnes of dead fish were caught, but actual losses may have been much higher.

The absence of dams had a positive effect on the high biodiversity around the river. There are dozens of endangered species of beetles (including six critically endangered species of beetles) and three endangered species of spiders. Protected birds bound to the river include the common kingfisher and the little ringed plover.

== Tourism ==
The Bečva is suitable for river tourism and belongs to the rivers suitable for less experienced paddlers. The river is navigable especially in spring and after the rains. Shoals form when the water level is lower.
