= Ústí (disambiguation) =

Ústí may refer to places in the Czech Republic:

- Ústí (Jihlava District), a municipality and village in the Vysočina Region
- Ústí (Přerov District), a municipality and village in the Olomouc Region
- Ústí (Vsetín District), a municipality and village in the Zlín Region
- Ústí, a hamlet and part of Kočov in the Plzeň Region
- Ústí, a village and part of Stará Paka in the Hradec Králové Region
- Ústí nad Labem, a city
  - Ústí nad Labem District, a district surrounding the city
  - Ústí nad Labem Region, a region in the north-western part of the country
- Ústí nad Orlicí, a town in the Pardubice Region
  - Ústí nad Orlicí District, a district surrounding the town
- Sezimovo Ústí, a town in the South Bohemian Region
