= Radslavice =

Radslavice may refer to places in the Czech Republic:

- Radslavice (Přerov District), a municipality and village in the Olomouc Region
- Radslavice (Vyškov District), a municipality and village in the South Moravian Region
- Radslavice, a village and part of Neveklov in the Central Bohemian Region
- Horní Radslavice, a municipality and village in the Vysočina Region
