= Hefaiston =

International blacksmithing competition

Coordinates: 49°31′5.24″N 17°37′42.87″E

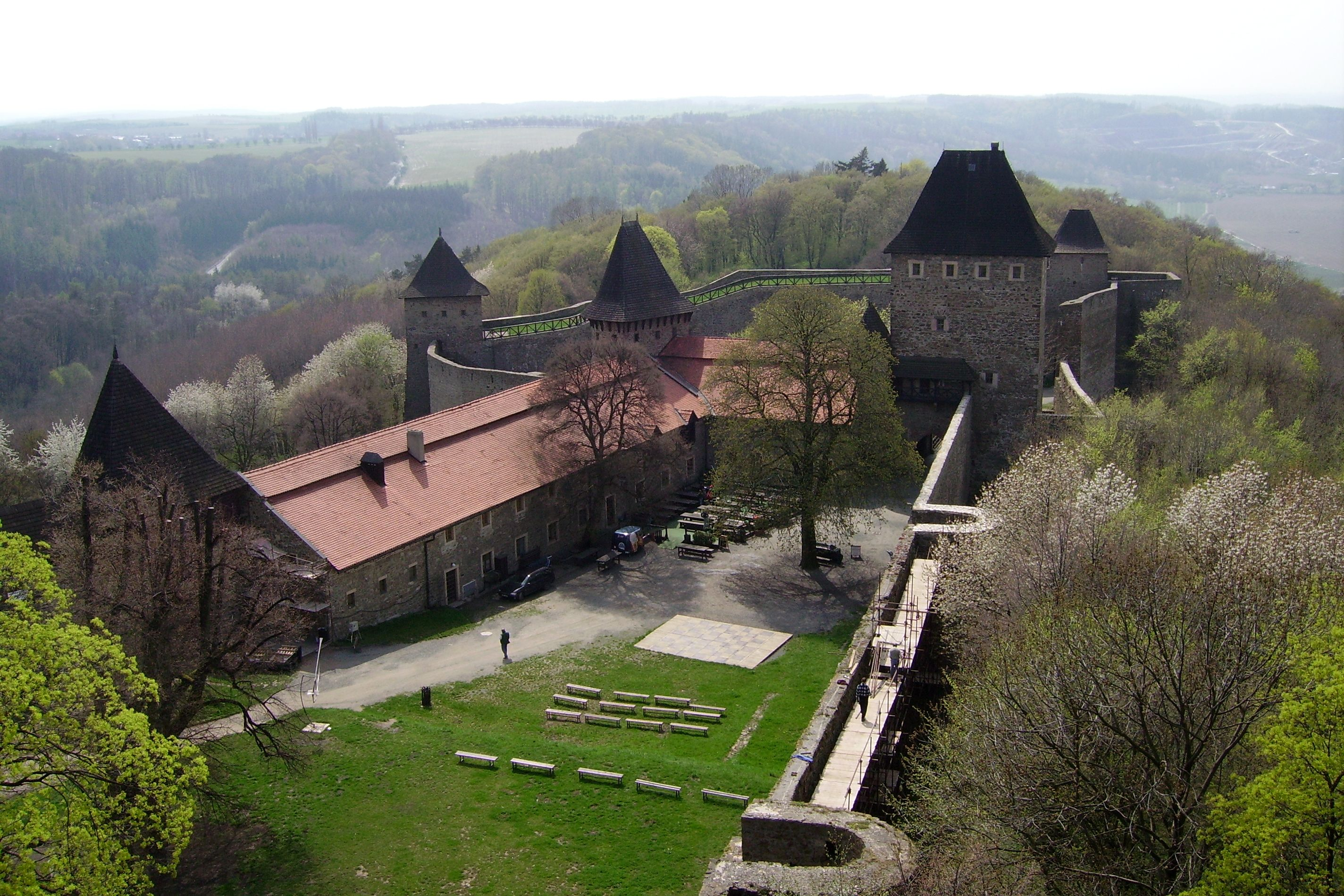
A part of the Helfštýn castle, Czech Republic.

The Hefaiston is an annual gathering and international competition of blacksmiths that is held at the Helfštýn castle, Czech Republic. It is named after the Greek god Hephaestus. The event is organized by the Comenius Museum in Přerov in collaboration with the administration of the castle since 1982. The 29th gathering (held in 2010) was attended by more than four hundred blacksmiths. The Hefaiston is considered one of the most important annual meetings of artist blacksmiths in the world.

== History ==
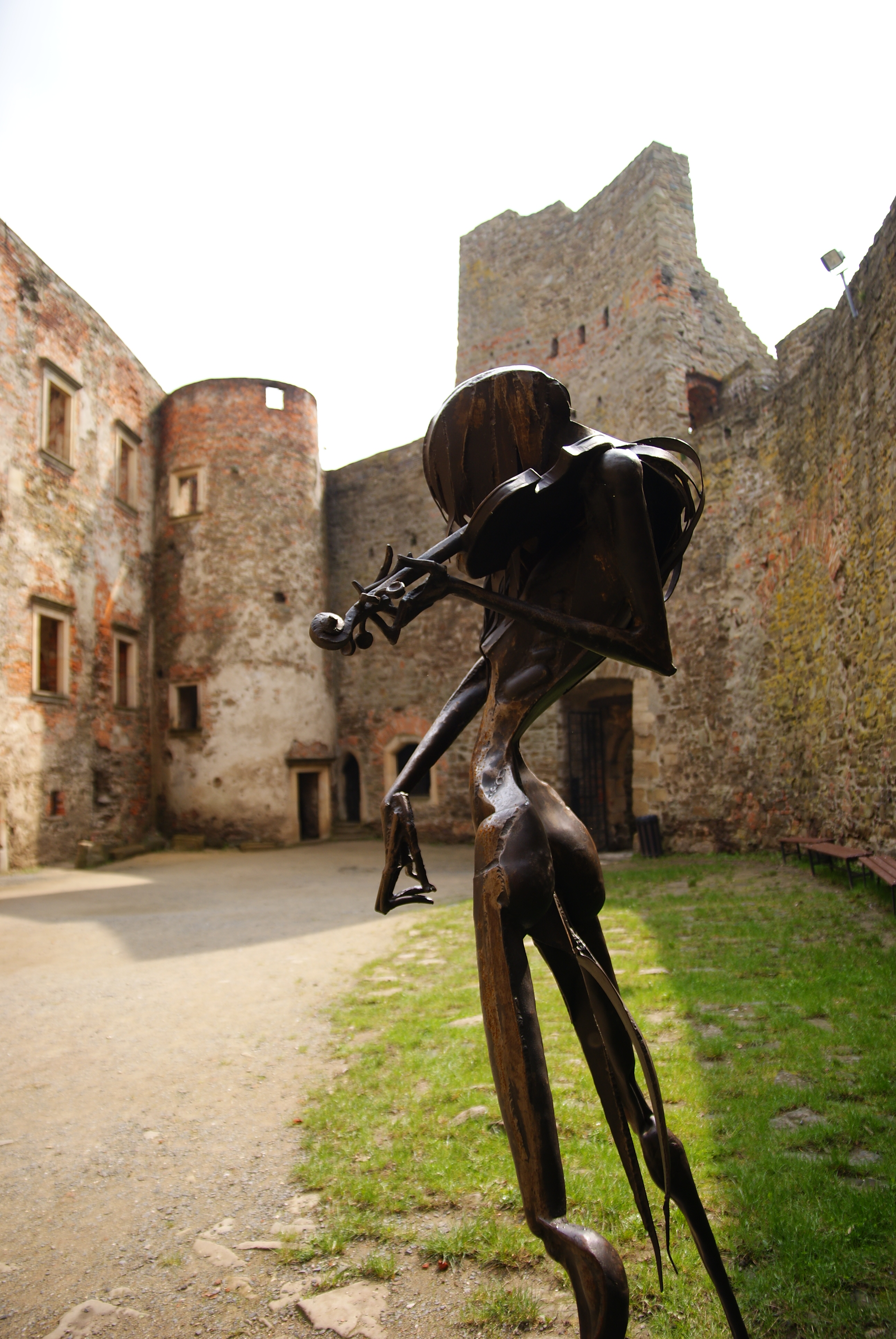
Ironwork at Helfštýn castle.

The tradition of annual blacksmith gatherings at Helfštýn started in 1982. Initially, the event involved only blacksmiths from the former Czechoslovakia. Thanks to the efforts of the master blacksmith Alfred Habermann, who spread the information about the event not only in Czechoslovakia but also abroad, the gatherings gradually turned into a meeting place for blacksmiths from all over the world. The Hefaiston is visited by artist blacksmiths from the Central and Western Europe, but also from Japan, Argentina, Canada, Israel, Uzbekistan etc.

== Structure and organization ==
The main principle of the Hefaiston remains unchanged for years. It starts one week before the main competition with the workshop called The Blacksmith Forum. During the forum, one or groups of blacksmiths working in the castle realize their ideas and designs. Their iron works are subsequently displayed at the castle, and during the weekend are confronted with the works of their blacksmith competitors.

Each gathering is connected with the competition. The expert jury evaluates the works of blacksmiths in two categories, works imported to Helfštýn and works created directly at the castle. The jury evaluates the exhibits in the following categories:

- Classical artistic blacksmithing
- Sculptural works and chamber sculpture
- Jewelry
- Weapons
- Damascene metal work
- Iron founding work

Since 2008, the best blacksmiths receive the Alfred Habermann Award. A part of the exhibited works remains in the possession of the castle, and Helfštýn represent one of the world's greatest collections of artistic metalworks.

== See also ==
- Mateřinka
- Serial Killer (festival)
- Gorolski Święto
