= Osek nad Bečvou =

- Municipality
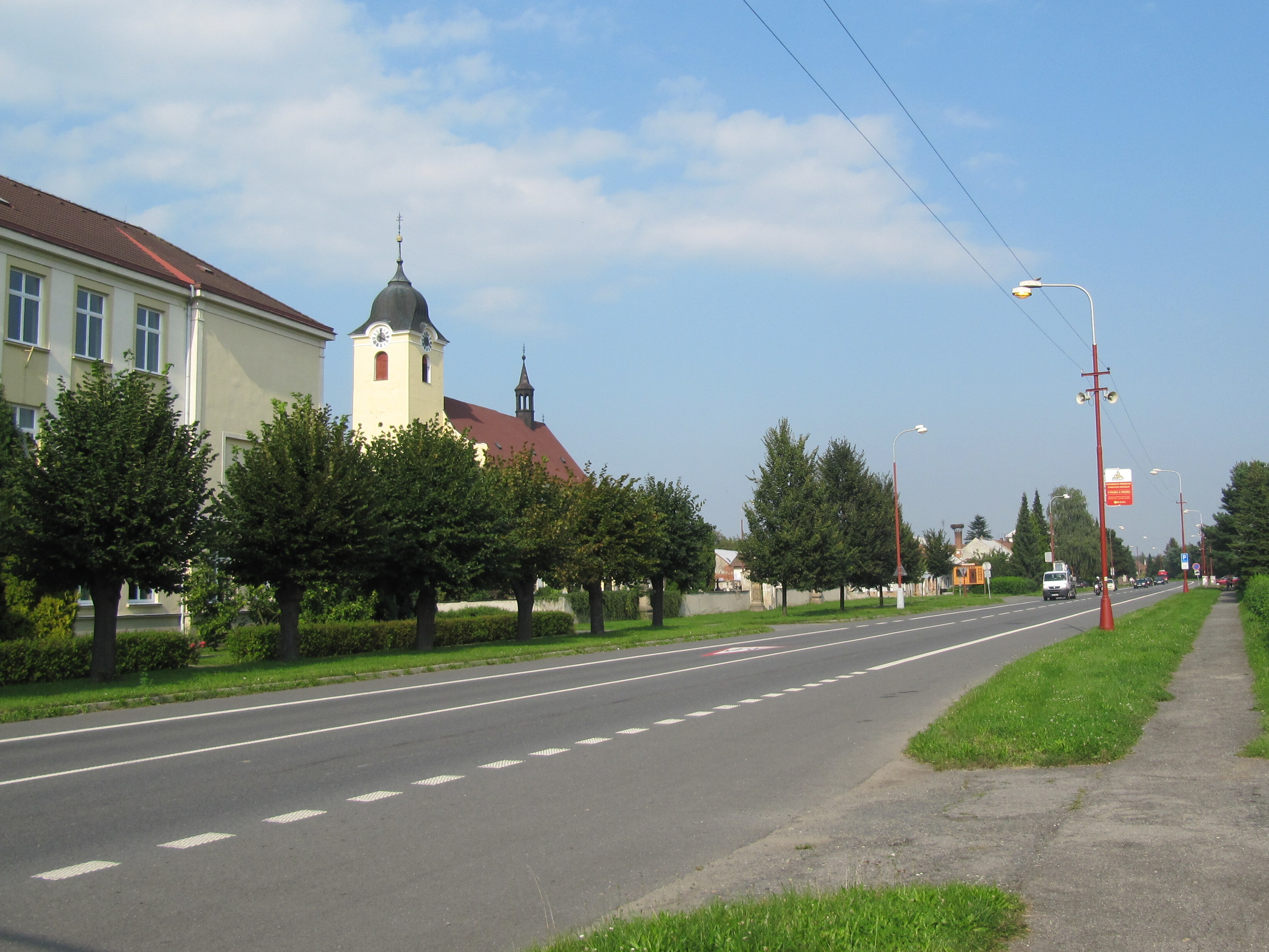
- Main street and the Church of the Exaltation of the Holy Cross

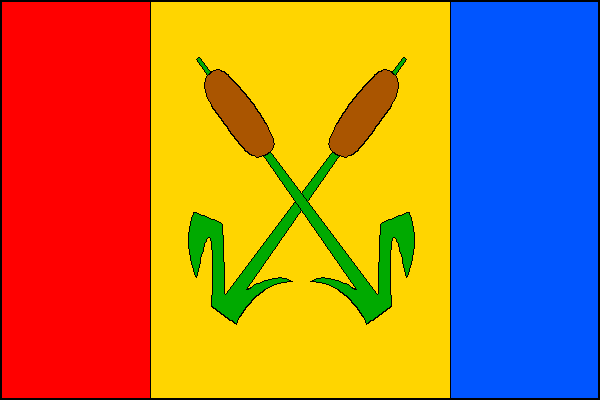
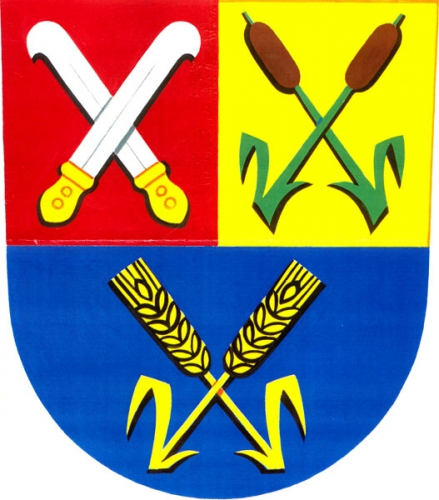
- Flag Coat of arms

- Location in the Czech Republic
- Coordinates: 49°30′40″N 17°31′42″E
- Country: Czech Republic
- Region: Olomouc
- District: Přerov
- First mentioned: 1374

Area
  - Total: 13.03 km^{2} (5.03 sq mi)
- Elevation: 225 m (738 ft)

Population (2026-01-01)
  - Total: 1,365
  - Density: 104.8/km^{2} (271.3/sq mi)
- Time zone: UTC+1 (CET)
  - Summer (DST): UTC+2 (CEST)
- Postal code: 751 22
- Website: www.oseknadbecvou.cz

Osek nad Bečvou is a municipality and village in Přerov District in the Olomouc Region of the Czech Republic. It has about 1,400 inhabitants.

Osek nad Bečvou lies approximately 9 kilometres (6 mi) north-east of Přerov, 22 km (14 mi) south-east of Olomouc, and 232 km (144 mi) east of Prague. It lies on the Bečva River.

== Demographics ==
Historical population
Year	Pop.	±%
1869	894	—
1880	1,061	+18.7%
1890	1,180	+11.2%
1900	1,235	+4.7%
1910	1,269	+2.8%
1921	1,254	−1.2%
1930	1,370	+9.3%
1950	1,211	−11.6%
1961	1,255	+3.6%
1970	1,158	−7.7%
1980	1,067	−7.9%
1991	1,041	−2.4%
2001	1,074	+3.2%
2011	1,175	+9.4%
2021	1,250	+6.4%
Source: Censuses
