= Ústí (Přerov District) =

- Municipality
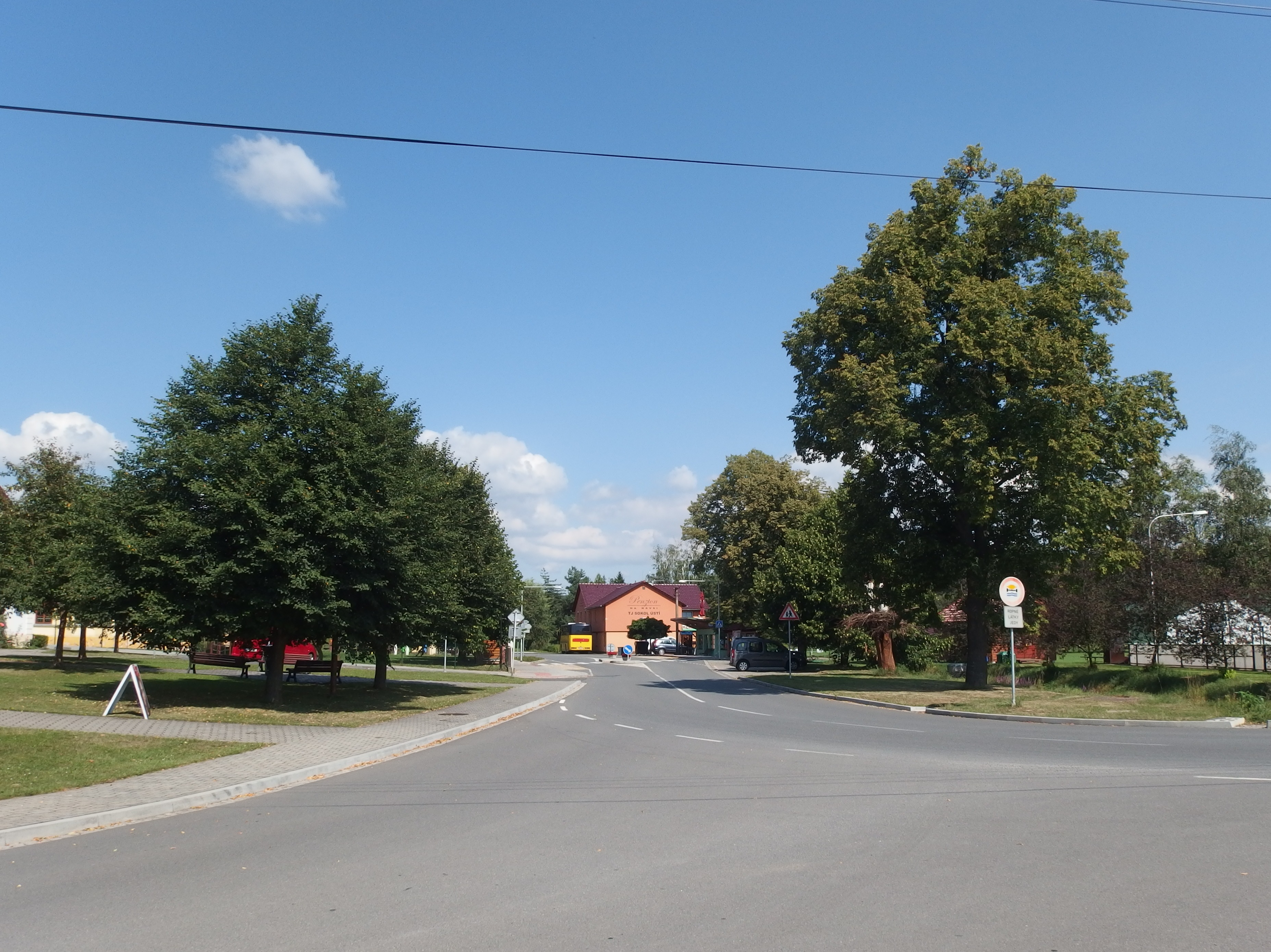
- Centre of Ústí

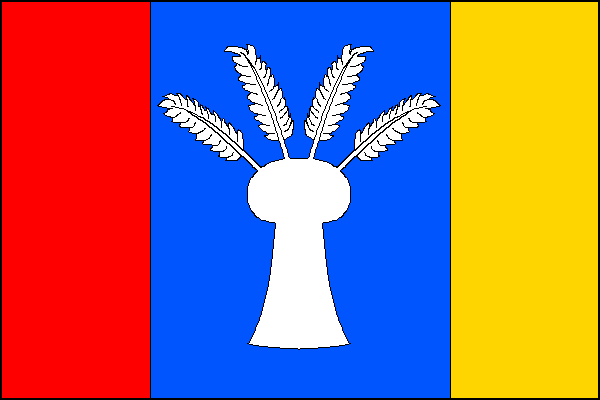
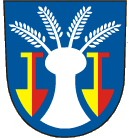
- Flag Coat of arms

- Location in the Czech Republic
- Coordinates: 49°31′0″N 17°45′59″E
- Country: Czech Republic
- Region: Olomouc
- District: Přerov
- First mentioned: 1389

Area
  - Total: 3.31 km^{2} (1.28 sq mi)
- Elevation: 257 m (843 ft)

Population (2026-01-01)
  - Total: 530
  - Density: 160/km^{2} (410/sq mi)
- Time zone: UTC+1 (CET)
  - Summer (DST): UTC+2 (CEST)
- Postal code: 753 01
- Website: www.obec-usti.cz

Ústí is a municipality and village in Přerov District in the Olomouc Region of the Czech Republic. It has about 500 inhabitants.

== Geography ==
Ústí is located about 23 kilometres (14 mi) northeast of Přerov and 36 km (22 mi) east of Olomouc. It lies in the Moravian-Silesian Foothills. The highest point is at 317 m (1,040 ft). The municipality is situated on the left bank of the Bečva River.

== History ==
The first written mention of Ústí is from 1389, when it was owned by a lesser nobleman Hrabiš of Podolí. From the early 15th century, the village belonged to the Helfštýn estate. In 1475, the estate was bought by the Pernštejn family and merged with their estates of Přerov, Hranice and Drahotuše. Between 1547 and 1621, the estate with Ústí changed hands several times. After 1621, the estate was acquired by the Dietrichstein family and they owned Ústí until the establishment of an independent municipality in 1848.

== Demographics ==
Historical population

Year	Pop.	±%
1869	426	—
1880	425	−0.2%
1890	434	+2.1%
1900	442	+1.8%
1910	430	−2.7%

Year	Pop.	±%
1921	464	+7.9%
1930	508	+9.5%
1950	491	−3.3%
1961	539	+9.8%
1970	535	−0.7%

Year	Pop.	±%
1980	554	+3.6%
1991	526	−5.1%
2001	560	+6.5%
2011	526	−6.1%
2021	526	+0.0%

Source: Censuses

== Transport ==
There are no railways or major roads passing through the municipality.

== Sights ==
The only protected cultural monument in the municipality is the locality where the gord of Hradištěk stood. Only the landscaping and ramparts have survived from the gord. Today it is an archaeological site.

The main landmark of Ústí is the Church of Saints Peter and Paul. It dates from 1947.
