= Jezernice, Czech Republic =

Jezernice
- Municipality
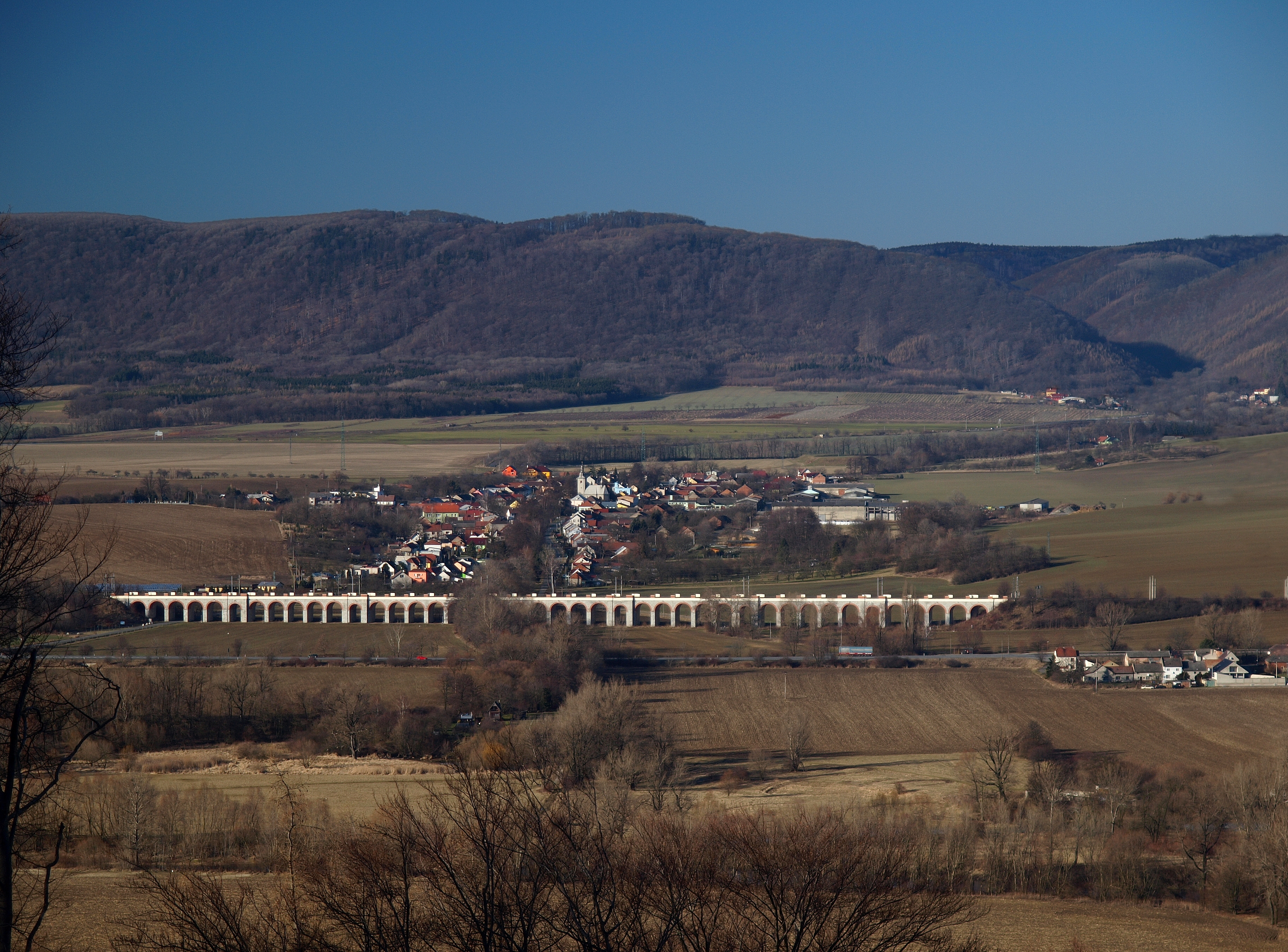
- General view

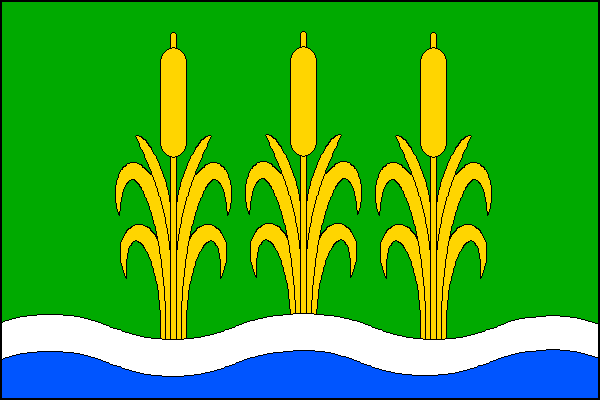
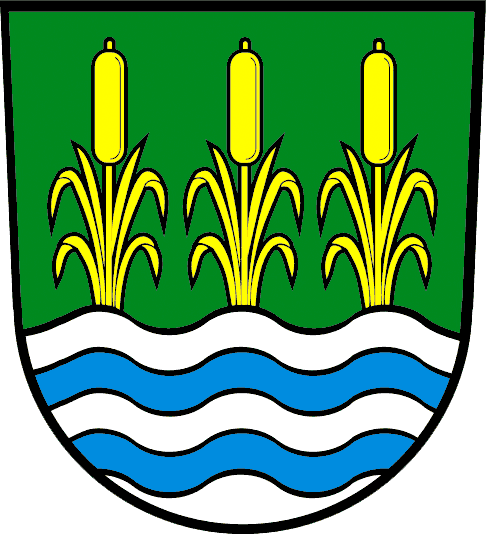
- Flag Coat of arms

- Location in the Czech Republic
- Coordinates: 49°32′52″N 17°37′30″E
- Country: Czech Republic
- Region: Olomouc
- District: Přerov
- First mentioned: 1353

Area
  - Total: 9.28 km^{2} (3.58 sq mi)
- Elevation: 259 m (850 ft)

Population (2026-01-01)
  - Total: 662
  - Density: 71.3/km^{2} (185/sq mi)
- Time zone: UTC+1 (CET)
  - Summer (DST): UTC+2 (CEST)
- Postal code: 751 35
- Website: www.jezernice.cz

Jezernice is a municipality and village in Přerov District in the Olomouc Region of the Czech Republic. It has about 700 inhabitants.

== Geography ==
Jezernice is located about 16 kilometres (10 mi) northeast of Přerov and 25 km (16 mi) east of Olomouc. It lies in the Moravian Gate depression. The Bečva River flows through the southern part of the municipality.

== History ==
The first written mention of Jezernice is from 1353, when it was part of the Drahotuše estate. Among the most notable owners of the village were the Pernštejn family and Cardinal Franz von Dietrichstein.

== Demographics ==
Historical population

Year	Pop.	±%
1869	816	—
1880	904	+10.8%
1890	896	−0.9%
1900	929	+3.7%
1910	1,031	+11.0%

Year	Pop.	±%
1921	941	−8.7%
1930	853	−9.4%
1950	748	−12.3%
1961	775	+3.6%
1970	712	−8.1%

Year	Pop.	±%
1980	713	+0.1%
1991	670	−6.0%
2001	674	+0.6%
2011	642	−4.7%
2021	651	+1.4%

Source: Censuses

== Transport ==
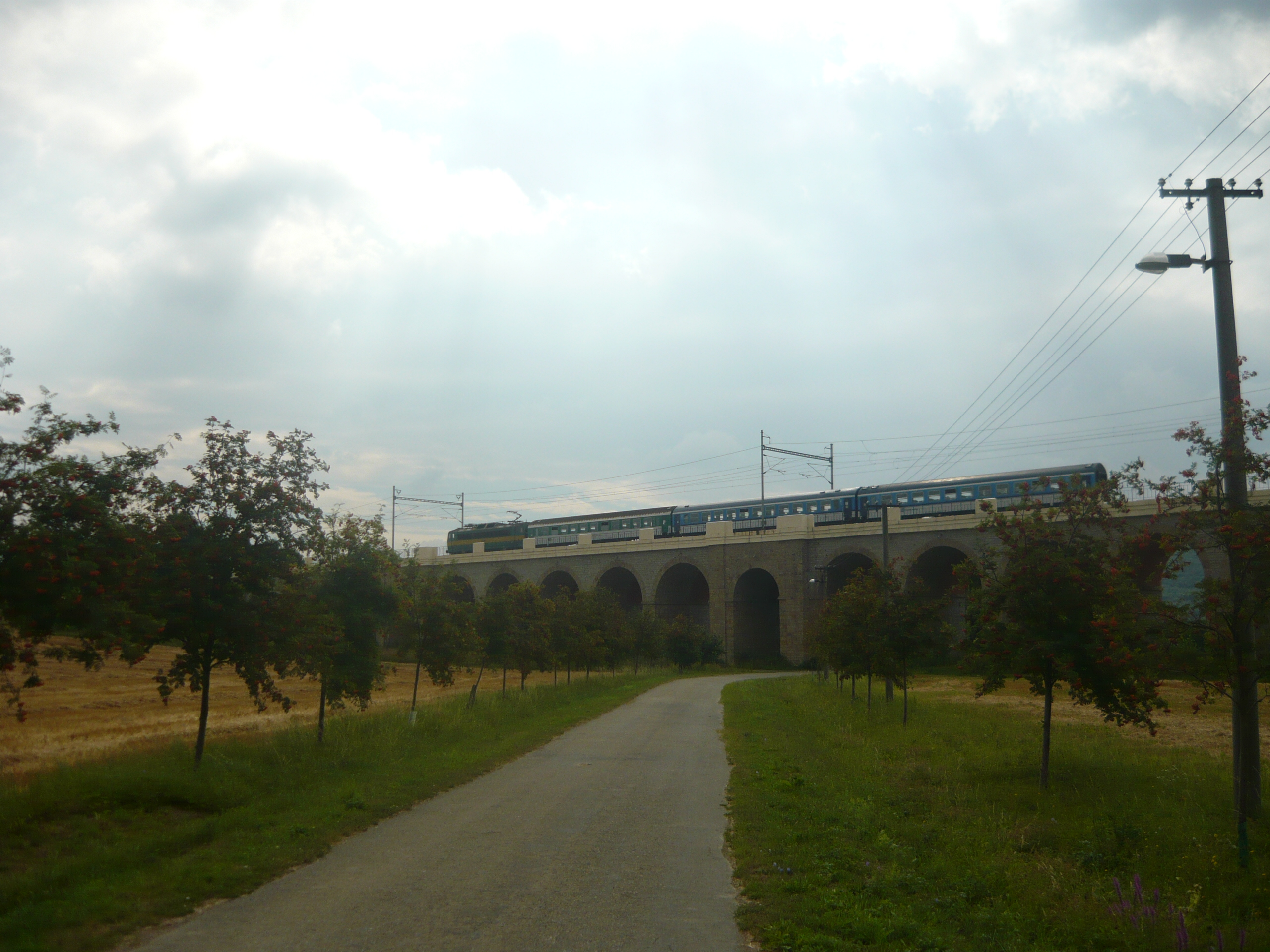
Railway viaduct

The D1 motorway (part of European route E462) from Brno to Ostrava runs north of Jezernice. The I/47 road (part of European route E442) from Přerov to Odry runs through the southern part of the municipality.

The major railway lines Prague–Púchov and Brno–Bohumín run through the municipality, but there is no train station. The municipality is served by the station in neighbouring Lipník nad Bečvou.

== Sights ==
Jezernice is known for a pair of adjacent railway viaducts, protected as a cultural monument. The southern brick viaduct was built for Emperor Ferdinand Northern Railway in 1842 and the northern stone viaduct was added in 1873 to make the track double-track. They are 426 metres (1,398 ft) and 415 m (1,362 ft) long and are made up of 42 arches.

A notable landmark is the Church of Saint Martin, which dates from the 15th century.
