= Troubky =

- Municipality
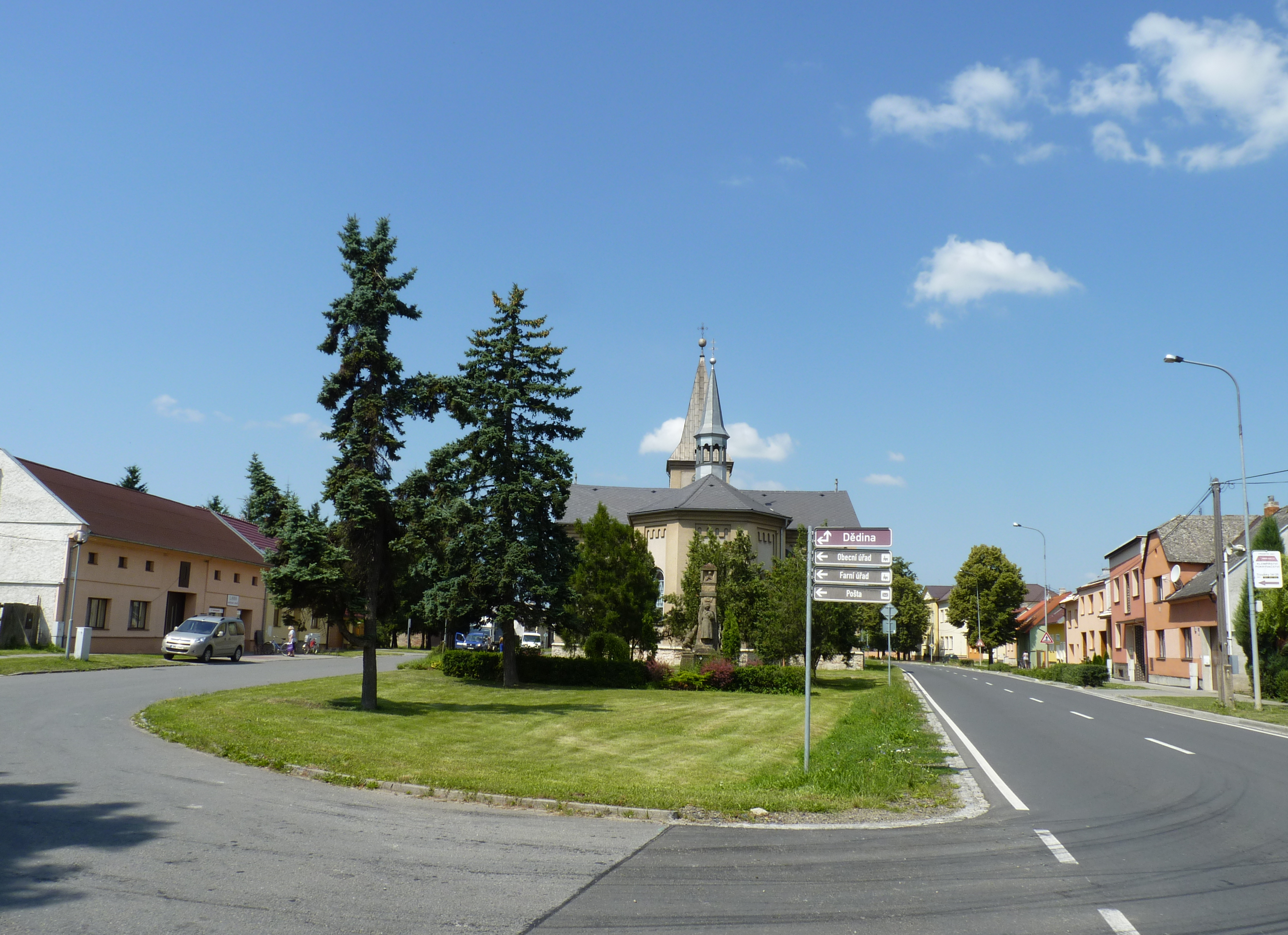
- Centre of Troubky

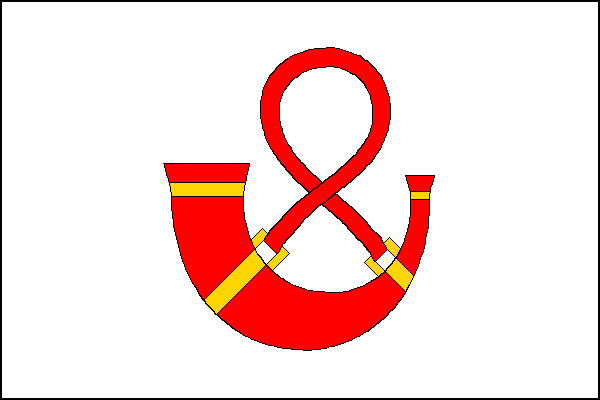
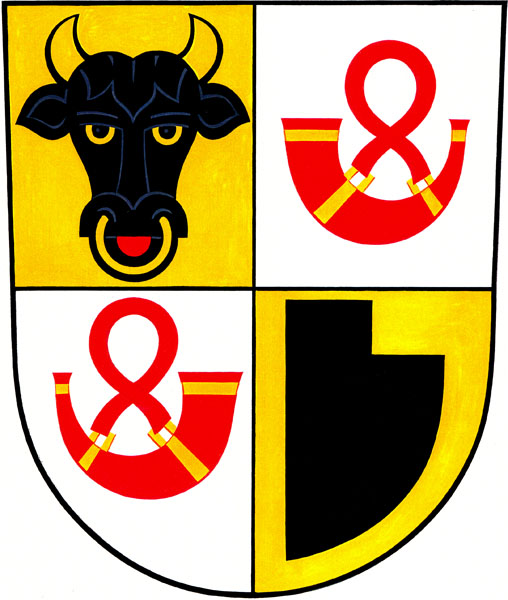
- Flag Coat of arms

- Location in the Czech Republic
- Coordinates: 49°25′56″N 17°20′57″E
- Country: Czech Republic
- Region: Olomouc
- District: Přerov
- First mentioned: 1348

Area
  - Total: 21.13 km^{2} (8.16 sq mi)
- Elevation: 199 m (653 ft)

Population (2026-01-01)
  - Total: 1,996
  - Density: 94.46/km^{2} (244.7/sq mi)
- Time zone: UTC+1 (CET)
  - Summer (DST): UTC+2 (CEST)
- Postal code: 751 02
- Website: www.troubky.cz

Troubky is a municipality and village in Přerov District in the Olomouc Region of the Czech Republic. It has about 2,000 inhabitants.

== Geography ==
Troubky is located about 7 kilometres (4 mi) west of Přerov and 18 km (11 mi) south of Olomouc. It lies in the Upper Morava Valley. It is situated at the left bank of the Bečva River, near its confluence with the Morava.

== History ==
The first written mention about Troubky is from 1348. Until 1380, Troubky was a separate estate with a fortress. From 1380 until 1848, the village was part of the Tovačov estate and shared its owners. Among the most important owners of the estate were the Tovačovský of Cimburk family and the Pernštejn family.

The municipality was severely affected by 1997 Central European flood, in which nine people died and 150 houses were destroyed. Thirteen years later, in 2010, Troubky was flooded again.

== Demographics ==
Historical population

Year	Pop.	±%
1869	1,293	—
1880	1,552	+20.0%
1890	1,792	+15.5%
1900	1,913	+6.8%
1910	2,084	+8.9%

Year	Pop.	±%
1921	2,144	+2.9%
1930	2,201	+2.7%
1950	2,029	−7.8%
1961	2,358	+16.2%
1970	2,209	−6.3%

Year	Pop.	±%
1980	2,183	−1.2%
1991	2,070	−5.2%
2001	1,988	−4.0%
2011	2,066	+3.9%
2021	1,935	−6.3%

Source: Censuses

== Transport ==
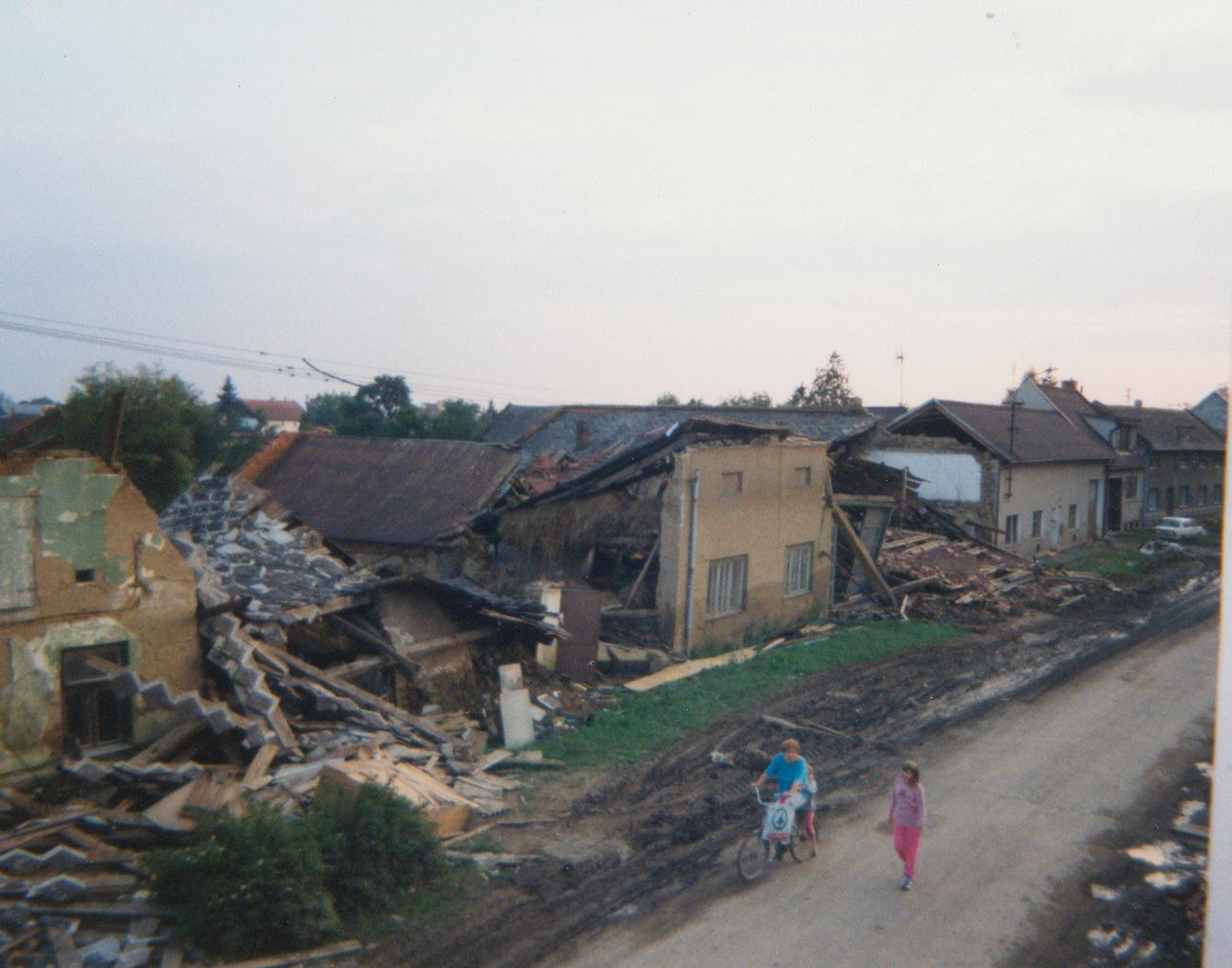
Troubky after 1997 flooding

There are no railways or major roads passing through the municipality.

== Sights ==
The main landmark of Troubky is the Church of Saint Margaret. It was built in 1872, when it replaced an old wooden church from the 13th century.
