= Broumov (Tachov District) =

- Municipality
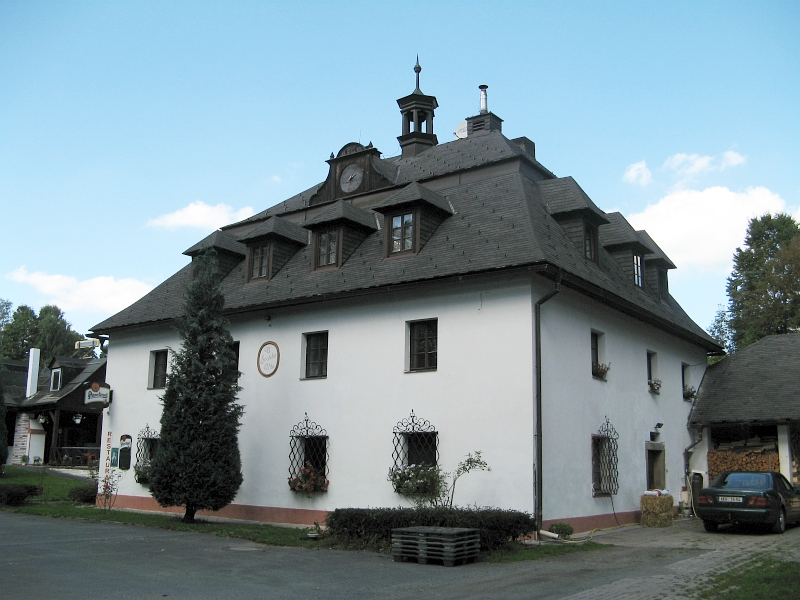
- Saint Vitus Castle

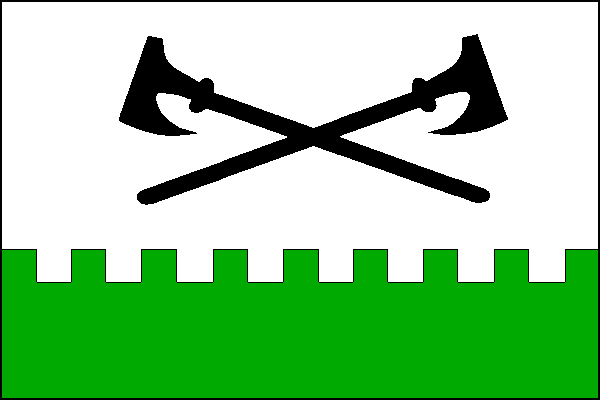
- Flag Coat of arms

- Location in the Czech Republic
- Coordinates: 49°53′22″N 12°36′24″E
- Country: Czech Republic
- Region: Plzeň
- District: Tachov
- First mentioned: 1523

Area
  - Total: 10.17 km^{2} (3.93 sq mi)
- Elevation: 573 m (1,880 ft)

Population (2026-01-01)
  - Total: 137
  - Density: 13.5/km^{2} (34.9/sq mi)
- Time zone: UTC+1 (CET)
  - Summer (DST): UTC+2 (CEST)
- Postal code: 348 15
- Website: www.ou-broumov.cz

Broumov (German: Promenhof) is a municipality and village in Tachov District in the Plzeň Region of the Czech Republic. It has about 100 inhabitants.

Broumov lies approximately 11 kilometres (7 mi) north of Tachov, 60 km (37 mi) west of Plzeň, and 134 km (83 mi) west of Prague.

== Demographics ==
Historical population
Year	Pop.	±%
1869	756	—
1880	756	+0.0%
1890	748	−1.1%
1900	769	+2.8%
1910	743	−3.4%
1921	737	−0.8%
1930	732	−0.7%
1950	185	−74.7%
1961	152	−17.8%
1970	141	−7.2%
1980	125	−11.3%
1991	106	−15.2%
2001	125	+17.9%
2011	117	−6.4%
2021	149	+27.4%
Source: Censuses
