= Ústí (Jihlava District) =

- Municipality
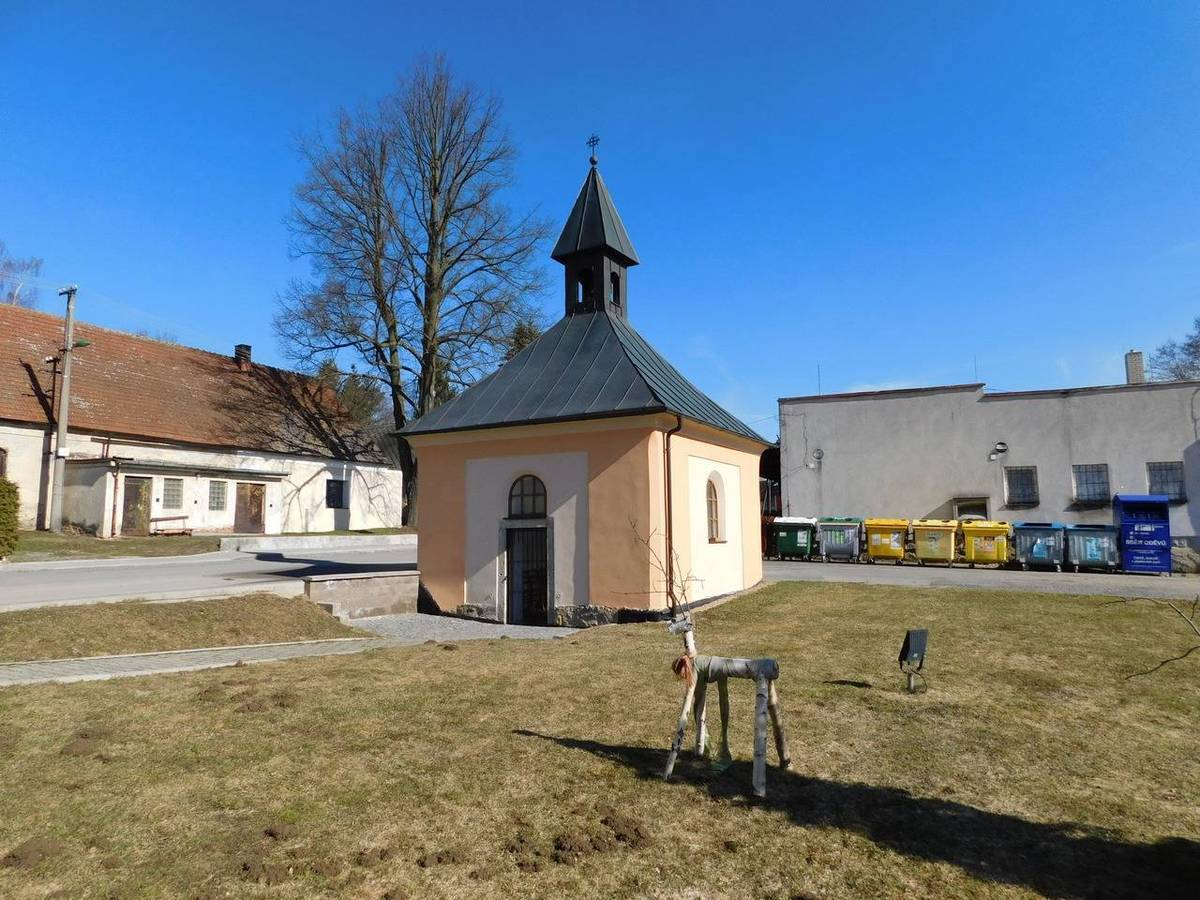
- Chapel in Ústí

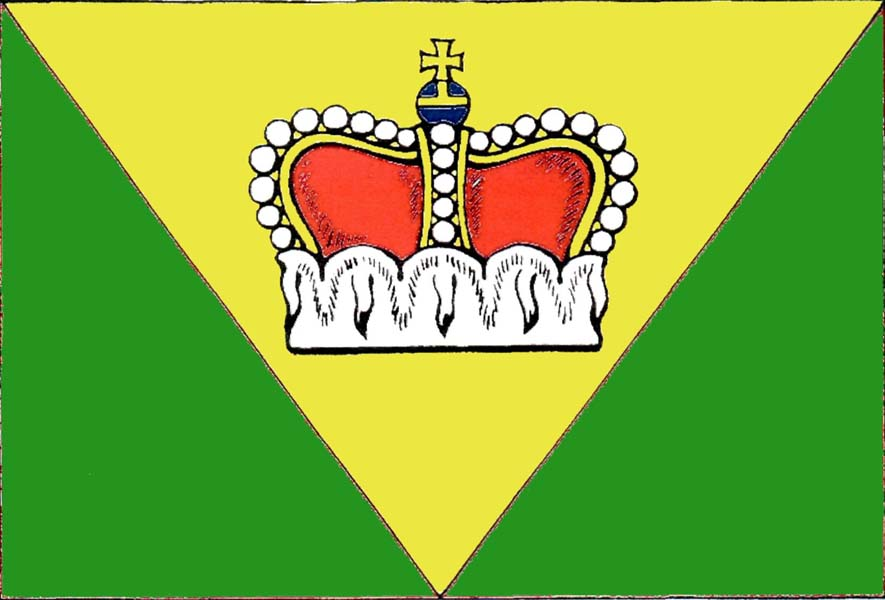
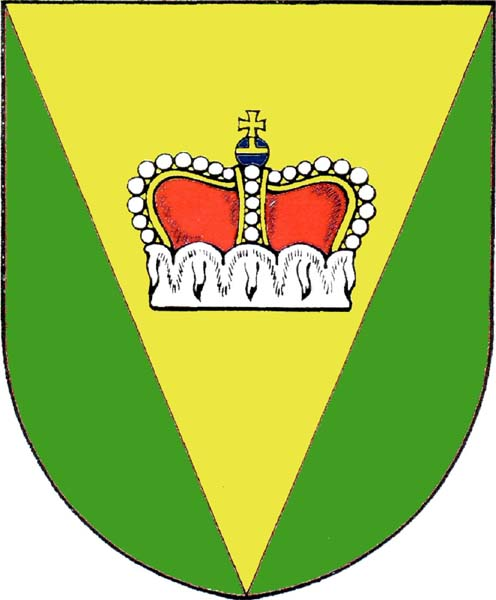
- Flag Coat of arms

- Location in the Czech Republic
- Coordinates: 49°28′25″N 15°24′53″E
- Country: Czech Republic
- Region: Vysočina
- District: Jihlava
- First mentioned: 1257

Area
  - Total: 9.14 km^{2} (3.53 sq mi)
- Elevation: 585 m (1,919 ft)

Population (2026-01-01)
  - Total: 225
  - Density: 24.6/km^{2} (63.8/sq mi)
- Time zone: UTC+1 (CET)
  - Summer (DST): UTC+2 (CEST)
- Postal code: 588 42
- Website: usti.ji.cz

Ústí (Czech pronunciation: [ˈuːsciː]) is a municipality and village in Jihlava District in the Vysočina Region of the Czech Republic. It has about 200 inhabitants.

Ústí lies approximately 16 kilometres (10 mi) north-west of Jihlava and 99 km (62 mi) south-east of Prague.

== Administrative division ==
Ústí consists of two municipal parts (in brackets population according to the 2021 census):

- Ústí (203)
- Branišov (7)

== Demographics ==
Historical population
Year	Pop.	±%
1869	688	—
1880	686	−0.3%
1890	760	+10.8%
1900	685	−9.9%
1910	636	−7.2%
1921	631	−0.8%
1930	571	−9.5%
1950	397	−30.5%
1961	392	−1.3%
1970	300	−23.5%
1980	262	−12.7%
1991	209	−20.2%
2001	195	−6.7%
2011	221	+13.3%
2021	210	−5.0%
Source: Censuses
