= Prosenice =

- Municipality
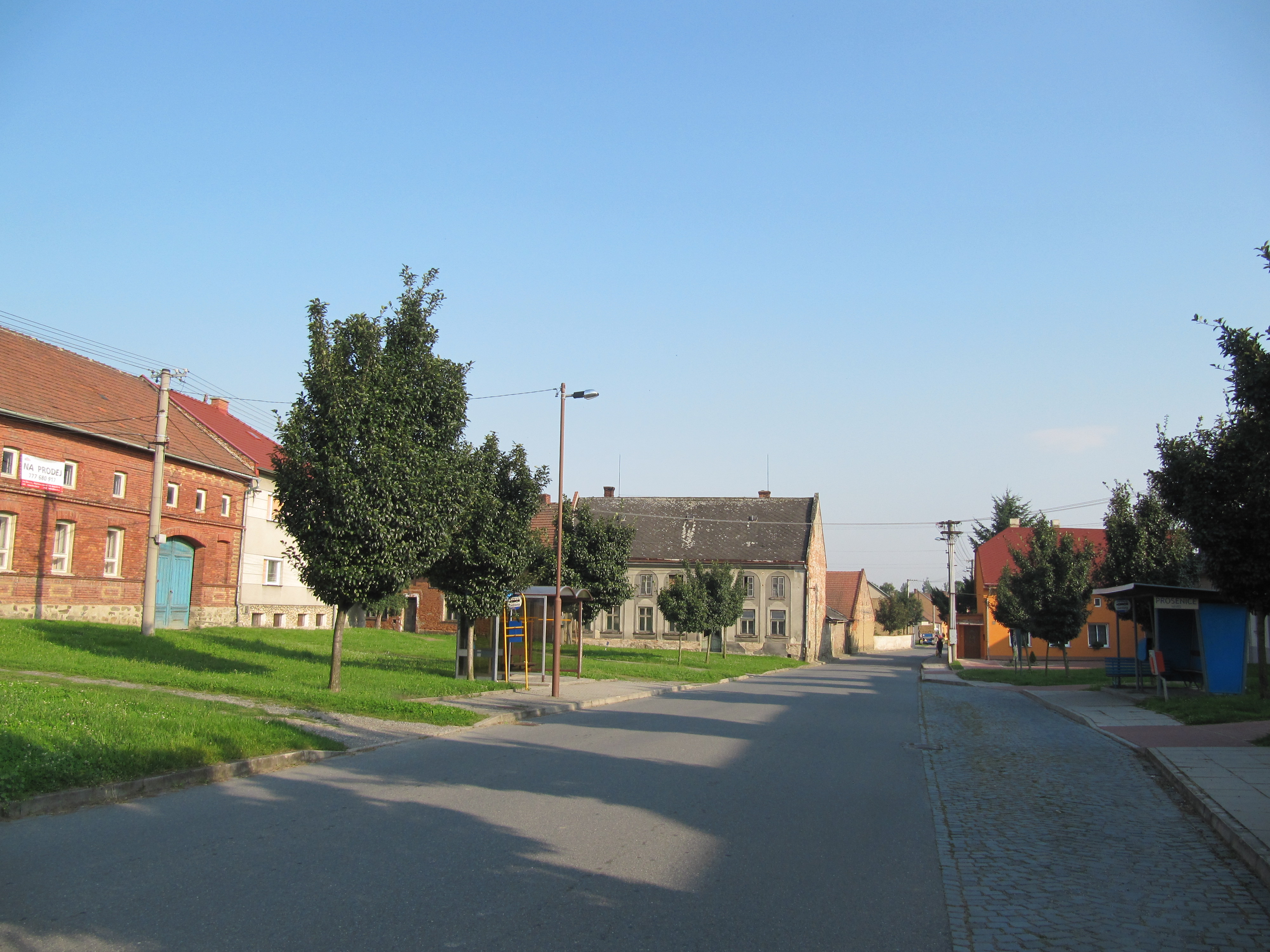
- Centre of Prosenice

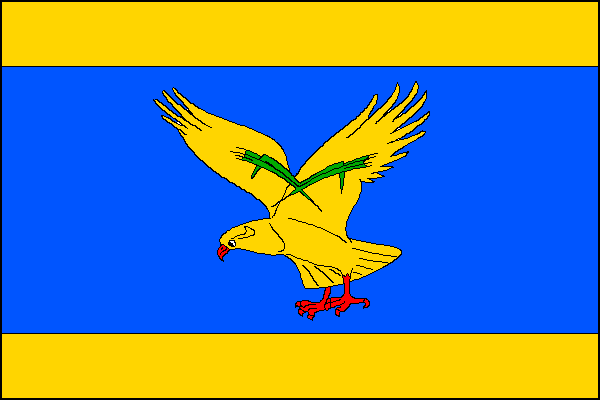
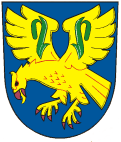
- Flag Coat of arms

- Location in the Czech Republic
- Coordinates: 49°29′20″N 17°29′3″E
- Country: Czech Republic
- Region: Olomouc
- District: Přerov
- First mentioned: 1358

Area
  - Total: 6.25 km^{2} (2.41 sq mi)
- Elevation: 219 m (719 ft)

Population (2026-01-01)
  - Total: 812
  - Density: 130/km^{2} (336/sq mi)
- Time zone: UTC+1 (CET)
  - Summer (DST): UTC+2 (CEST)
- Postal code: 751 21
- Website: www.obecprosenice.cz

Prosenice is a municipality and village in Přerov District in the Olomouc Region of the Czech Republic. It has about 800 inhabitants.

Prosenice lies approximately 5 kilometres (3 mi) north-east of Přerov, 21 km (13 mi) south-east of Olomouc, and 230 km (140 mi) east of Prague.

== Demographics ==
Historical population
Year	Pop.	±%
1869	560	—
1880	616	+10.0%
1890	765	+24.2%
1900	742	−3.0%
1910	805	+8.5%
1921	905	+12.4%
1930	992	+9.6%
1950	1,009	+1.7%
1961	1,114	+10.4%
1970	1,051	−5.7%
1980	939	−10.7%
1991	862	−8.2%
2001	838	−2.8%
2011	870	+3.8%
2021	752	−13.6%
Source: Censuses
