= Zámrsky =

- Municipality
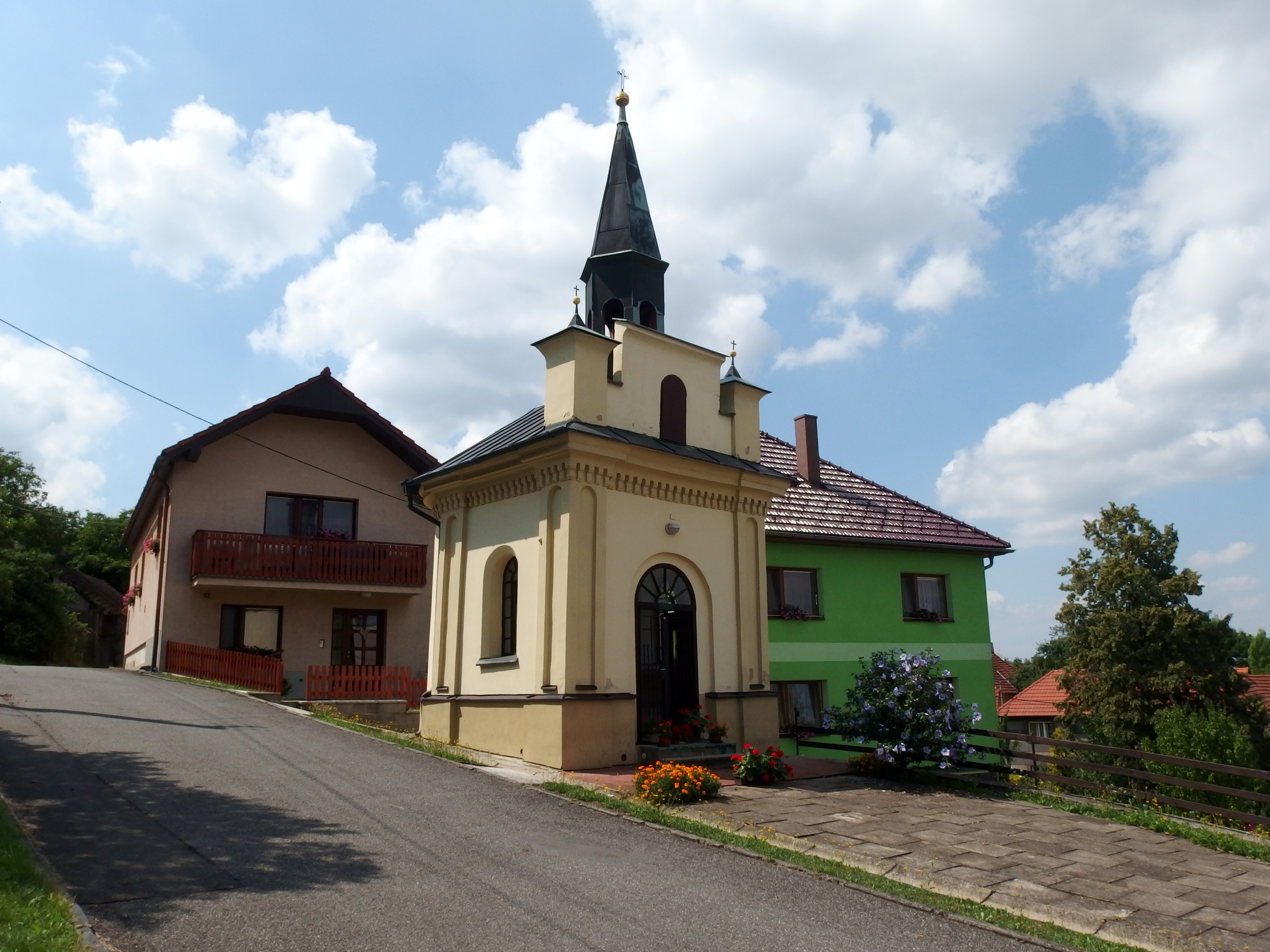
- Chapel of Our Lady of Hostýn

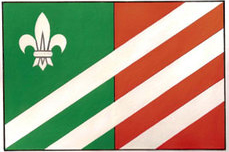
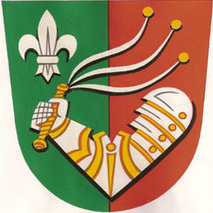
- Flag Coat of arms

- Location in the Czech Republic
- Coordinates: 49°30′23″N 17°49′40″E
- Country: Czech Republic
- Region: Olomouc
- District: Přerov
- First mentioned: 1141

Area
  - Total: 8.01 km^{2} (3.09 sq mi)
- Elevation: 340 m (1,120 ft)

Population (2026-01-01)
  - Total: 226
  - Density: 28.2/km^{2} (73.1/sq mi)
- Time zone: UTC+1 (CET)
  - Summer (DST): UTC+2 (CEST)
- Postal code: 753 01
- Website: www.zamrsky.cz

Zámrsky is a municipality and village in Přerov District in the Olomouc Region of the Czech Republic. It has about 200 inhabitants.

Zámrsky lies approximately 28 kilometres (17 mi) east of Přerov, 43 km (27 mi) east of Olomouc, and 253 km (157 mi) east of Prague.

== Demographics ==
Historical population
Year	Pop.	±%
1869	349	—
1880	395	+13.2%
1890	333	−15.7%
1900	343	+3.0%
1910	346	+0.9%
1921	464	+34.1%
1930	371	−20.0%
1950	394	+6.2%
1961	389	−1.3%
1970	271	−30.3%
1980	239	−11.8%
1991	205	−14.2%
2001	198	−3.4%
2011	207	+4.5%
2021	230	+11.1%
Source: Censuses
