= Grymov =

- Municipality
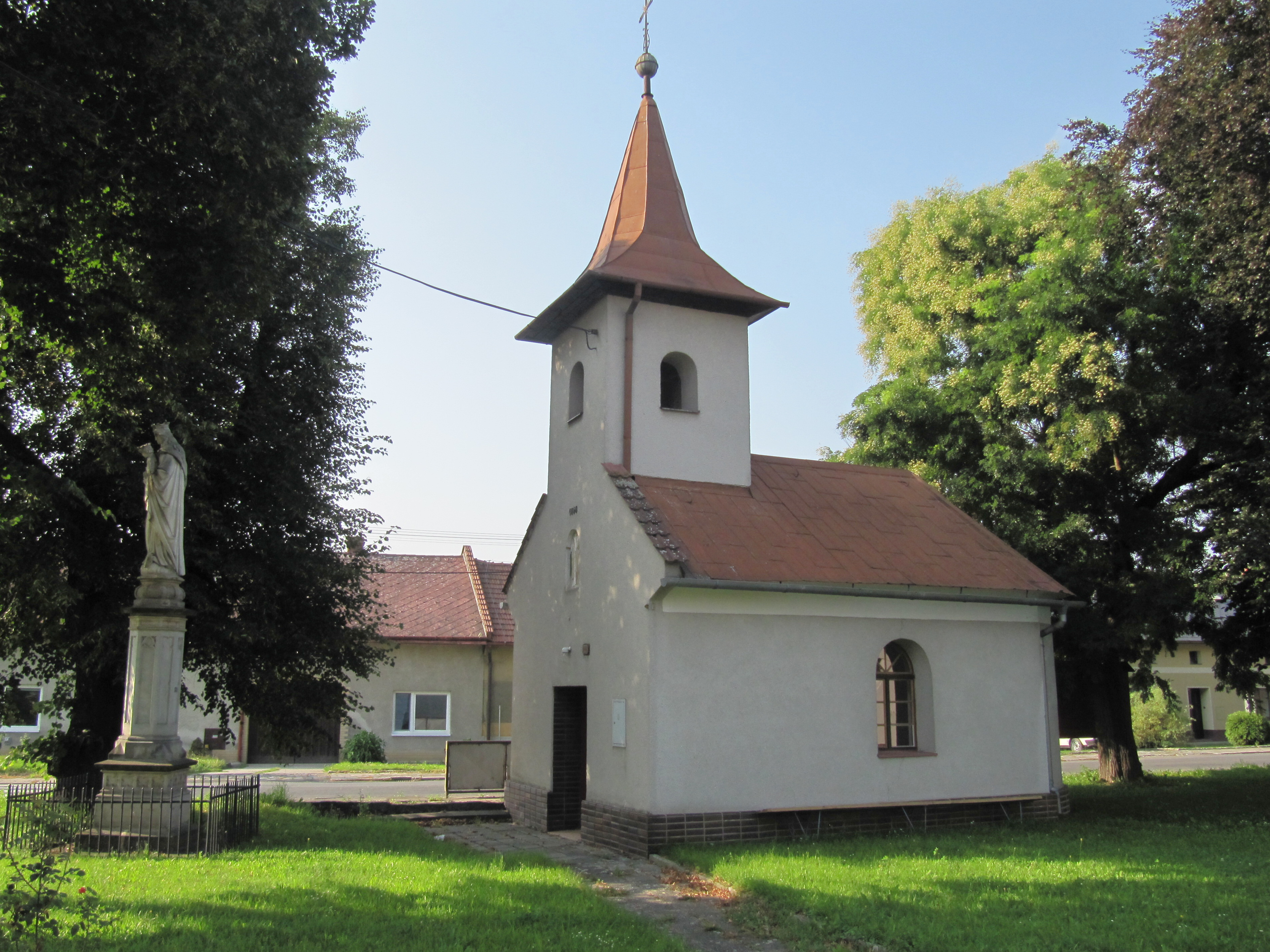
- Chapel of Saint John the Baptist

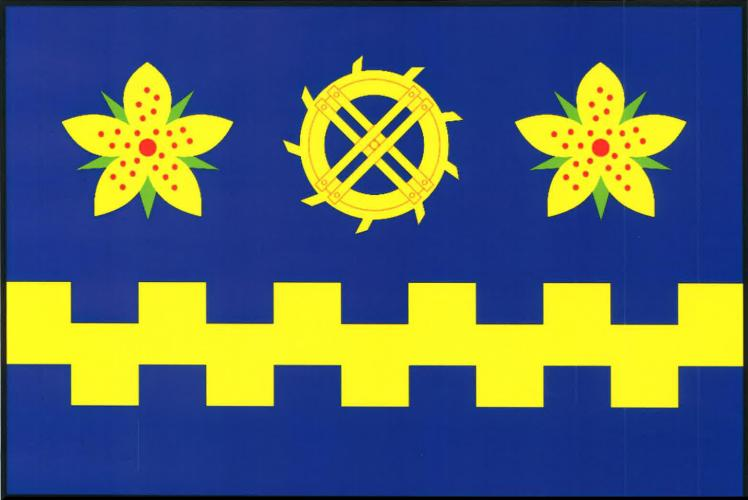
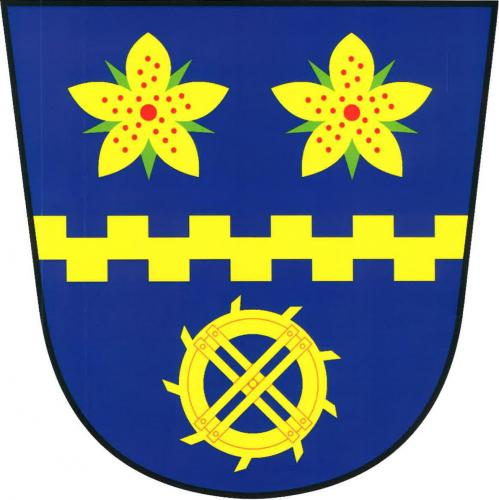
- Flag Coat of arms

- Location in the Czech Republic
- Coordinates: 49°28′52″N 17°29′53″E
- Country: Czech Republic
- Region: Olomouc
- District: Přerov
- Founded: 1787

Area
  - Total: 1.04 km^{2} (0.40 sq mi)
- Elevation: 216 m (709 ft)

Population (2026-01-01)
  - Total: 164
  - Density: 158/km^{2} (408/sq mi)
- Time zone: UTC+1 (CET)
  - Summer (DST): UTC+2 (CEST)
- Postal code: 751 21
- Website: www.grymov.cz

Grymov (German: Grimstal) is a municipality and village in Přerov District in the Olomouc Region of the Czech Republic. It has about 200 inhabitants.

Grymov lies approximately 5 kilometres (3 mi) north-east of Přerov, 22 km (14 mi) south-east of Olomouc, and 232 km (144 mi) east of Prague.

== Demographics ==
Historical population
Year	Pop.	±%
1869	159	—
1880	196	+23.3%
1890	194	−1.0%
1900	138	−28.9%
1910	187	+35.5%
1921	195	+4.3%
1930	190	−2.6%
1950	175	−7.9%
1961	187	+6.9%
1970	163	−12.8%
1980	143	−12.3%
1991	135	−5.6%
2001	136	+0.7%
2011	161	+18.4%
2021	145	−9.9%
Source: Censuses
