= Horní Radslavice =

- Municipality
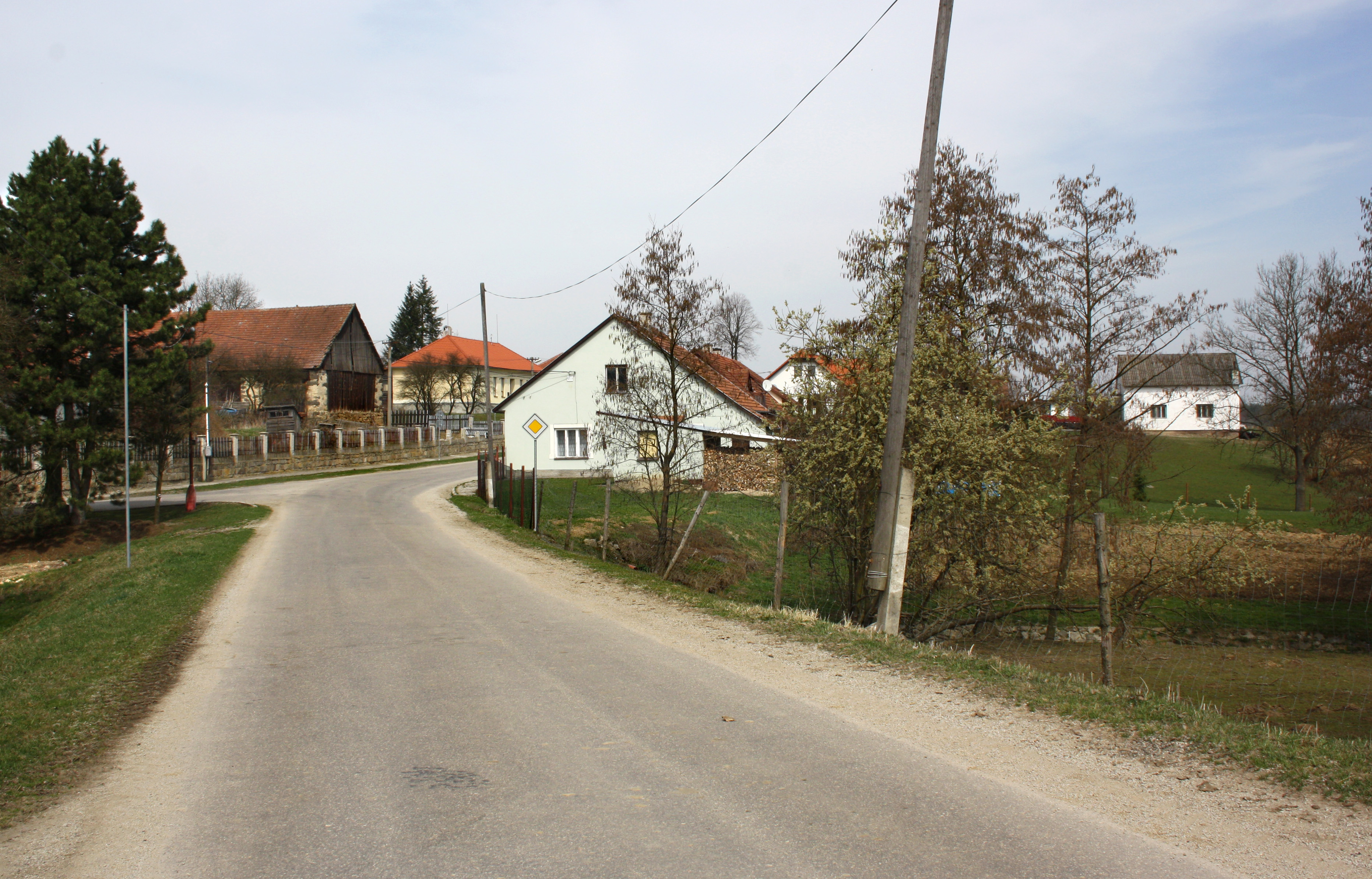
- Main street

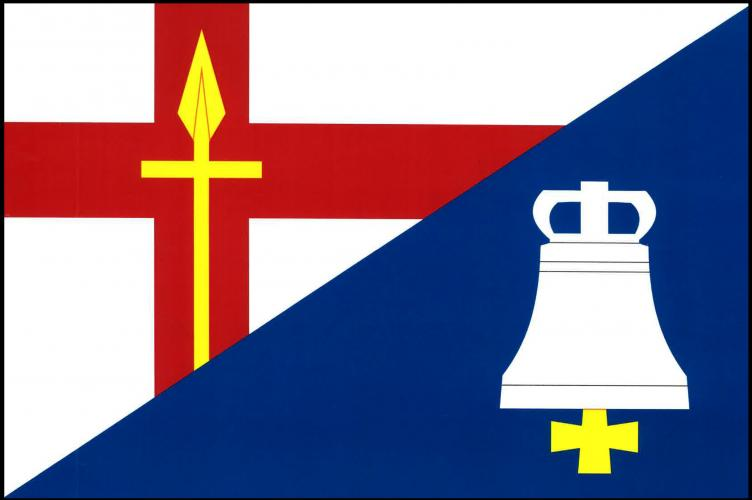
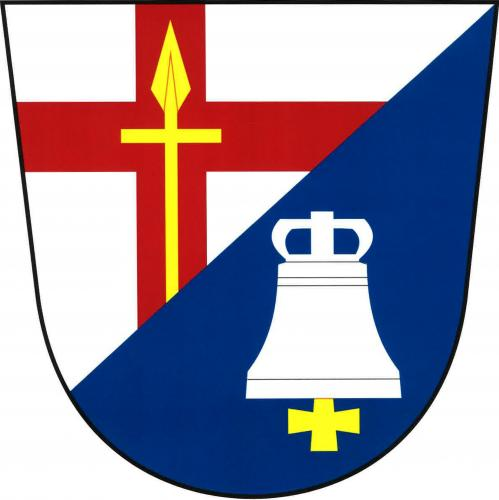
- Flag Coat of arms

- Location in the Czech Republic
- Coordinates: 49°20′18″N 15°54′8″E
- Country: Czech Republic
- Region: Vysočina
- District: Žďár nad Sázavou
- First mentioned: 1377

Area
  - Total: 4.67 km^{2} (1.80 sq mi)
- Elevation: 514 m (1,686 ft)

Population (2026-01-01)
  - Total: 101
  - Density: 21.6/km^{2} (56.0/sq mi)
- Time zone: UTC+1 (CET)
  - Summer (DST): UTC+2 (CEST)
- Postal code: 594 01
- Website: www.horniradslavice.cz

Horní Radslavice is a municipality and village in Žďár nad Sázavou District in the Vysočina Region of the Czech Republic. It has about 100 inhabitants.

Horní Radslavice lies approximately 26 kilometres (16 mi) south of Žďár nad Sázavou, 23 km (14 mi) east of Jihlava, and 135 km (84 mi) south-east of Prague.

== Demographics ==
Historical population
Year	Pop.	±%
1869	249	—
1880	273	+9.6%
1890	280	+2.6%
1900	254	−9.3%
1910	241	−5.1%
1921	251	+4.1%
1930	236	−6.0%
1950	186	−21.2%
1961	199	+7.0%
1970	174	−12.6%
1980	121	−30.5%
1991	102	−15.7%
2001	96	−5.9%
2011	91	−5.2%
2021	83	−8.8%
Source: Censuses
