= Mateřinka =

Theater biennial held in Liberec

Coordinates: 50°46′3.55″N 15°3′28.19″E

Mateřinka (a special Czech term, which means a play for children at the pre-school age) is a biennial festival of professional puppet theatre for children of the pre-school age organized by the Naivní divadlo theatre in Liberec, Czech Republic.

== History ==
The festival was established in 1972, when the cities of Liberec and České Budějovice were organizing in rotation the festival each year. Since 1991, the festival is organized in Liberec as a biennial festival.

== See also ==
- Serial Killer (festival)
- Gorolski Święto
