= Kočov =

- Municipality
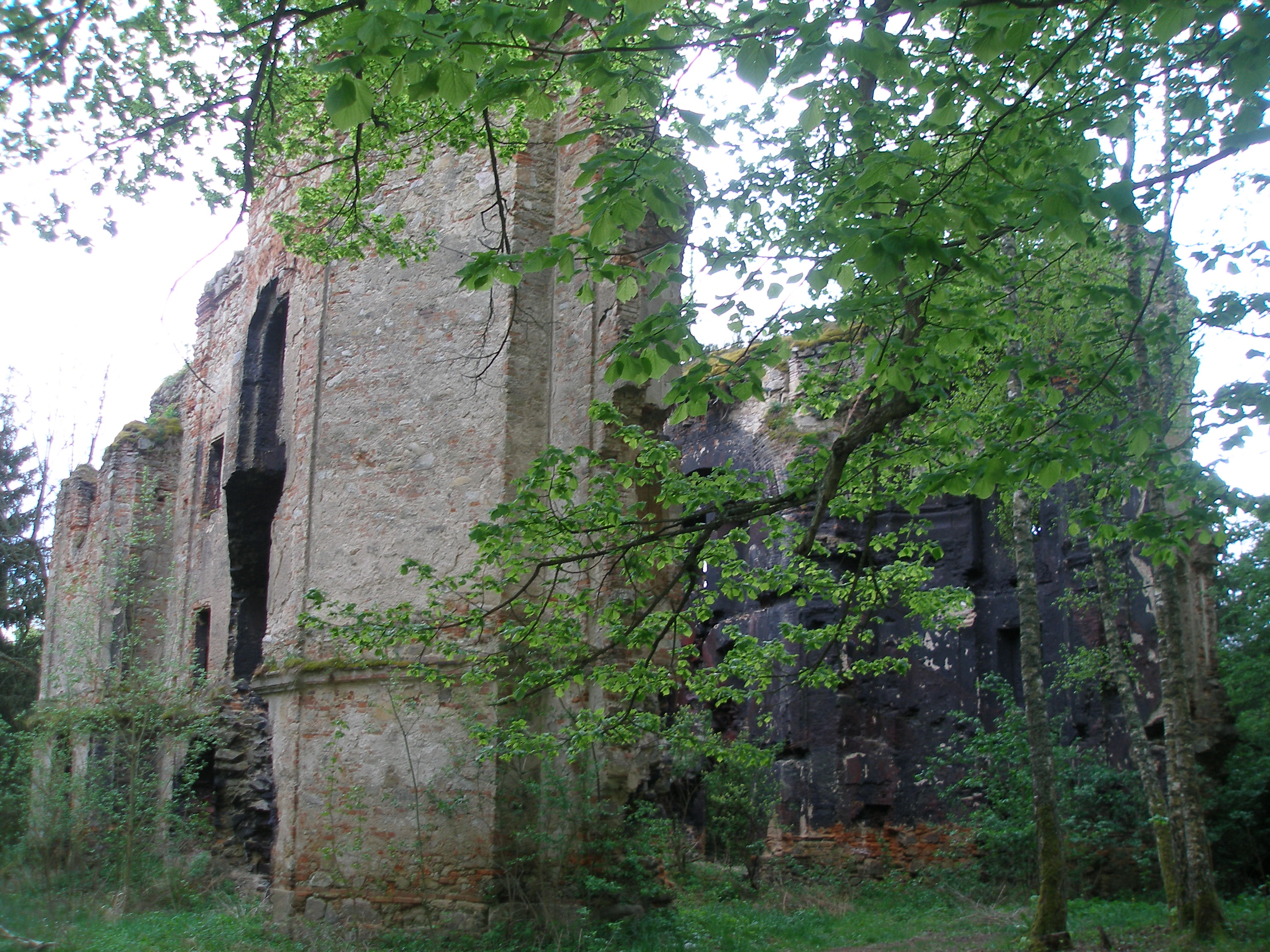
- Ruins of the Church of Saint John the Baptist

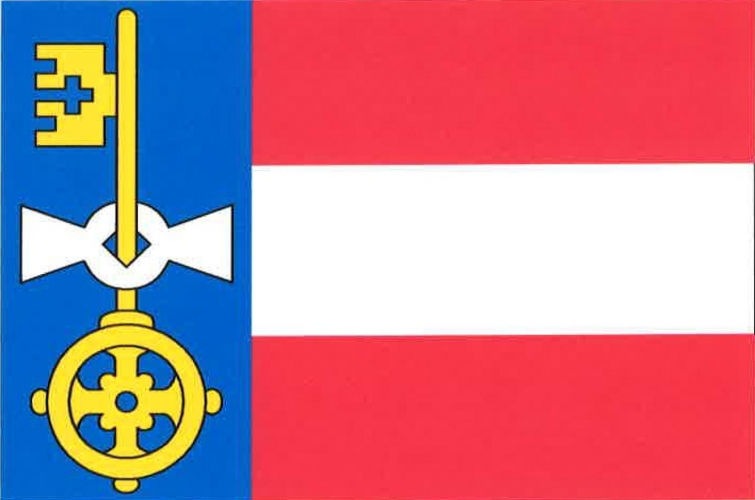
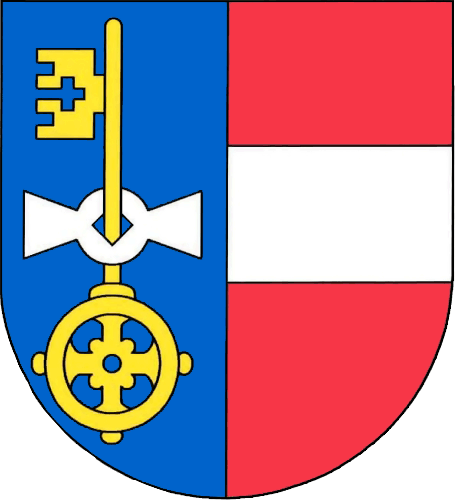
- Flag Coat of arms

- Location in the Czech Republic
- Coordinates: 49°48′32″N 12°44′12″E
- Country: Czech Republic
- Region: Plzeň
- District: Tachov
- First mentioned: 1357

Area
  - Total: 11.47 km^{2} (4.43 sq mi)
- Elevation: 465 m (1,526 ft)

Population (2026-01-01)
  - Total: 225
  - Density: 19.6/km^{2} (50.8/sq mi)
- Time zone: UTC+1 (CET)
  - Summer (DST): UTC+2 (CEST)
- Postal code: 348 15
- Website: www.obeckocov.cz

Kočov (German: Gottschau) is a municipality and village in Tachov District in the Plzeň Region of the Czech Republic. It has about 200 inhabitants.

Kočov lies approximately 9 kilometres (6 mi) east of Tachov, 47 km (29 mi) west of Plzeň, and 125 km (78 mi) west of Prague.

== Administrative division ==
Kočov consists of four municipal parts (in brackets population according to the 2021 census):

- Kočov (183)
- Janov (5)
- Klíčov (33)
- Ústí (2)

== Demographics ==
Historical population
Year	Pop.	±%
1869	565	—
1880	652	+15.4%
1890	612	−6.1%
1900	598	−2.3%
1910	585	−2.2%
1921	612	+4.6%
1930	580	−5.2%
1950	225	−61.2%
1961	201	−10.7%
1970	206	+2.5%
1980	210	+1.9%
1991	189	−10.0%
2001	208	+10.1%
2011	199	−4.3%
2021	223	+12.1%
Source: Censuses
