= Milotice nad Bečvou =

- Municipality
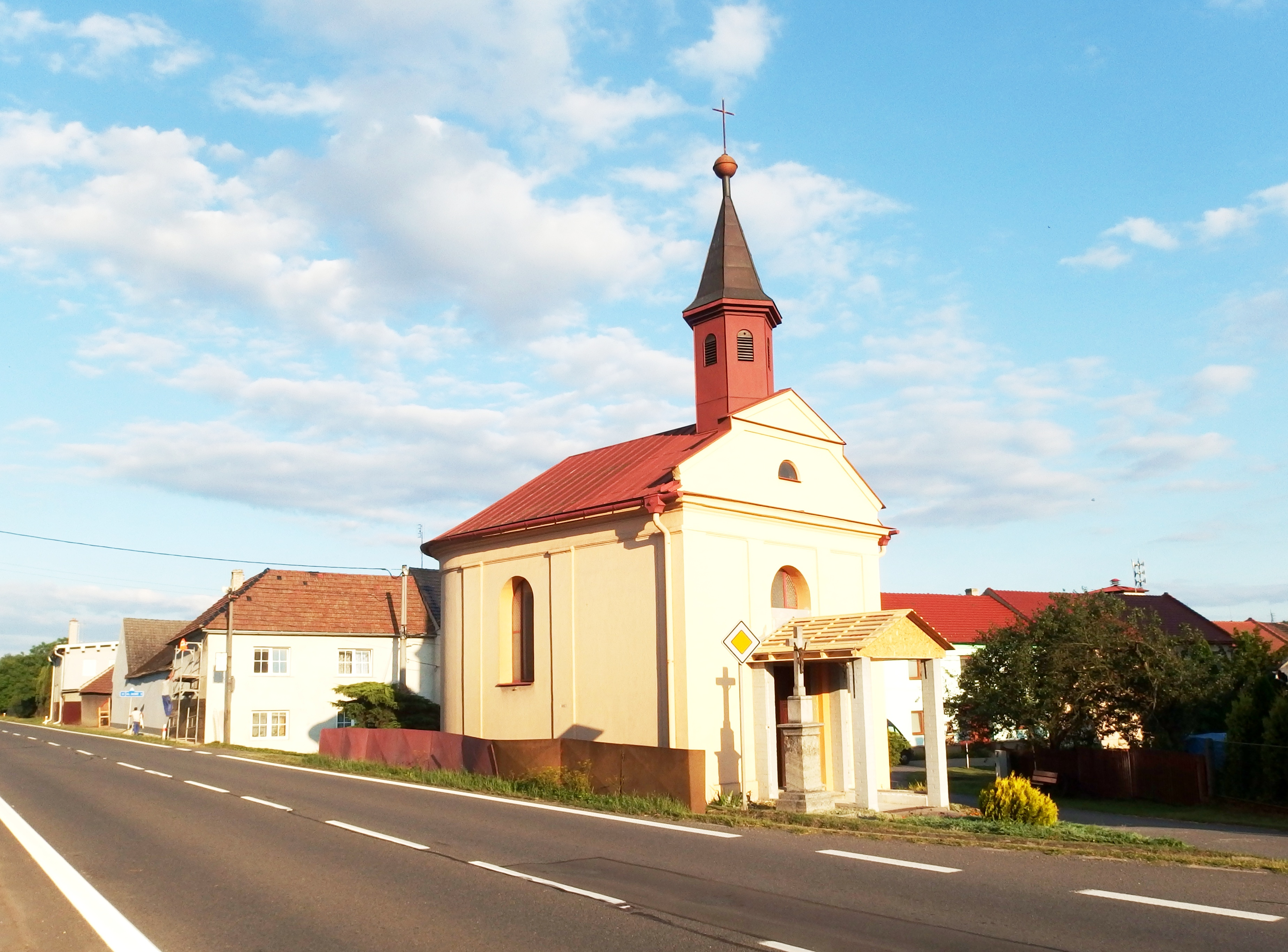
- Chapel of Saint Anne

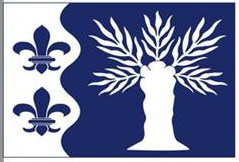
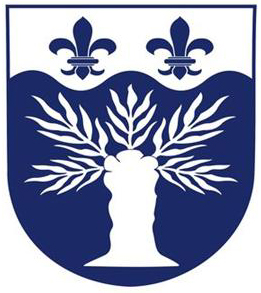
- Flag Coat of arms

- Location in the Czech Republic
- Coordinates: 49°32′11″N 17°50′23″E
- Country: Czech Republic
- Region: Olomouc
- District: Přerov
- First mentioned: 1141

Area
  - Total: 4.55 km^{2} (1.76 sq mi)
- Elevation: 264 m (866 ft)

Population (2026-01-01)
  - Total: 320
  - Density: 70/km^{2} (180/sq mi)
- Time zone: UTC+1 (CET)
  - Summer (DST): UTC+2 (CEST)
- Postal code: 753 67
- Website: www.miloticenadbecvou.cz

Milotice nad Bečvou is a municipality and village in Přerov District in the Olomouc Region of the Czech Republic. It has about 300 inhabitants.

Milotice nad Bečvou lies approximately 30 kilometres (19 mi) east of Přerov, 43 km (27 mi) east of Olomouc, and 254 km (158 mi) east of Prague.

== Demographics ==
Historical population
Year	Pop.	±%
1869	301	—
1880	326	+8.3%
1890	350	+7.4%
1900	367	+4.9%
1910	421	+14.7%
1921	416	−1.2%
1930	472	+13.5%
1950	368	−22.0%
1961	409	+11.1%
1970	371	−9.3%
1980	250	−32.6%
1991	218	−12.8%
2001	226	+3.7%
2011	288	+27.4%
2021	282	−2.1%
Source: Censuses
