= Týn nad Bečvou =

- Municipality
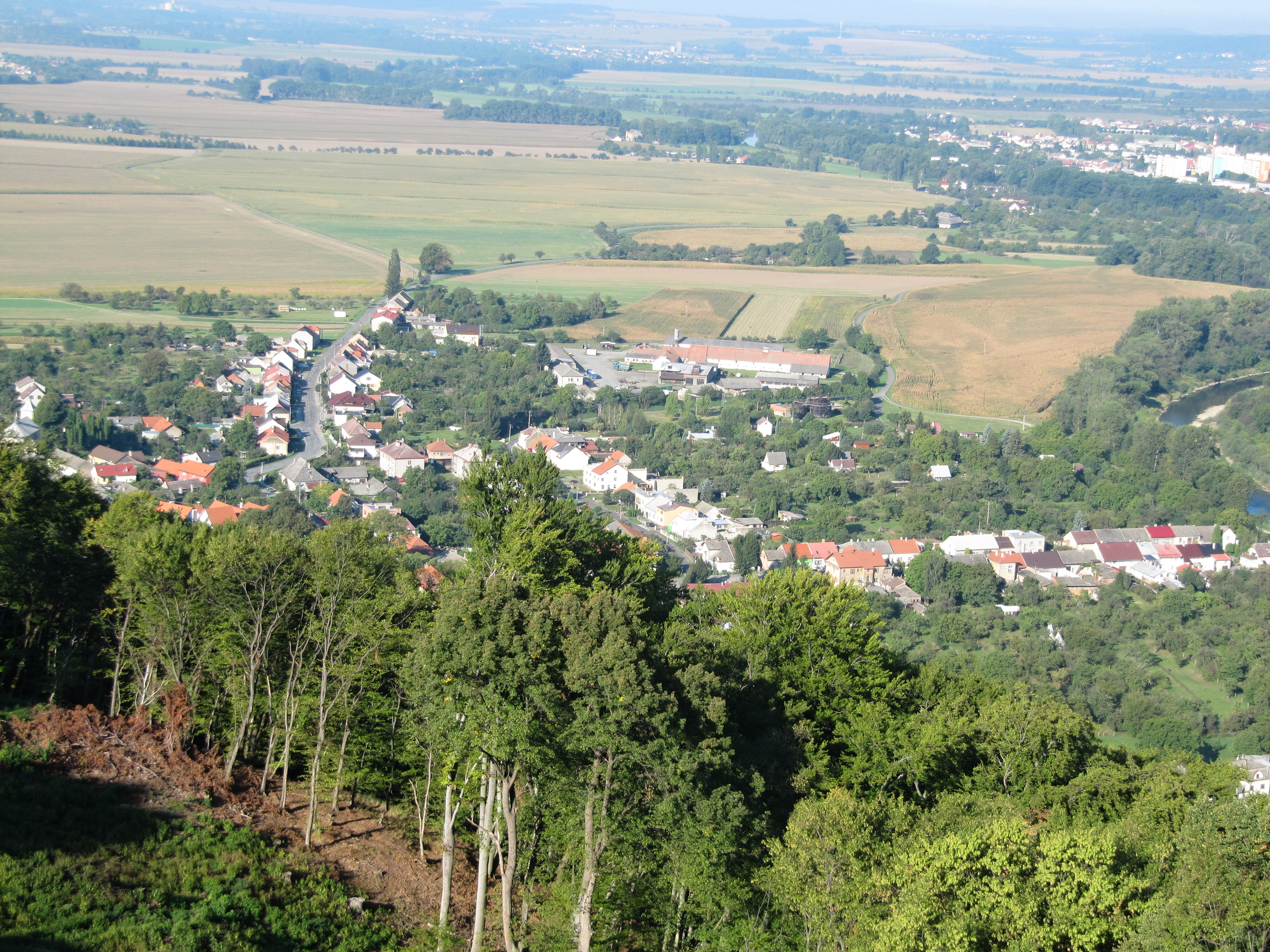
- General view

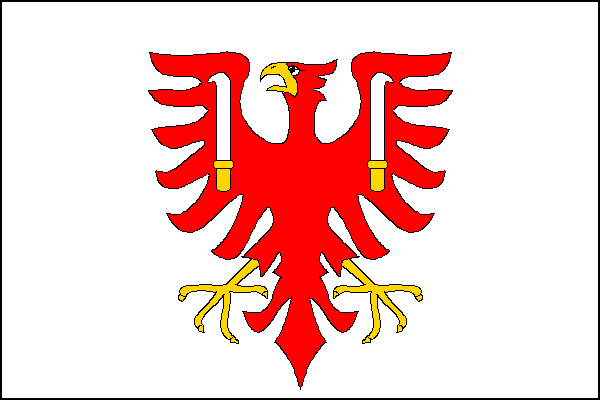
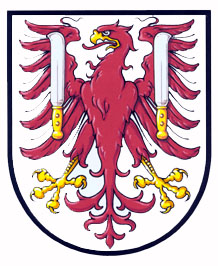
- Flag Coat of arms

- Location in the Czech Republic
- Coordinates: 49°31′1″N 17°37′5″E
- Country: Czech Republic
- Region: Olomouc
- District: Přerov
- First mentioned: 1447

Area
  - Total: 12.00 km^{2} (4.63 sq mi)
- Elevation: 238 m (781 ft)

Population (2026-01-01)
  - Total: 869
  - Density: 72.4/km^{2} (188/sq mi)
- Time zone: UTC+1 (CET)
  - Summer (DST): UTC+2 (CEST)
- Postal code: 751 31
- Website: www.tynnadbecvou.cz

Týn nad Bečvou (until 1949 Týn) is a municipality and village in Přerov District in the Olomouc Region of the Czech Republic. It has about 900 inhabitants.

Týn nad Bečvou lies approximately 14 kilometres (9 mi) north-east of Přerov, 29 km (18 mi) east of Olomouc, and 239 km (149 mi) east of Prague.

== Demographics ==
Historical population
| Year | Pop. | ±% |
|---|---|---|
| 1869 | 685 | — |
| 1880 | 745 | +8.8% |
| 1890 | 732 | −1.7% |
| 1900 | 765 | +4.5% |
| 1910 | 816 | +6.7% |
| 1921 | 806 | −1.2% |
| 1930 | 896 | +11.2% |
| 1950 | 891 | −0.6% |
| 1961 | 977 | +9.7% |
| 1970 | 932 | −4.6% |
| 1980 | 881 | −5.5% |
| 1991 | 776 | −11.9% |
| 2001 | 824 | +6.2% |
| 2011 | 821 | −0.4% |
| 2021 | 751 | −8.5% |
Source: Censuses

== Sights ==
Týn nad Bečvou is known for the Helfštýn Castle.
