= Radslavice (Přerov District) =

- Municipality
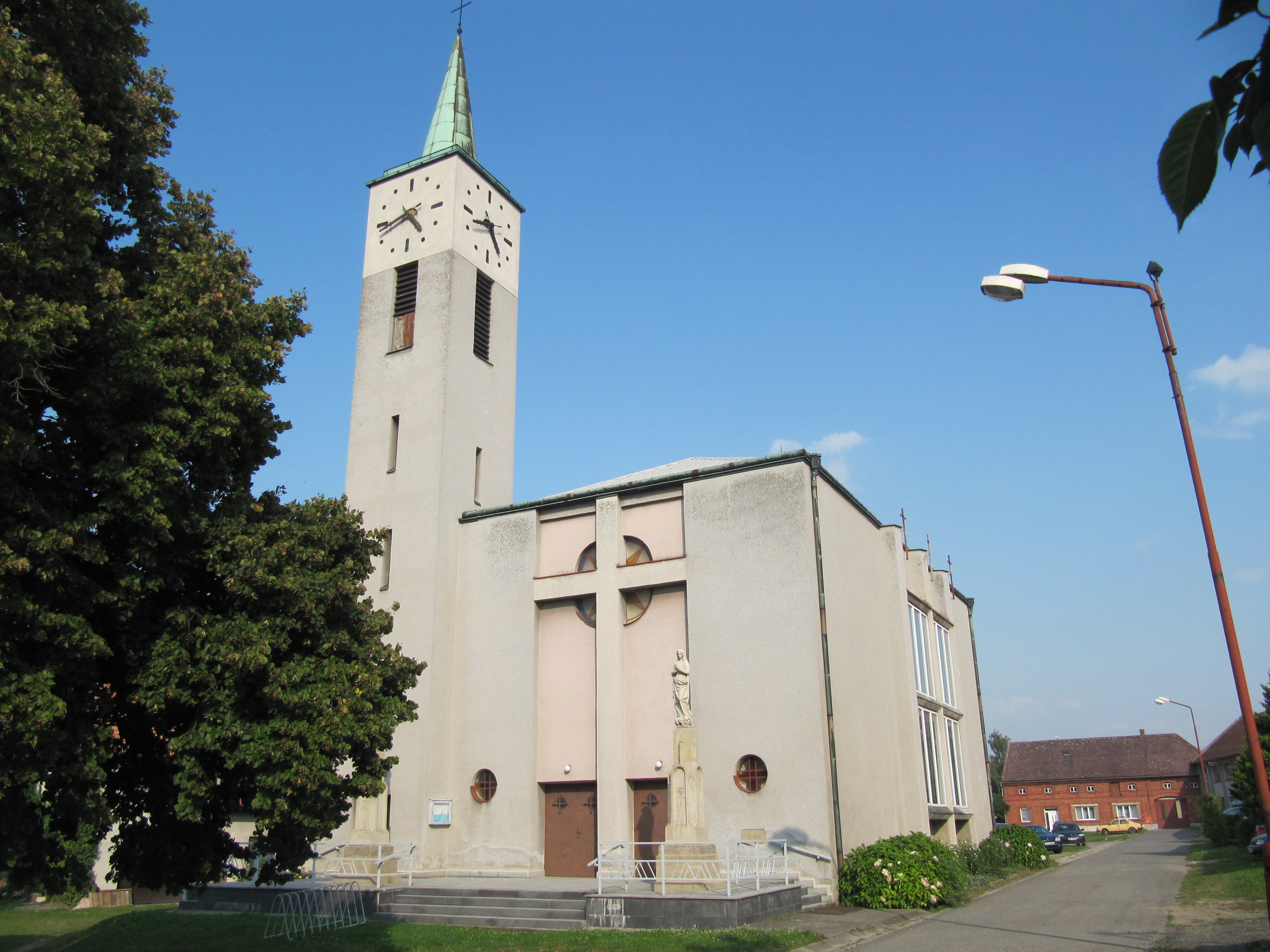
- Church of Saint Joseph

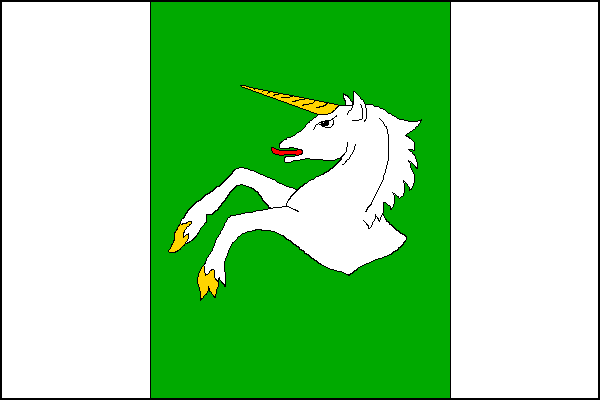
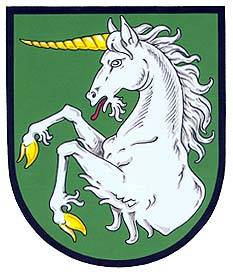
- Flag Coat of arms

- Location in the Czech Republic
- Coordinates: 49°28′41″N 17°31′0″E
- Country: Czech Republic
- Region: Olomouc
- District: Přerov
- First mentioned: 1375

Area
  - Total: 7.02 km^{2} (2.71 sq mi)
- Elevation: 223 m (732 ft)

Population (2026-01-01)
  - Total: 1,124
  - Density: 160/km^{2} (415/sq mi)
- Time zone: UTC+1 (CET)
  - Summer (DST): UTC+2 (CEST)
- Postal code: 751 11
- Website: www.radslavice.cz

Radslavice is a municipality and village in Přerov District in the Olomouc Region of the Czech Republic. It has about 1,100 inhabitants.

Radslavice lies approximately 5 kilometres (3 mi) north-east of Přerov, 23 km (14 mi) south-east of Olomouc, and 233 km (145 mi) east of Prague.

== History ==
The first written verified mention of Radslavice is from 1375. A forgery from 1269 also mentions Radslavice, but it is at least 50 years older.

== Demographics ==
Historical population
Year	Pop.	±%
1869	508	—
1880	551	+8.5%
1890	584	+6.0%
1900	627	+7.4%
1910	607	−3.2%
1921	691	+13.8%
1930	781	+13.0%
1950	731	−6.4%
1961	890	+21.8%
1970	871	−2.1%
1980	976	+12.1%
1991	1,008	+3.3%
2001	1,125	+11.6%
2011	1,095	−2.7%
2021	1,081	−1.3%
Source: Censuses

== Twin towns – sister cities ==
Radslavice is twinned with:

- Raslavice, Slovakia
