= Luboměř pod Strážnou =

- Municipality
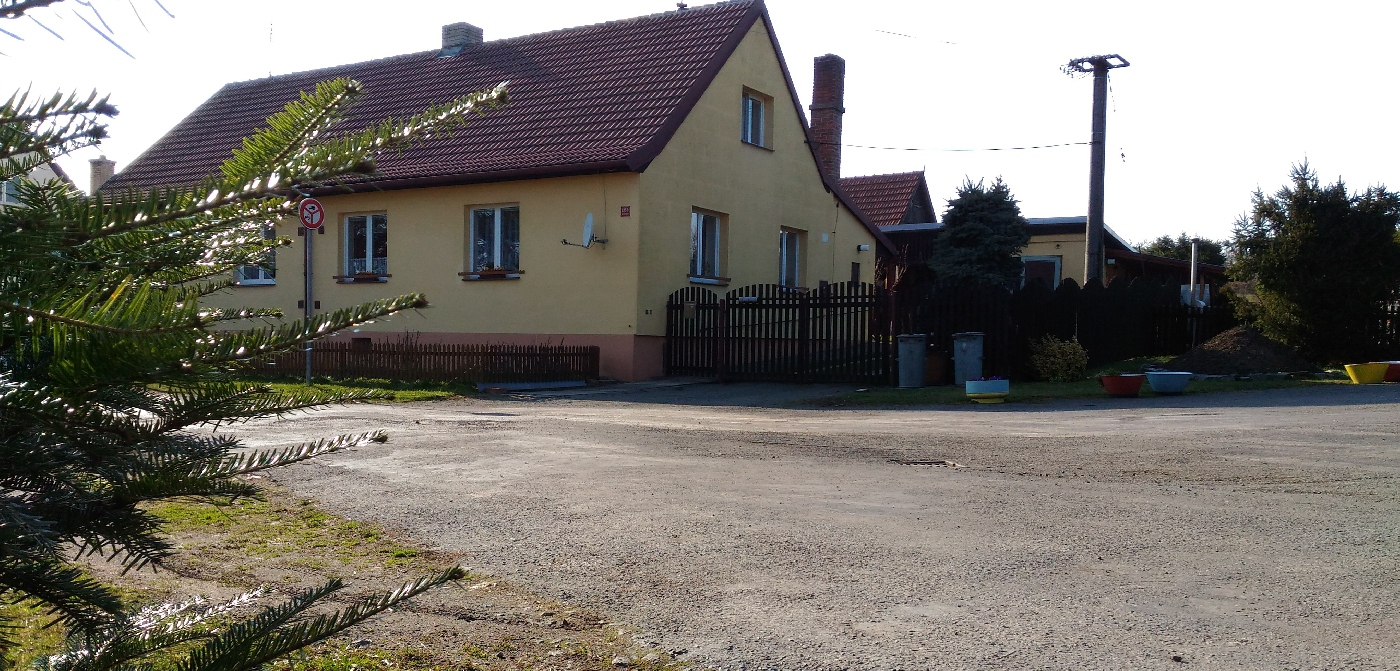
- Centre of Luboměř pod Strážnou

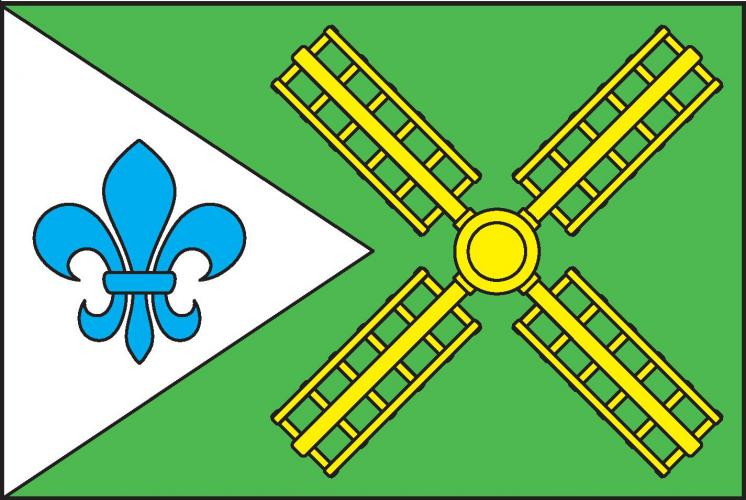
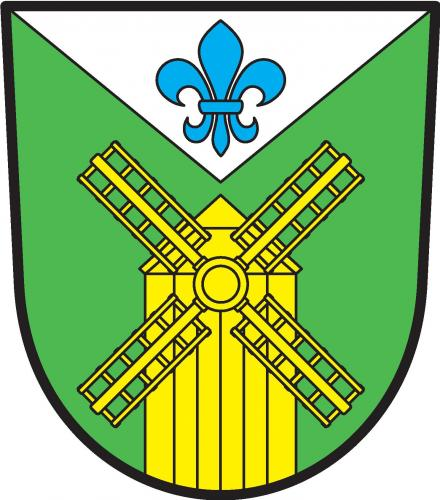
- Flag Coat of arms

- Location in the Czech Republic
- Coordinates: 49°41′24″N 17°39′39″E
- Country: Czech Republic
- Region: Olomouc
- District: Přerov
- First mentioned: 1394

Area
  - Total: 9.58 km^{2} (3.70 sq mi)
- Elevation: 600 m (2,000 ft)

Population (2026-01-01)
  - Total: 119
  - Density: 12.4/km^{2} (32.2/sq mi)
- Time zone: UTC+1 (CET)
  - Summer (DST): UTC+2 (CEST)
- Postal code: 753 62
- Website: www.lubomerps.cz

Luboměř pod Strážnou is a municipality and village in Přerov District in the Olomouc Region of the Czech Republic. It has about 100 inhabitants.

== History ==
The first written mention of Luboměř pod Strážnou is from 1394.

After World War II, the population was displaced and the municipality was incorporated into the newly established Libavá Military Training Area. The territory of the village was used to accommodate employees, which saved it from complete extinction. Luboměř pod Strážnou became again a separate municipality on 1 January 2016 by reduction of Libavá Military Training Area.

== Demographics ==
Historical population
Year	Pop.	±%
1869	424	—
1880	434	+2.4%
1890	429	−1.2%
1900	386	−10.0%
1910	390	+1.0%
1921	375	−3.8%
1930	375	+0.0%
1950	0	−100.0%
1961	179	—
1970	153	−14.5%
1980	175	+14.4%
1991	149	−14.9%
2001	154	+3.4%
2011	123	−20.1%
2021	105	−14.6%
Source: Censuses
