= Paršovice =

- Municipality
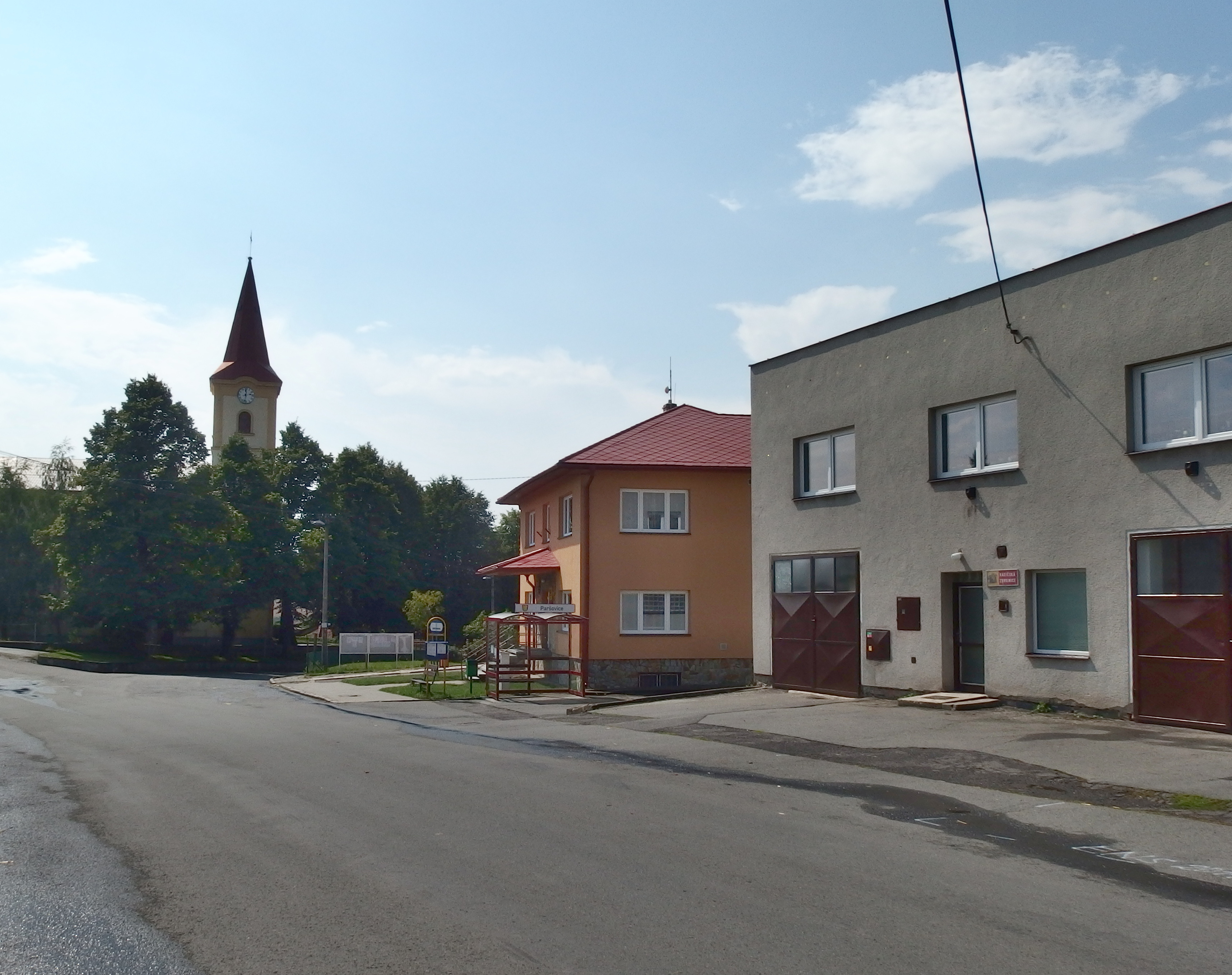
- Church of Saint Margaret, municipal office and firehouse

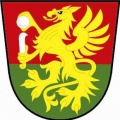
- Flag Coat of arms

- Location in the Czech Republic
- Coordinates: 49°30′3″N 17°42′31″E
- Country: Czech Republic
- Region: Olomouc
- District: Přerov
- First mentioned: 1141

Area
  - Total: 13.56 km^{2} (5.24 sq mi)
- Elevation: 322 m (1,056 ft)

Population (2026-01-01)
  - Total: 389
  - Density: 28.7/km^{2} (74.3/sq mi)
- Time zone: UTC+1 (CET)
  - Summer (DST): UTC+2 (CEST)
- Postal code: 753 55
- Website: www.obecparsovice.cz

Paršovice is a municipality and village in Přerov District in the Olomouc Region of the Czech Republic. It has about 400 inhabitants.

Paršovice lies approximately 19 kilometres (12 mi) east of Přerov, 34 km (21 mi) east of Olomouc, and 244 km (152 mi) east of Prague.

== Demographics ==
Historical population
Year	Pop.	±%
1869	296	—
1880	317	+7.1%
1890	311	−1.9%
1900	328	+5.5%
1910	350	+6.7%
1921	357	+2.0%
1930	374	+4.8%
1950	336	−10.2%
1961	370	+10.1%
1970	372	+0.5%
1980	360	−3.2%
1991	374	+3.9%
2001	374	+0.0%
2011	406	+8.6%
2021	394	−3.0%
Source: Censuses
