= Dědice (Vyškov) =

- Municipal part of Vyškov
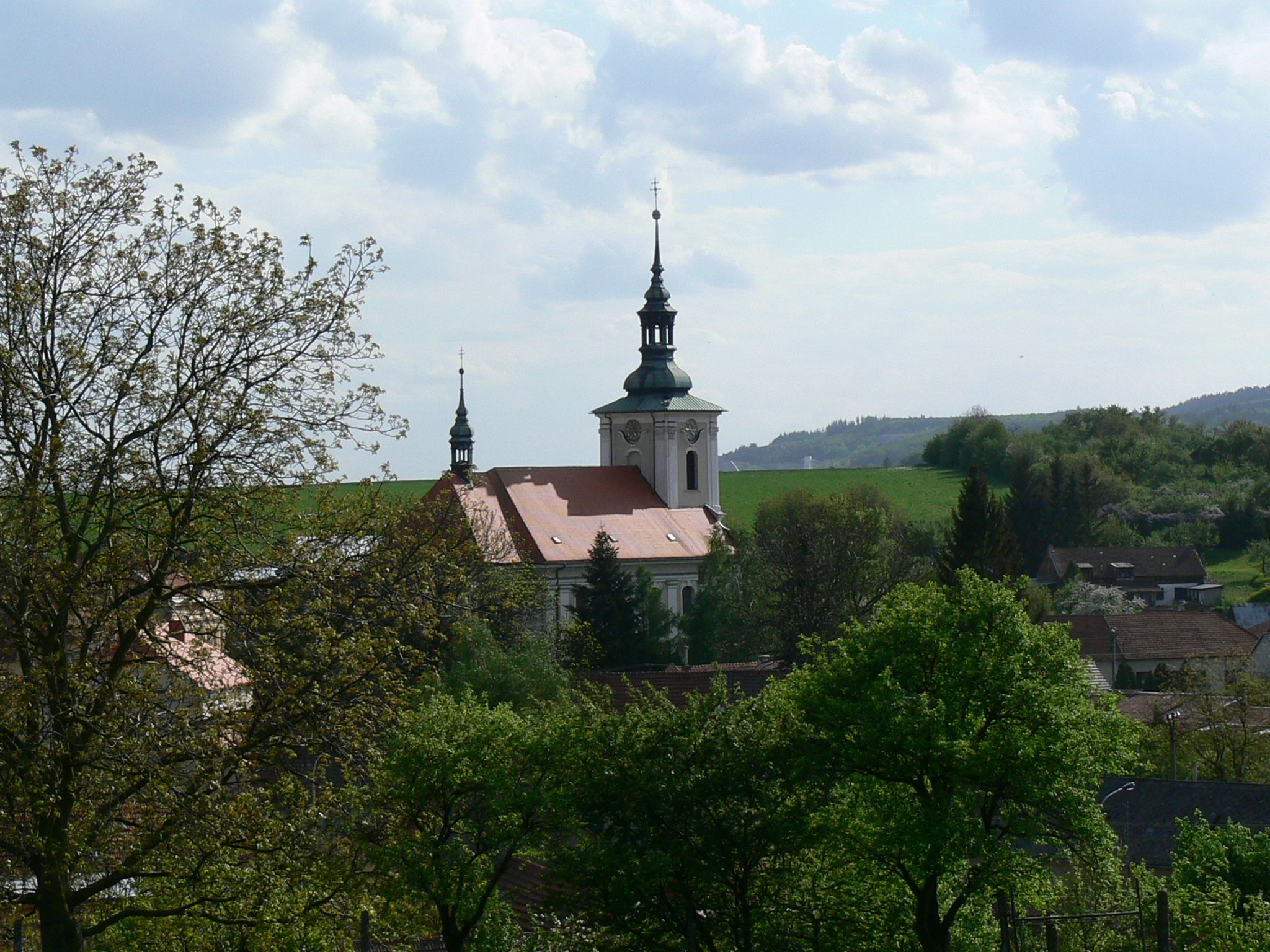
- Centre of Dědice with church

- Location in the Czech Republic
- Coordinates: 49°17′40″N 16°58′38″E
- Country: Czech Republic
- Region: South Moravian
- District: Vyškov
- Municipality: Vyškov
- First mentioned: 1141

Area
  - Total: 10.09 km^{2} (3.90 sq mi)
- Elevation: 258 m (846 ft)

Population (2021)
  - Total: 5,668
  - Density: 561.7/km^{2} (1,455/sq mi)
- Time zone: UTC+1 (CET)
  - Summer (DST): UTC+2 (CEST)
- Postal code: 682 01

Recording of the bell ringing of the Church of the Holy Trinity in Dědice

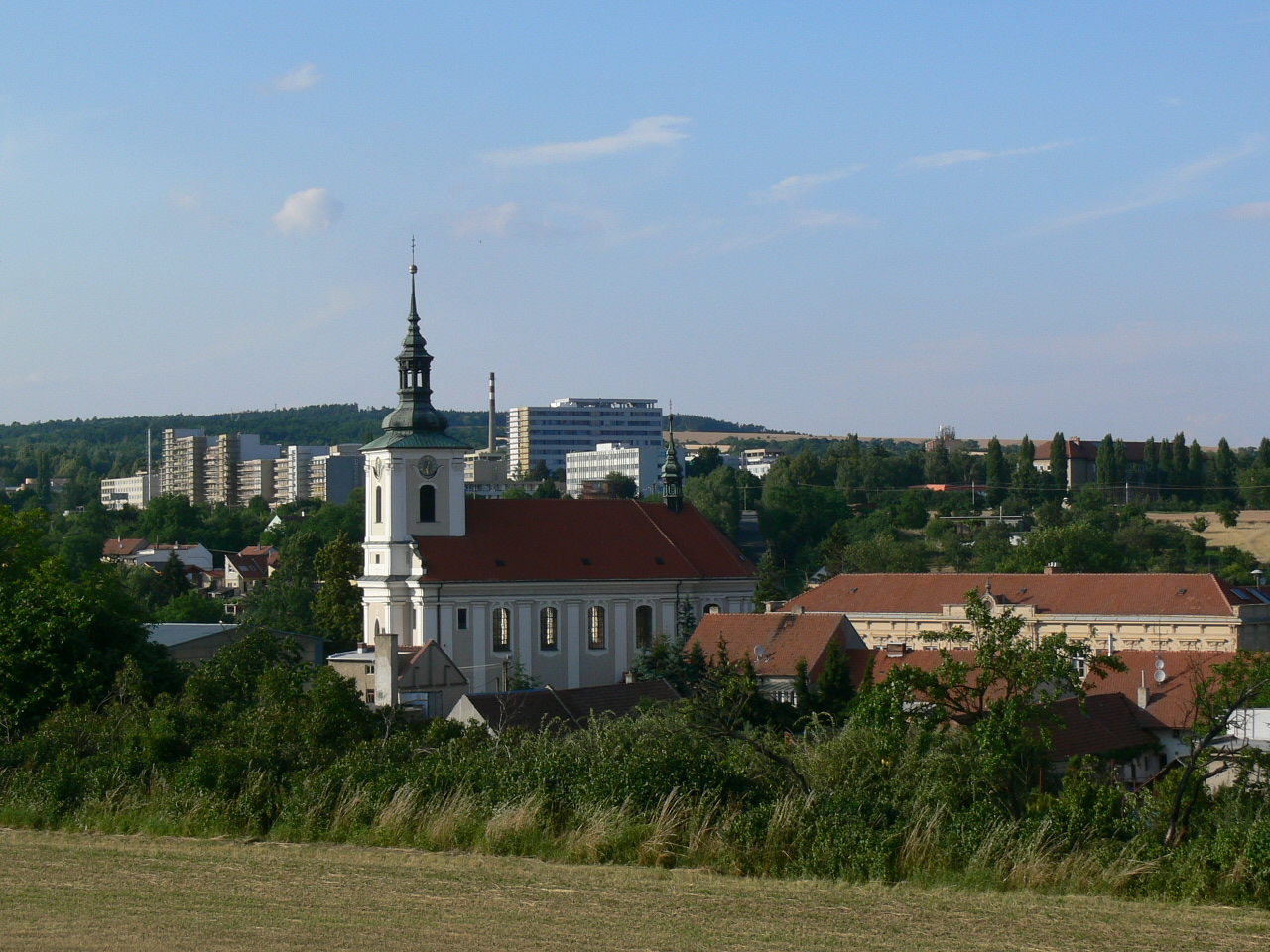
View of the Church of the Holy Trinity and the building formerly used for the medical school; in the background a barracks and a military school

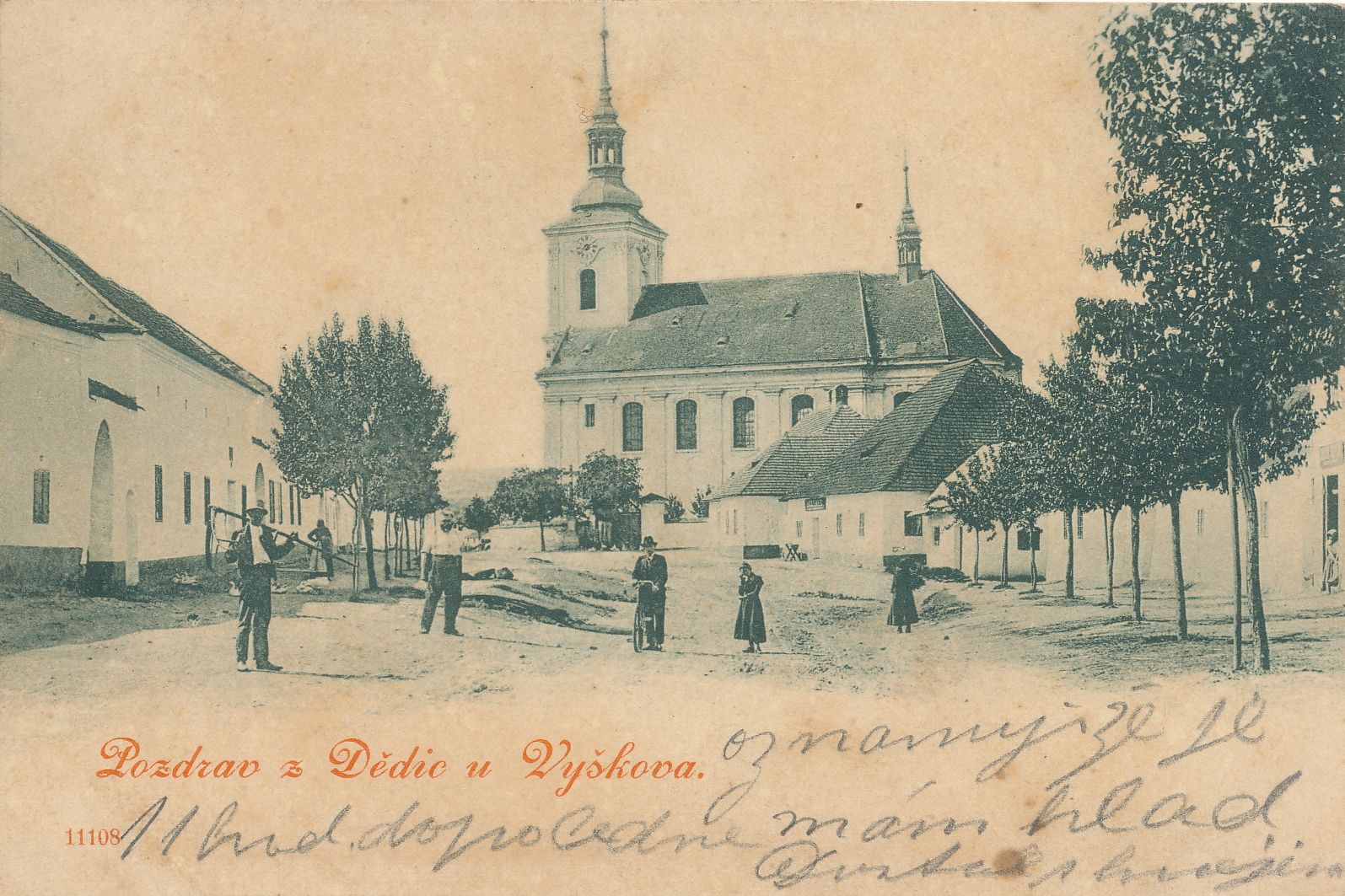
Historical view from 1899

Dědice is a municipal part of the town of Vyškov in the South Moravian Region of the Czech Republic. According to archaeological findings, Dědice is one of the oldest settlements in Moravia. In the town there is a parish church of the Holy Trinity, in the tower of which there is a protected area, in which Greater mouse-eared bat stays during the summer. There have been military barracks in Dědice since 1935.

Dědice is also the alleged birthplace of Klement Gottwald, who used to have an exhibition hall in Revoluční Street in the so-called "birth house of Klement Gottwald (1954)". This building, to which, after the modifications begun in May 1954 crowds of schoolchildren and workers were bound to go, is publicly accepted by historians after the Velvet Revolution as a place where Gottwald was not born with certainty.

== Geography ==
Dědice is located at the southern foot of the Drahany Hills at the confluence of the Velká Haná and Malá Haná streams into the Haná. To the north extends the military training area Březina. To the north rises the highest point of the territory Kozí horka, at 361 metres (1,184 ft).

Dědice borders independent municipalities Radslavice in the northwest and Drnovice in the west.

A significant change in the territorial scope and course of the cadastral border in the north was brought about in the mid-1930s by the creation of a military training area, when Dědice lost a significant part of the continuous forest in this area, on the left bank of the Velká Haná.

== Name ==
The name is historically documented in documents and official books from the 12th century. The way of writing changed: (1141) Dedicih; 1278 de Diedicz; 1295 de Tiediz; 1371 oppidi nostri Diedicz..., in Diedycz..., in Dyedycz; 1376 in villa Diedicz; 1381 Dyedycz; 1398 in villa Dyedycz, prope Wysskow 1406 oppidi nostri Diedicz; 1442 market town Dědice; 1482 in the village Dědice; 1492 in the village Diediczych; 1512 from Diedicz; 1531 in the market town Diediczich; 1536 town Diedicze; 1633 Dědice; 1656 ex Dieditz; 1671 rector of Diediczky; 1675 market town, Dieditz; 1708/12 Dietitz, unfortified town; 1718 and 1751 Dieditz; 1880s (I. military mapping) Dieditz; 1846 Dieditz, Dědice; 1850 Dědice = Dieditz (with settlements Hamiltony, Pazderna), character not specified; 1880 small town; 1890 Dědice = Děditz; 1924 Dědice; 1940 Dieditz = Dědice; 1941 settlement of Vyškov; 1945 Dědice, municipality; 1949 settlement of Vyškov.

== History ==
=== Medieval ===
The first written mention of Dědice is in document issued by the Bishop of Olomouc Jindřich Zdík, originally dated from 1131. The document deals with the transfer of the seat of the diocese from the older church of St. Peter's Church to the newly consecrated Church of St. Wenceslas in Olomouc. The deed lists all real estate of the Olomouc diocese in Moravia. One field from the territorial scope of Dědice (one plow) belonged to the Olomouc church at that time, and thus to the bishop of Olomouc. It was about 18.5 hectares. The document contains the daily date of 30 June, but has no date inscription.

The year 1131 is mentioned in the Codex diplomaticus et epistolaris Moraviae I, issued by Antonín Boček in 1836, and in the Codex diplomaticus et epistolaris regni Bohemiae I, issued by Gustav Friedrich at the beginning of the 20th century. Modern research carried out in the second half of the 20th century revised the previous chronology of the charter and moved it to 1141. Although the exact date of the charter is not known, its very existence proves that Dědice was settled before it was written. However, further adjustments to the dating cannot be ruled out, although the opinion postponing the time of the creation of the document to the time around 1135 has not yet been unequivocally accepted.

In 1241, during the campaign against the Tatars, Jaroslav of Šternberk (a fictional figure of the Šternberk family and Moravian history) stopped here. At the end of the 13th century, Dědice was owned by Milota of Dědice (1252–1307), who came from the Benešovici family, who had an abrasion in his coat of arms - a coiled bullet. His name is documented in the form of Milota de Dieditz in the years 1278–1295. From the fact that Milota was written after Dědice in 1278 for the first time, it can be concluded that the heritage castle was built shortly before and that it was the seat where he lived most often.

At the beginning of the 14th century, the Šternberks acquired Dědice. Bishop Albrecht Aleš of Šternberk granted Dědice numerous rights and privileges. Albrecht and his nephew Petr of Šternberk confirmed the fair to Dědice in 1371. The confirmation states that the weekly Monday market took place in Dědice since ancient times. Neighbors were for a certain ransom freed from robots and distant wagon robots (for a salary of 4 hryvnia), and from escheat. Dědice were allowed to use manorial forests older than six years for grazing in places declared to them by burgrave of Dědice. By the fact that they were not subject to escheat, they were free to bequeath their property to anyone. These rights have been revoked and renewed many times over time. In 1381, Petr of Šternberk registered a dowry for his wife Anna on the Dědice estate.

After the death of Peter of Šternberk (1397) Dědice was inherited by his brother-in-law Petr Plumlovský of Kravaře, who in the same year sold in the part of Dědice, which is closer to Vyškov, to the Augustinian monastery 16 fields without a quarter, 6 pubs, 4 seats and 5 levels 941 groschen hryvnia. In 1406, he confirmed the city's privileges to Dědice. In this way, Dědice have since been divided into two parts. After the death of Peter of Kravaře and Plumlov in 1411, most of it was in the possession of his son Jindřich Plumlovský of Kravař, who fell at the Battle of Vyšehrad in 1420. Because he had no descendants, Dědice first passed to his cousin Petr Strážnický of Kravař († 1434), and then to the son of Petr Strážnický of Kravaře, Jiří of Kravař and Strážnice, who in 1442 confirmed the city's privileges to Dědice.

In 1460, King George of Poděbrady confirmed the part of Dědice, Nezamyslice, the Buděcko plant with an oak forest and Laškov to the Lanškroun monastery in Olomouc (the Augustinian monastery of All Saints). The Lords of Kravaře owned Dědice until the second half of the 15th century. After the death of Jiří of Kravaře and Strážnice Dědice in 1466, Václav of Boskovice married a daughter of Jiří of Kravaře and Strážnice Kunka of Kravaře and Strážnice. Kunka of Kravaře and Strážnice bequeathed Dědice to Ladislav of Boskovice. The Boskovics held Dědice until 1537.

=== Modern age ===
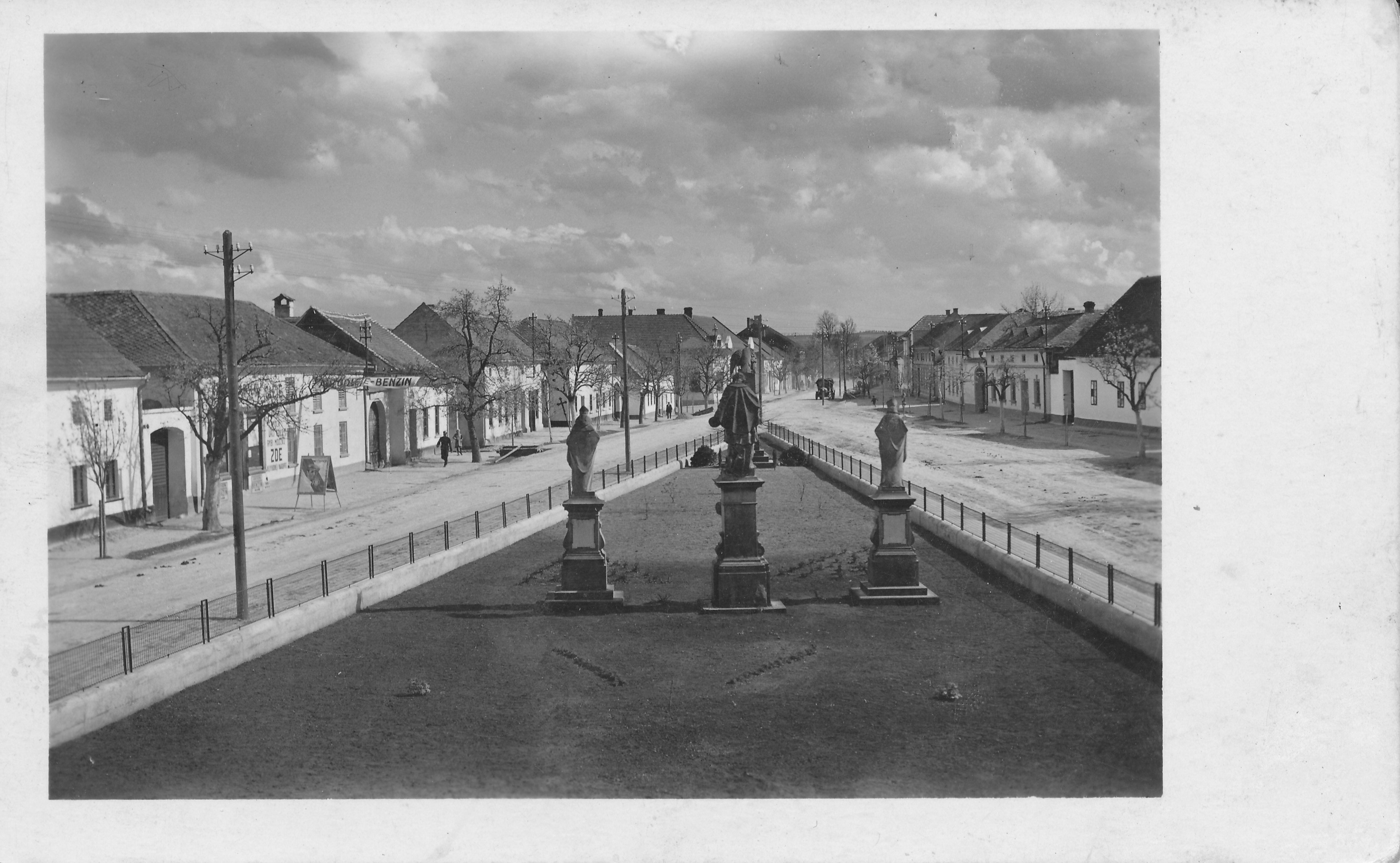
Square in front of the town hall in Dědice in the 1930s with statues of Saints Cyril and Methodius (1901) and John of Nepomuk (1826). In front of them stands a monument to the victims of the First World War

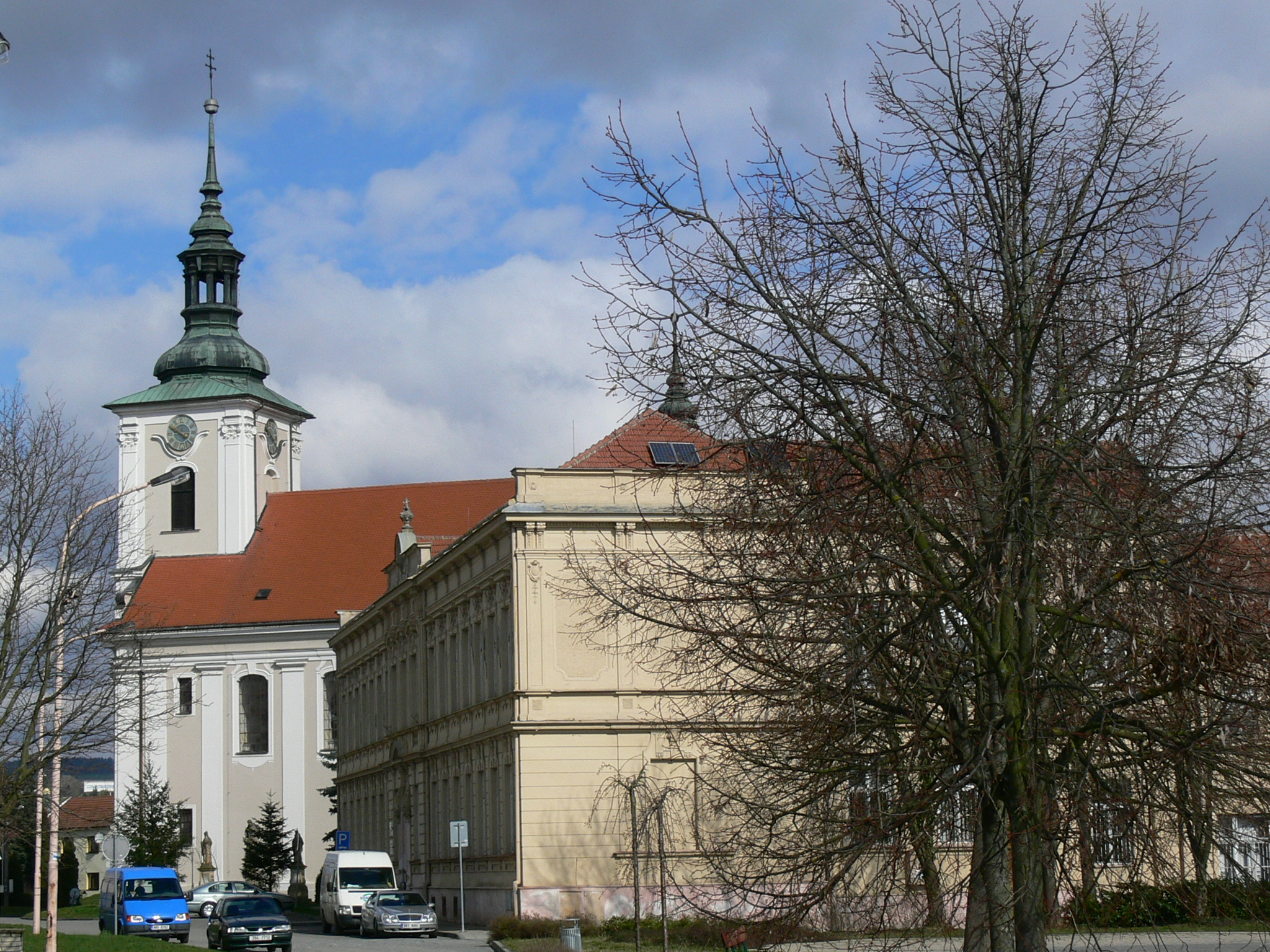
Church of the Holy Trinity and Secondary Medical School

On the basis of partial contracts between Dobeš Černohorský of Boskovice and John Černohorský of Boskovice, Dobeš acquired Dědice. In 1533 Dobeš changed statute labours to Dědice, Lhota, Opatovice, Rychtářov, and Radslavice, and in 1537 he put his part in Dědice with his serfs, Lhota with the courtyard of the old castle, Rychtářov with a desolate castle, Opatovice and Radslavice to John IV of Pernštejn (sold for 6800 Moravian gold pieces). In 1538, Dědice consisted of two parts, one of which belonged to the Lanškroun monastery from 1397, which moved to Olomouc during the Hussite wars. The second was a permanent fief of the Bishop of Olomouc. John of Pernštejn did not keep Dědice for a long time, and with the consent of the bishop, he sold the farm and the listed accessories (including the desolate town of Hrádek) to John of Doubravka and Hradiště to be a bishop's estate. John of Pernštejn exchanged the farm for a Passau farm. In 1539, John of Doubravka had Dědice transferred to the Bishop of Olomouc, so that these estates became a bishop's estate.

The Augustinian Monastery of All Saints in Olomouc concluded a treaty with the bishop in 1590. The serfs from Dědice were to take beer from the Vyškov brewery for three years, and the monastery was to receive 1 pile of carp in return from the Vyškov ponds. Due to the fact that Dědice revolted against the monastery during the uprising, they lost their privileges.

In 1623, Caesar Nardus of Montepoli, a provost of the Augustinian monastery in Olomouc, restored privileges and escheat to Dědice; limited due to participation in the Bohemian Revolt. The reason for the restoration of privileges was the fear that the inhabitants might move out. Dědice was further freed from the statute labours, with the exception of eight statute labours, which would be specifically commanded to them.

In 1628, Cardinal Franz von Dietrichstein confirmed the privileges of Dědice and appointed statute labours. When the inhabitants of Dědice refused to harvest the manorial grain in 1653, several of them were imprisoned in the Vyškov chateau. After breaking the resistance on 1 August 1653, Dědice undertook to hold these statute labours.

Even the remaining statute labours, consisting of eight days of statute labours in the farmstead of Nezamyslice, were burdensome for the serfs of the monastery in Dědice. Therefore, at their request, in 1634, the provost Andreas Orlík of Lažisko changed them to a salary. In 1679, the privilege was restored by the provost George Karásek.

This part was sold by the monastery in 1683 for 7000 ducats. In 1684, the All Saints' Monastery in Olomouc transferred it to Jiří Protivec Žalkovský of Žalkovice, the owner of the Viceměřice farmstead. In 1732, George Fridrich, John and Milota Žalkovský transferred part of Dědice to Maria Elizabeth, Duchess of Schleswig-Holstein, born Princess of Liechtenstein (to the Kojetín estate). Since 1683, a large number of lords have taken over the ownership here (for example, the lords of Utting, the lords of Metternich and others). This part numbered 42 numbers and an inn.

The free farmstead in Dědice was held by Zdeněk Martinkovský of Rozseč († 1646) during the Thirty Years' War. In 1675 there was a free farmstead of Miniatti in Dědice.

The farmstead was in the episcopal part in 1750. In 1784, the farmstead was partitioned. According to the holders, the first part of Dědice was called episcopal or princely and the second monastery, Žalkovská or Vicoměřická. New statute labours were chosen by inhabitants of Dědice in 1777.

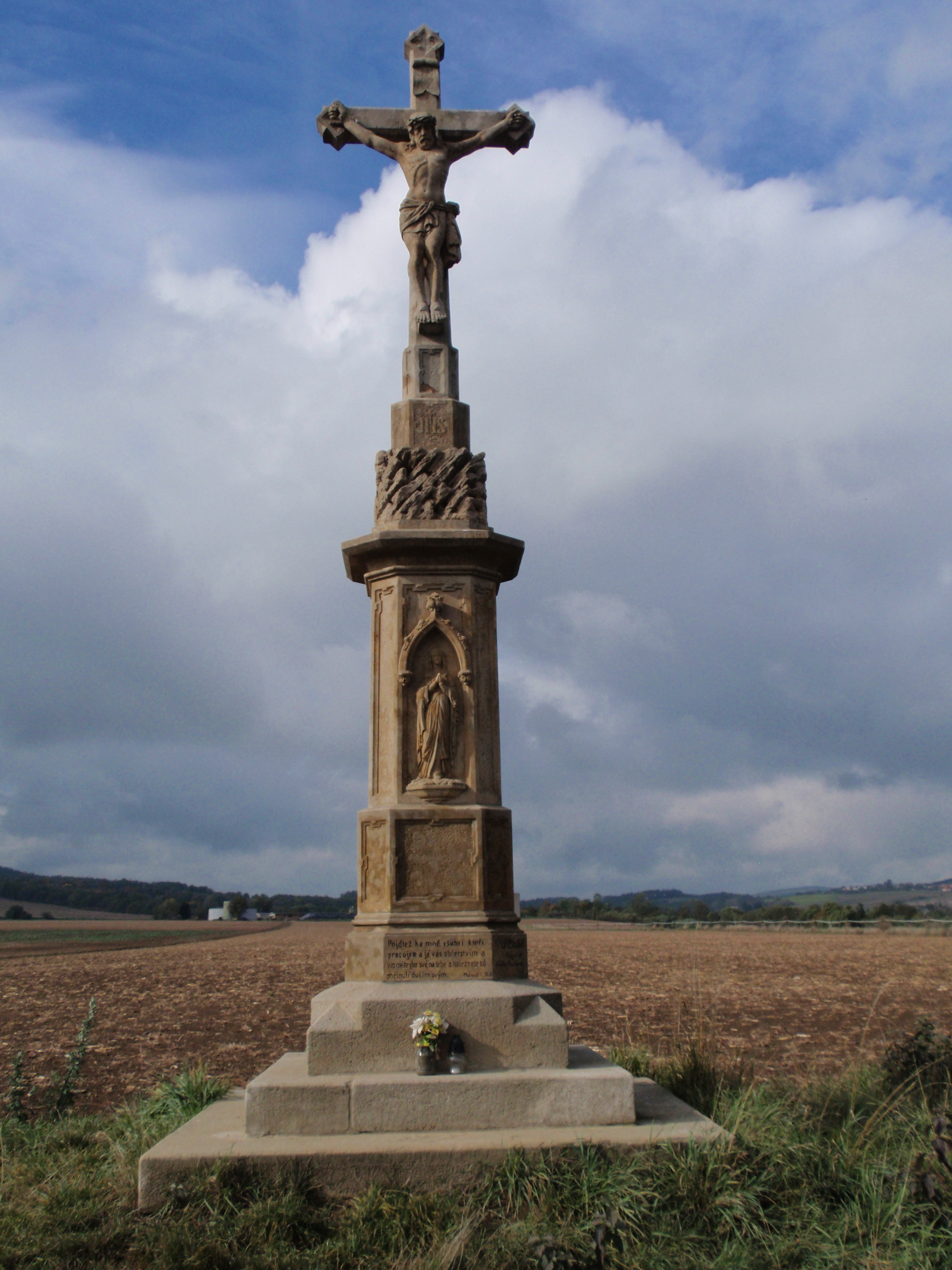
Statue of the crucified Christ

Wars had a great impact on the market town. In the 15th century, it was hit by the Hussite movement. An uprising and the Thirty Years' War followed. Dědice was particularly hard hit by the last phase of the Thirty Years' War, the so-called Swedish War. After the Thirty Years' War, the population dropped to just "17 neighbors and 14 widows." The war also brought enormous losses to the economy. Another constant threat was the Turks, who threatened the area. In the 18th century, Prussian troops marched during the Napoleonic Wars. At the beginning of December 1805, the local church was looted by French soldiers. After the Battle of Sadová in 1866, Prussian soldiers invaded Dědice again, chasing the defeated imperial army towards Vienna.

In addition to the wars, Dědice also experienced natural disasters in the form of hail storms, other times it was frosts with a lot of snow (in 1622 even in May). There were also severe droughts or floods, which then caused the main cause of crop failure and poverty. Other disasters included frequent and devastating fires and epidemics (plague, smallpox, cholera, or typhus). In 1830, 46 houses burned down in Dědice.

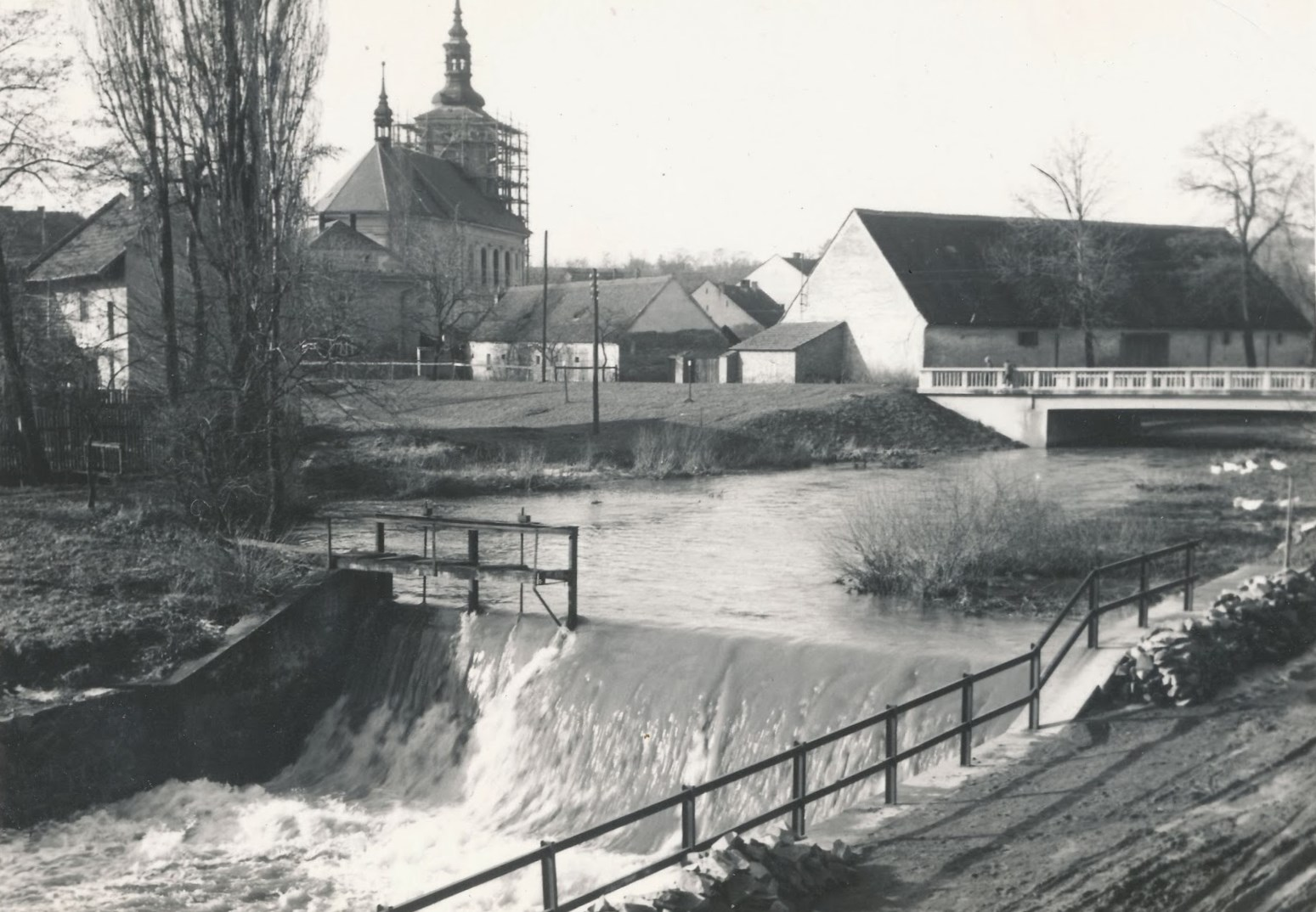
Repair of the church in Dědice (1967)

The rich past of Dědice is evidenced mainly by the local baroque church of the Holy Trinity, built in 1753 on the site of an older Gothic church from the 14th century, which was destroyed in a large fire. The oldest bell of the church of Dědice, which was cast by Vyškov bell-maker Filip Konwarz, dates from 1556. The temple was almost destroyed in 1731 after lightning struck it and set it on fire. At that time, the parishioners, together with the then pastor P. Karel Leopold Felix (1727–1750), immediately began repairs and raised the tower, which has been preserved. In 1750, the tower was demolished because the parishioners decided to build a completely new church.

Felix's successor, P. Jan Antonín Grosspeter, began to implement the intended plan. Construction began on 6 March 1752, and was completed without interior decoration and any equipment a year later, in 1753. The new Baroque church was solemnly consecrated on 18 June 1780, by the first Archbishop of Olomouc, Antonín Theodor Colloredo (1777–1811).

The greatest effort to flourish the parish of Dědice and school can be seen in the 18th century. A newly built church was consecrated here and a new school was built, which soon burned down. Its restoration was not arranged until 1799 by Count Althan. Until 1919, Dědice had its own spiritual administration. The advantage was the position near Vyškov, the nobility bought houses and farms in Dědice.

=== 20th century ===
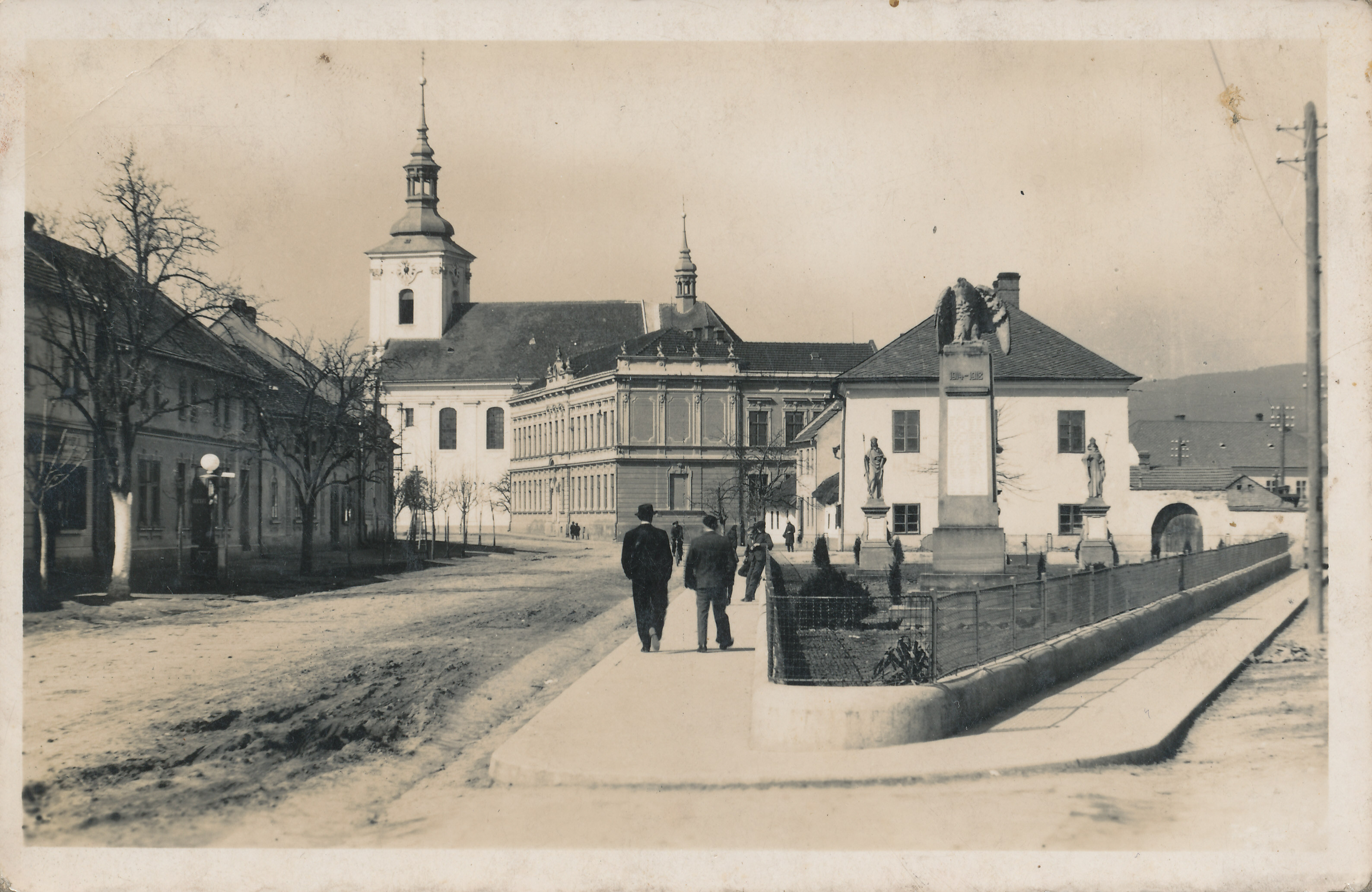
The square in front of the town hall with statues of saints and a monument to the victims of the World War I

After the World War I, there were a total of 439 houses in Dědice in 1921 (315 in Dědice, 80 in Hamiltony, 44 in Pazderna) and 2529 inhabitants (1843 in Dědice, 478 in Hamiltony, 208 in Pazderna), according to the results of the first census of people in the Czechoslovak Republic published in 1924. Dědice covered an area of 18,9 km2 (1890 ha).

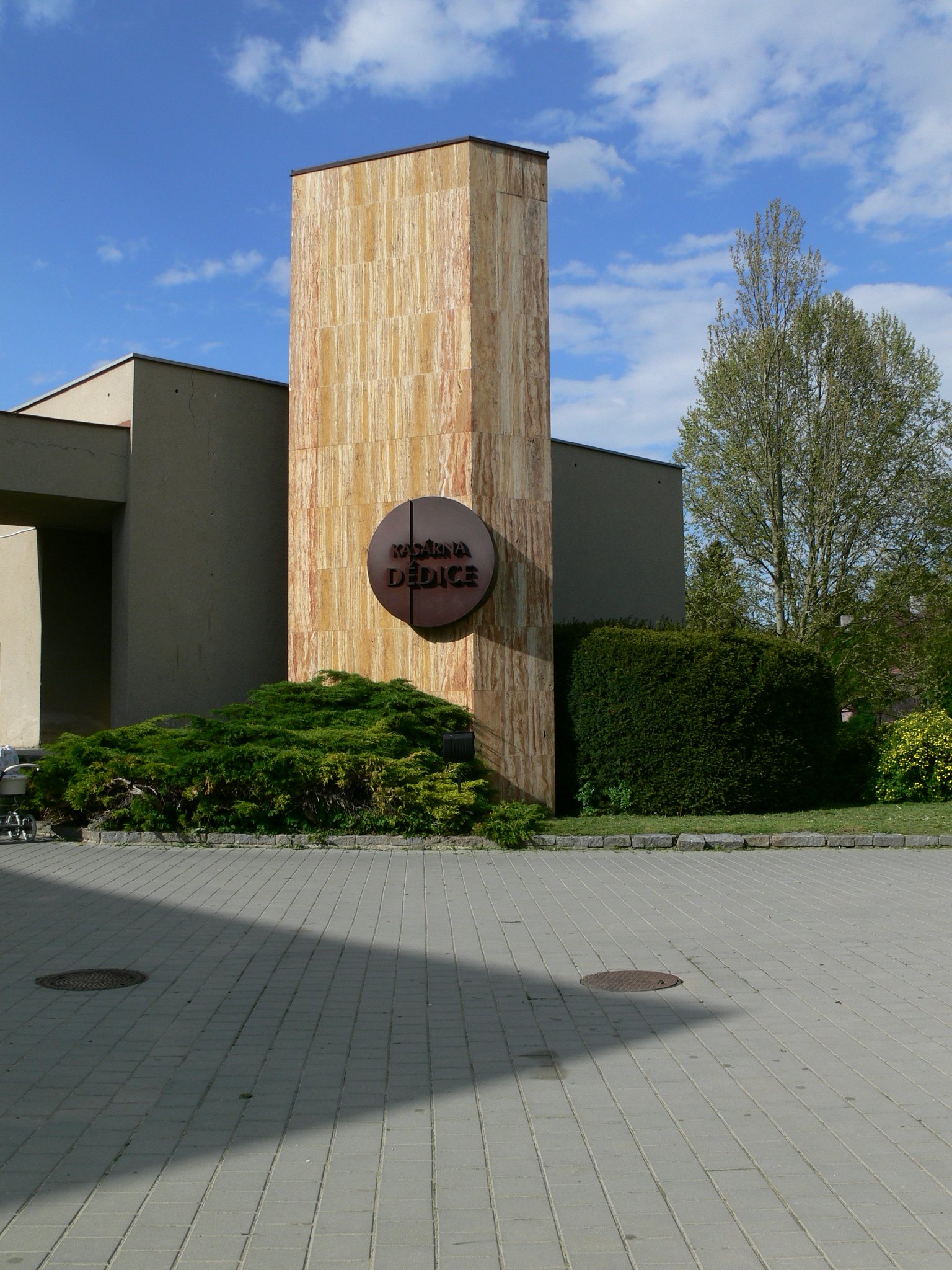
Barracks Dědice

At the end of the World War II, heavy fighting struck the Vyškov region.

Map of Vyškov after the unification with the surrounding municipalities: part of cadastral area of Dědice in the north in the upper half of the map (a smaller part remains off the map) and cadastral areas of Brňany, Křečkovice, Nosálovice, Vyškov město and Vyškov suburb mostly in the lower half of the map

==== Amalgamation of Dědice and Vyškov ====
Before the merger with Vyškov in 1941, Dědice had the legal title of town. Dědice consisted of the settlements of Dědice, Hamiltony (pilgrimage site) and Pazderna. In 1941, on the basis of a decree of the district governor (V-2677 / 3-1941 + No. 47/1942 UL), Dědice became a settlement of Vyškov. The municipality of Dědice was abolished and Dědice and Vyškov were merged into Vyškov. Historical lexicon of towns and cities. The development of the position and function of town settlements in the history of the territorial division of the Czech lands from 1850 to the present of Štěpán Mleziva and Karel Kuča states that after the war a separation was carried out when the municipality of Vyškov was parted in the municipalities of Brňany, Dědice, Křečkovice, Nosálovice, Vyškov in 1945. In 1949, these municipalities were to be reunited (No. 249/1949 U2; U2 = Official Gazette II (1945–1951)). The municipality of Dědice was abolished and Dědice, together with Brňany, Křečkovice, Nosálovice and Vyškov, again became the settlement of Vyškov. On the other hand, period documents show that after 1945 Dědice and other municipalities did not become independent again after their annexation to Vyškov in 1941 and 1942, respectively. Following the decree of the District Committee of Vyškov of 26 October 1945, and after the Provincial Committee in Brno also spoke in favor of the interim joint administration of the merged municipalities in December, the Vyškov local committee continued to manage Dědice's affairs. By a decree of 7 February 1946, the Ministry of the Interior ordered the joint administration of Vyškov, Brňany, Dědice, Křečkovice and Nosálovice. On this basis, the Vyškov local committee was supplemented in March 1946 by representatives of Dědice.

For the rest of the year, the citizens of Dědice nevertheless sought to reverse the decision of the ministry and did not hesitate to turn to Klement Gottwald in this matter. The result of their efforts was at least that a branch of the Vyškov local committee was established in Dědice in 1946. A major turning point occurred at the beginning of 1947, when the District Committee of Vyškov decree announced that, according to the Provincial Committee in Brno, the "joint administration of the municipalities of Vyškov, Brňany, Dědice, Křečkovice and Nosálovice", established by a decree of the Ministry of the Interior of 7 February 1946 no. B-8111-28 / 1-1946-II / 2 according to § 27 of Decree no. 121/45 Coll., expired on 17 February 1947. As a result, it is necessary to activate their own administration in the named municipalities, i.e. to set up local National Committees in individual municipalities according to the results of the elections to the National Constituent Assembly."

Vyškov had to take note of this decision, and due to the composition of national committees based on election results, election committees were formed in which two members were appointed by each party. After the mandates were recalculated, the inaugural meetings of the new local committees met. The meeting of the local committee in Dědice took place on 10 August 1947.

According to the opinion of the District Committee of Vyškov, the task of the newly established local committees was to verify, among other things, whether these municipalities want to reunite with Vyškov or remain independent. In September 1947, they voted for the merger only in Nosálovice, but the Local Committee of Vyškov insisted that all municipalities be reunited. However, apart from Nosálovice, other local committees did not agree to the merger. In the territory of Vyškov, there were more or less formally five local committees (local committees outside the local committee in Vyškov actually had no authority, as there was no division of financial management), which lasted until the beginning of 1948. On 19 January 1948 it was decided to hand over the administration to the local committees of individual municipalities, even "de facto". This was to take place on 23 February 1948. The only thing missing was the approval of the Provincial Committee in Brno. District Committee of Vyškov, before it was granted, convened a representative of the local committees on 19 February and then issued an acreage on 21 February, deciding that Vyškov should be administered by a joint local committee by the end of March 1948. Until then, the Provincial Committee in Brno was expected to issue an opinion on the merger or separation of municipalities. The Provincial Committee in Brno issued an instruction on the basis of which the District Committee of Vyškov held a meeting on 25 February, which was attended by representatives of the provincial committee, the district committee and the local committees Vyškov and Dědice.

The inhabitants of Dědice were the most active in the question of their independence, when they urgently urged the solution at the Provincial Committee in Brno. The arguments for merging the municipalities into one unit were presented at the meeting by Jaroslav Sedlák, a member of the county of the provincial committee. The case was then formally concluded by a decision of the Provincial Committee in Brno of 9 March 1948 on the merger of neighboring municipalities with Vyškov, which was justified by the "urgent public interest". The situation was thus clarified and the municipalities were not separated from Vyškov. However, Dědice in particular did not intend to accept this situation, and at the end of January 1949 their message set out for Prague to the office of the President of the Czechoslovak Republic. There they protested against the amalgamation with Vyškov. The mission was unsuccessful, so Dědice (together with representatives of Brňany) appealed to the Ministry of the Interior against the decision of the provincial committee of 9 March 1948 on the amalgamation of municipalities. But they didn't succeed there either.

By its decree of 14 September 1949, the District Committee of Vyškov was finally able to state that "... the quoted decision of the former provincial committee in Brno on the merger of the municipalities of Vyškov, Dědice, Brňany, Křečkovice and Nosálovice came into force.". Since 1950, Dědice has been part of Vyškov in the Vyškov district.

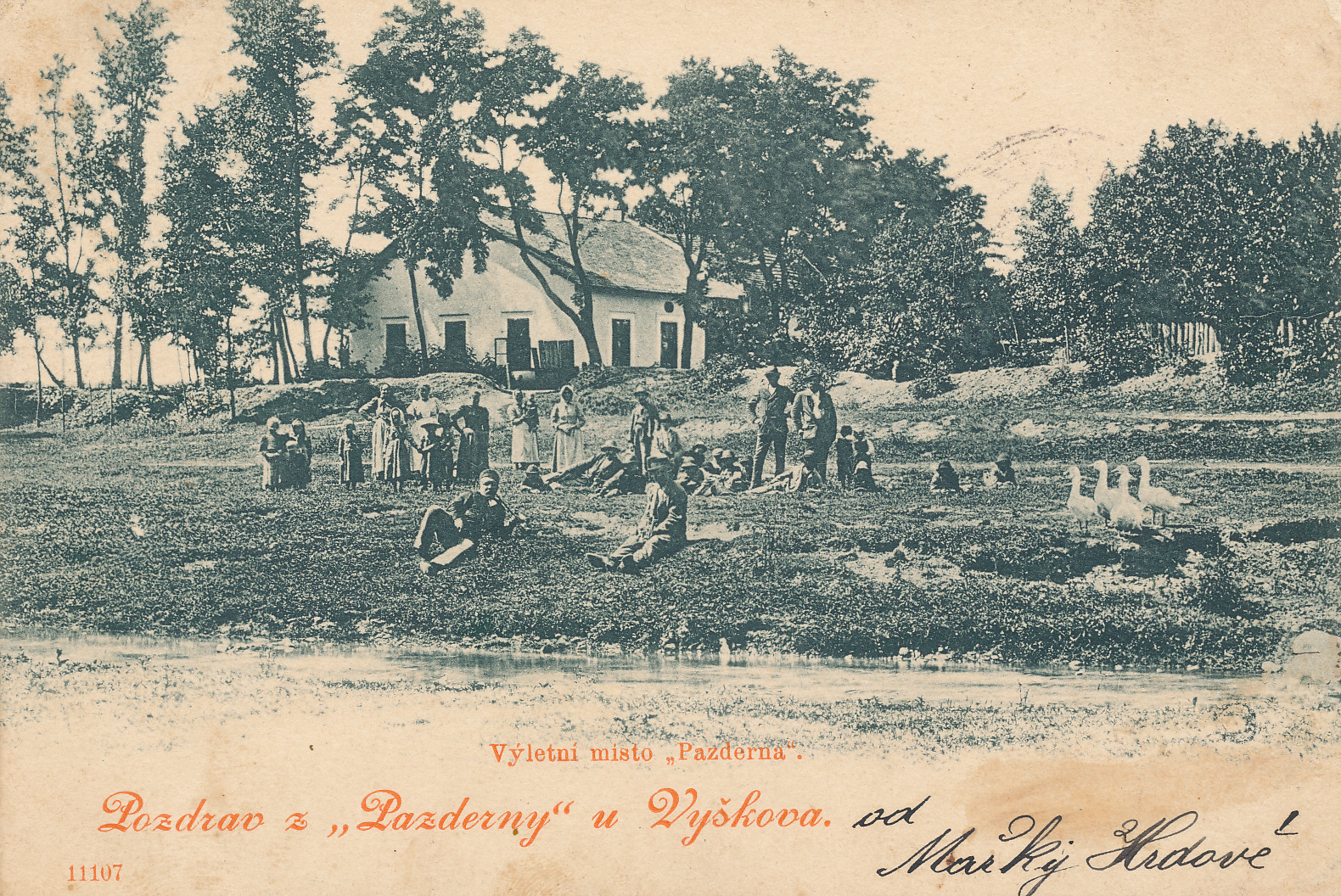
Settlement of Dědice: Pazderna, 1900

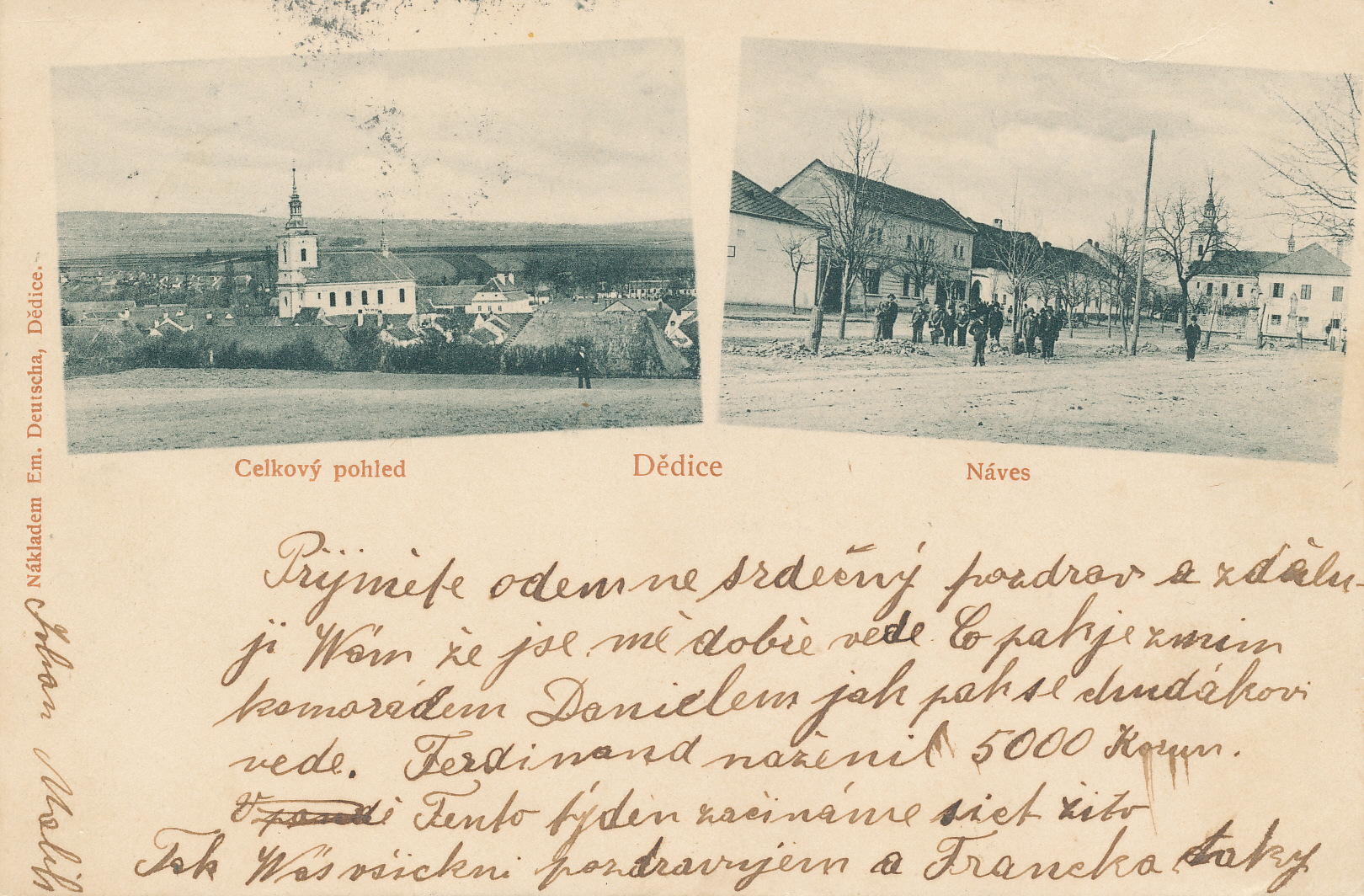
Early 20th century

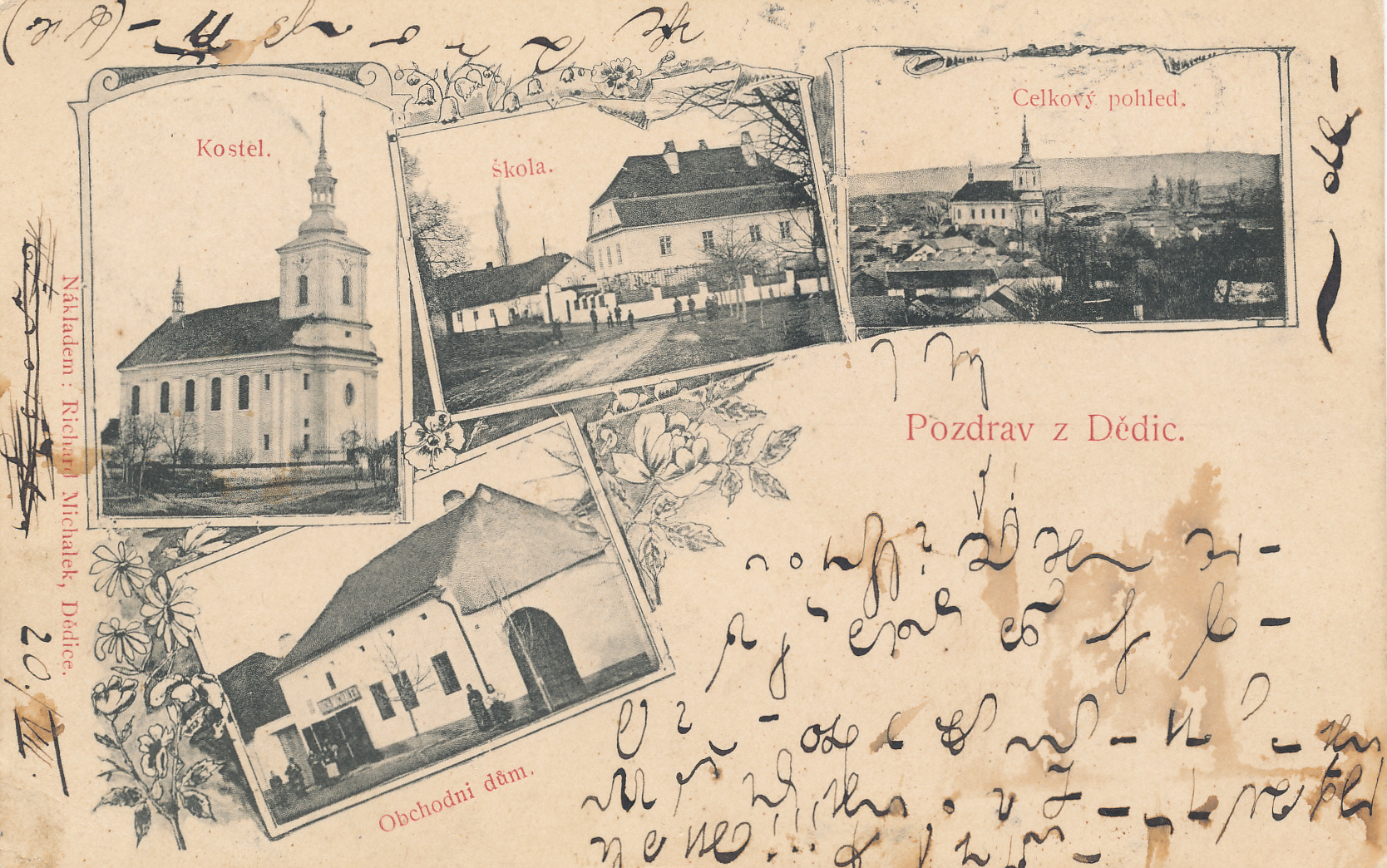
1910s

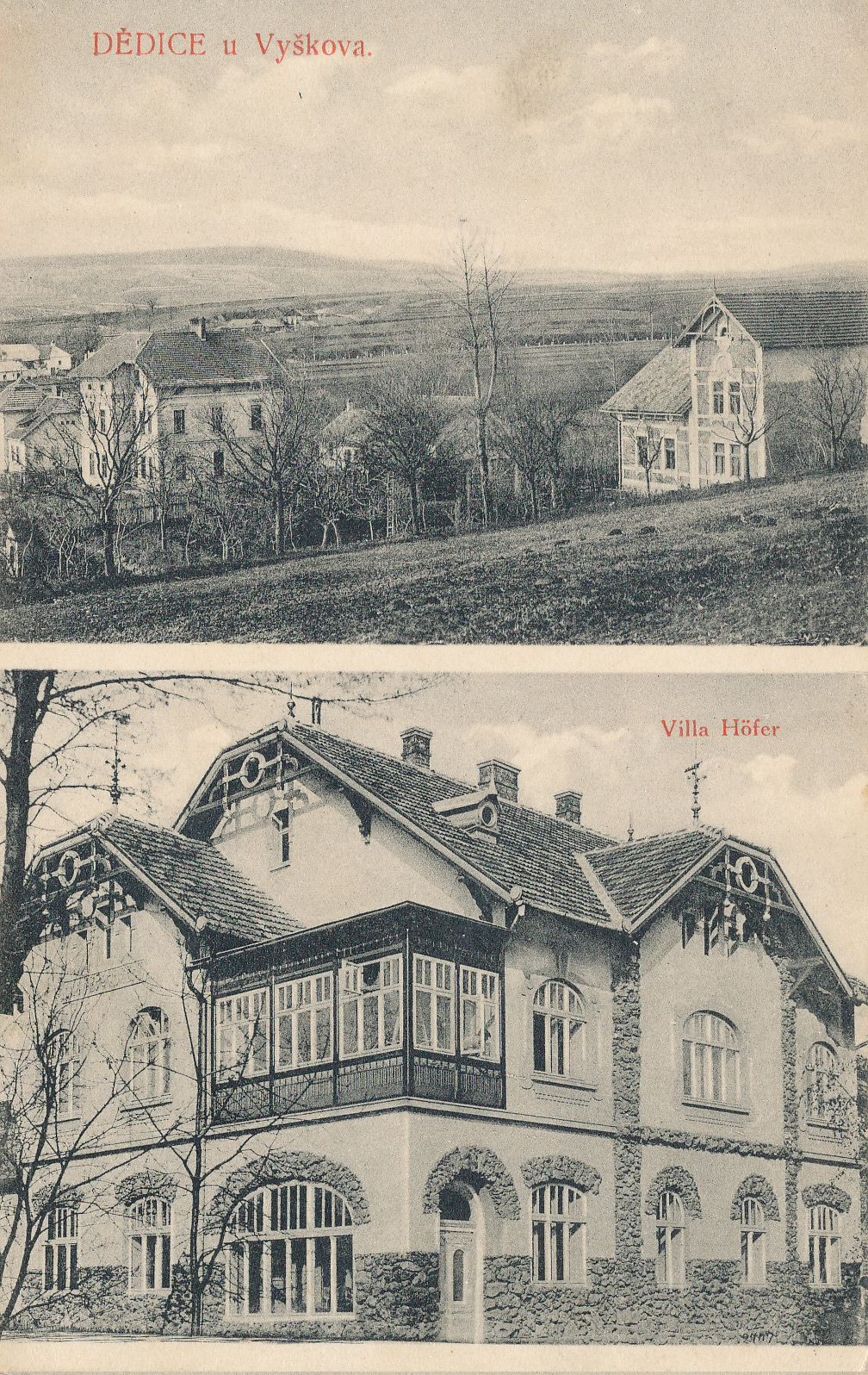
First half of the 1910s. Höfer's villa

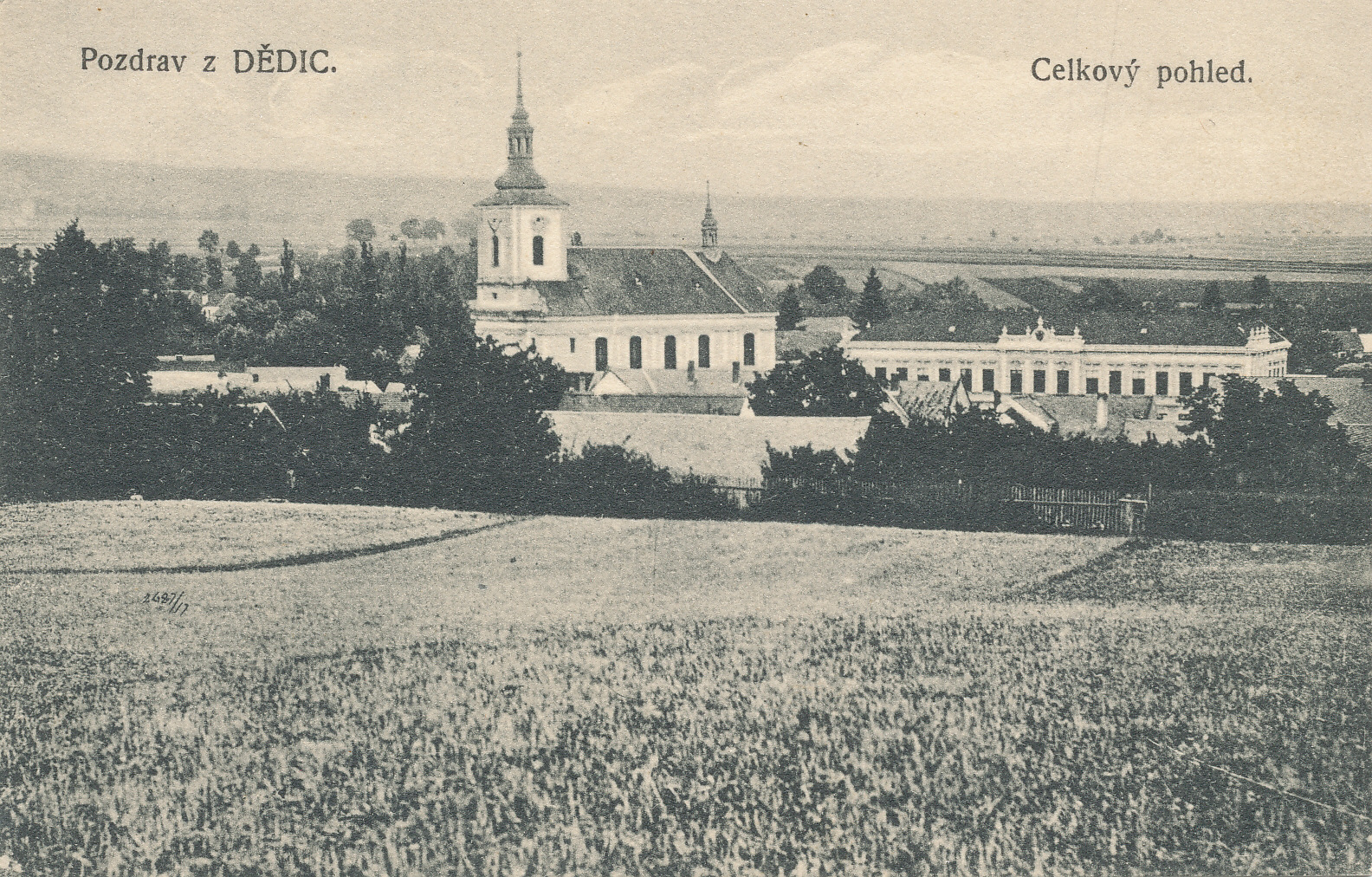
Dědice, 1910s to 1920s

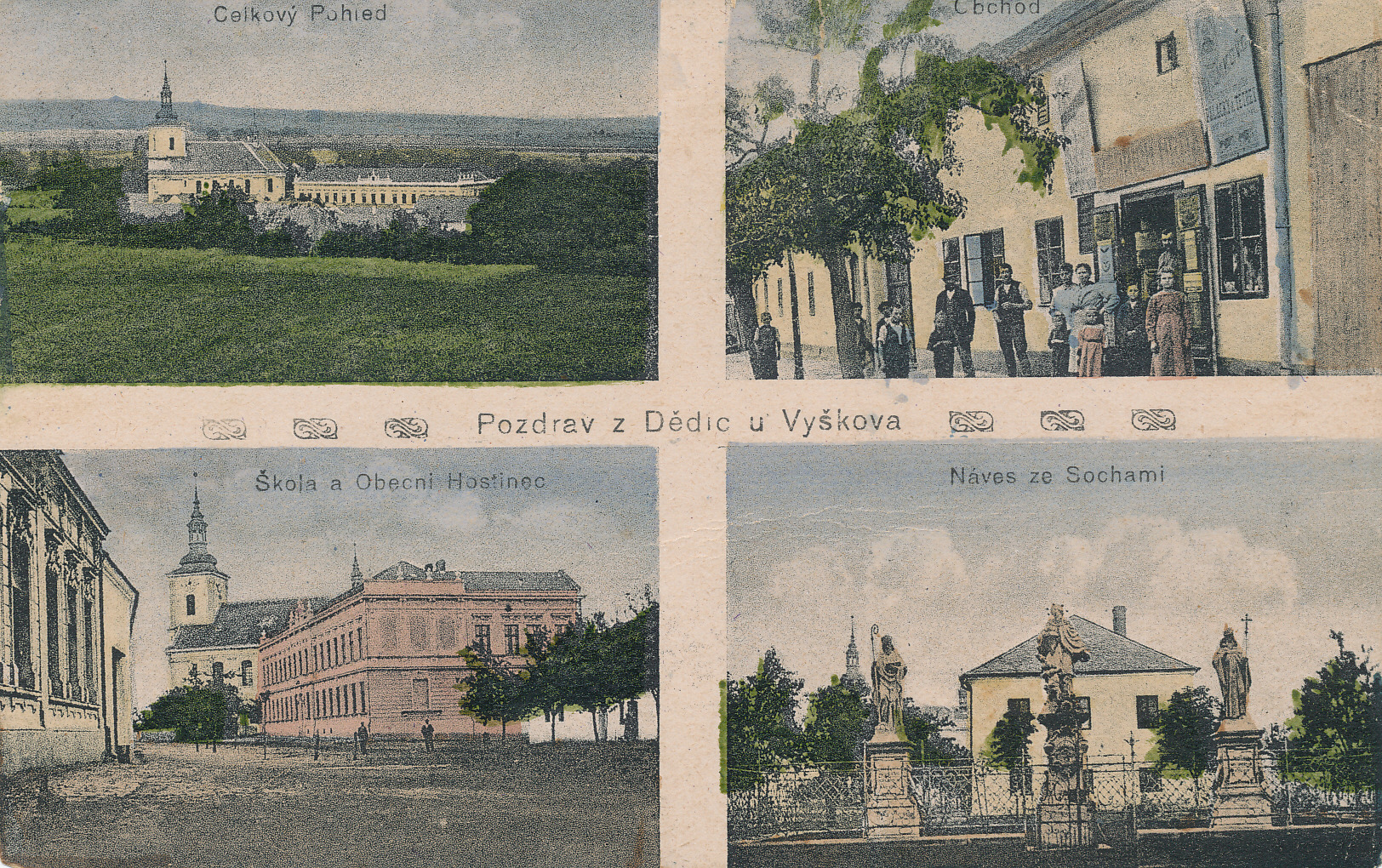
Dědice, 1920s

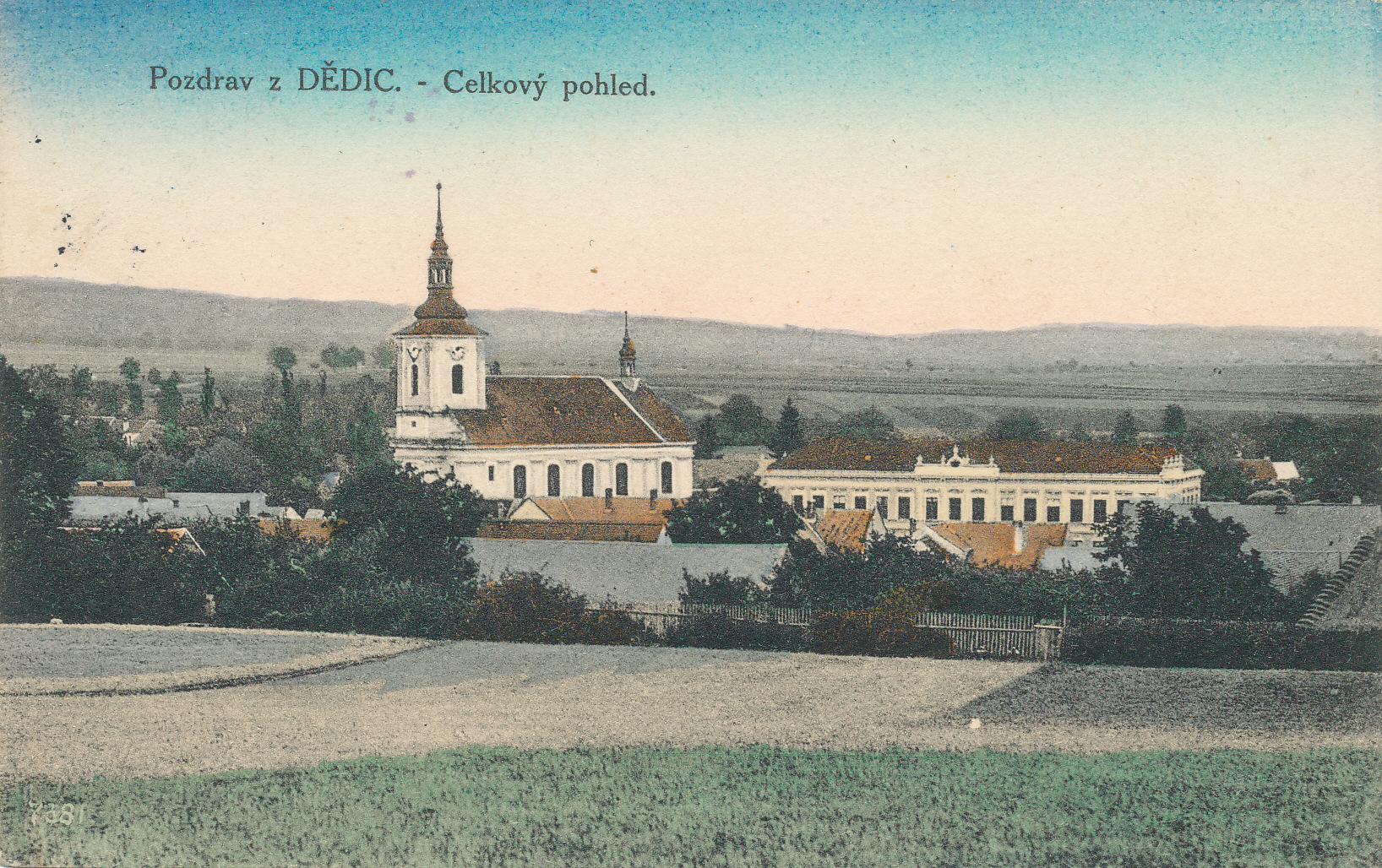
Dědice, 1920s

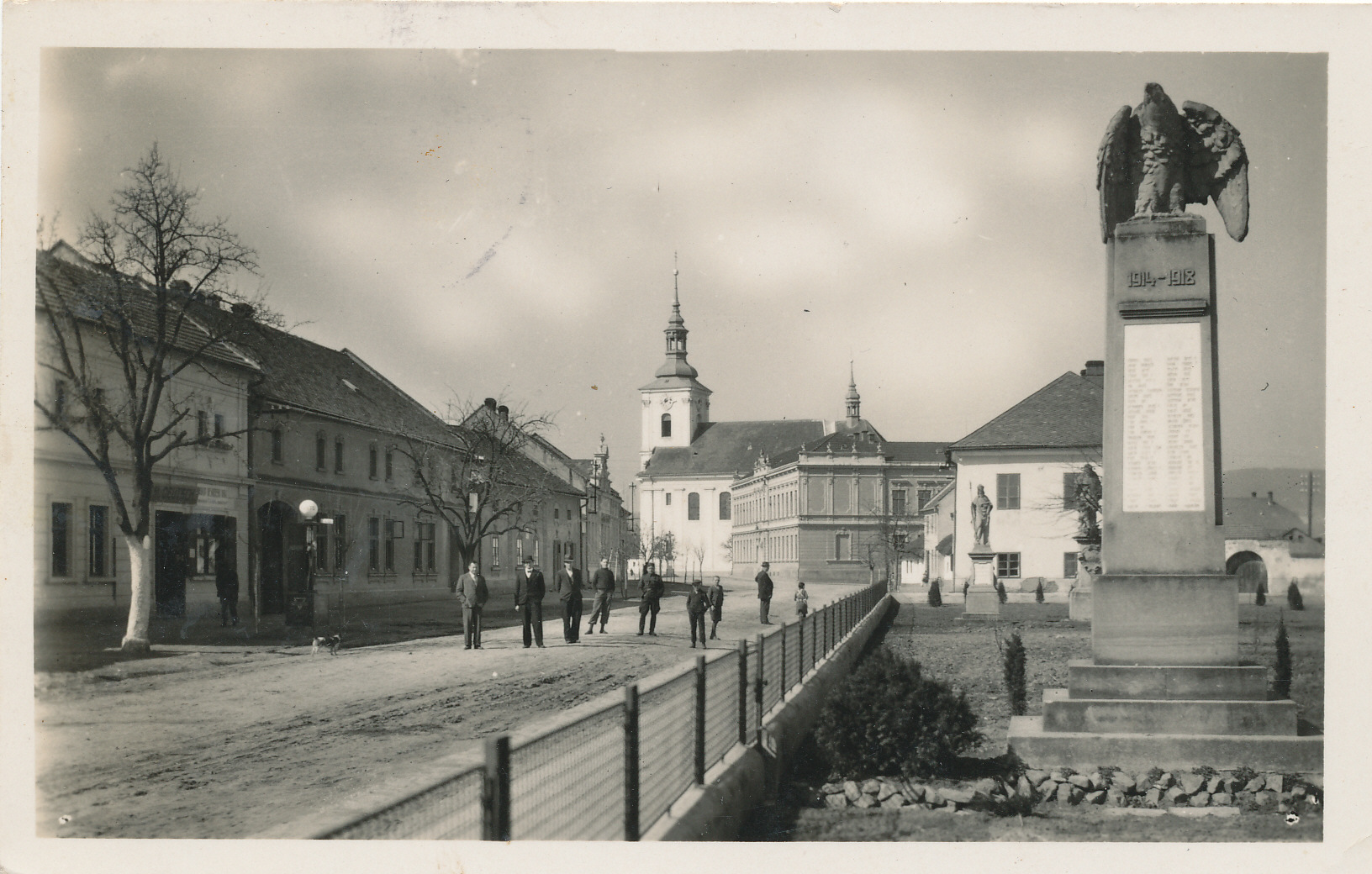
Dědice, 2nd half of the 1930s

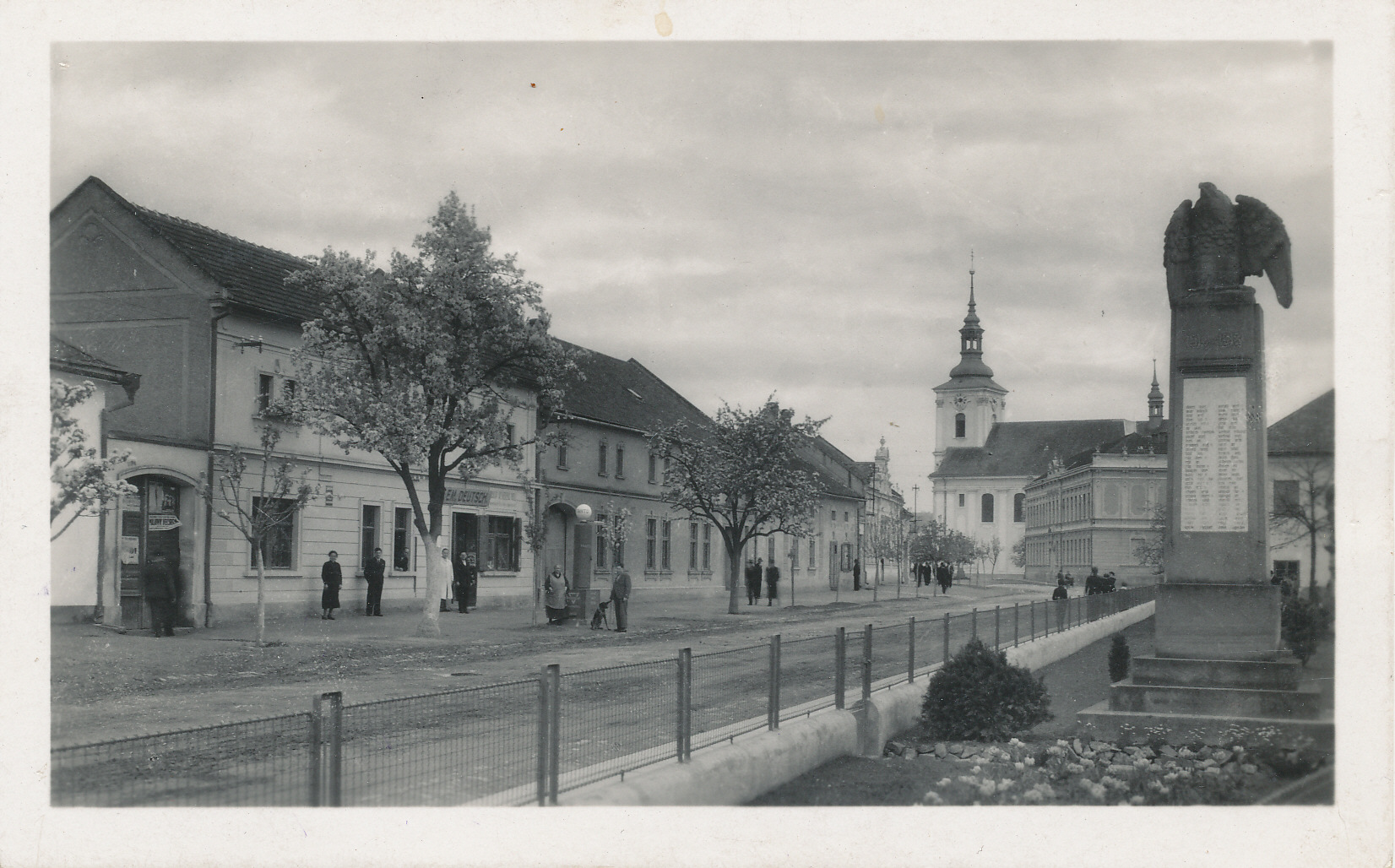
First half of the 1940s

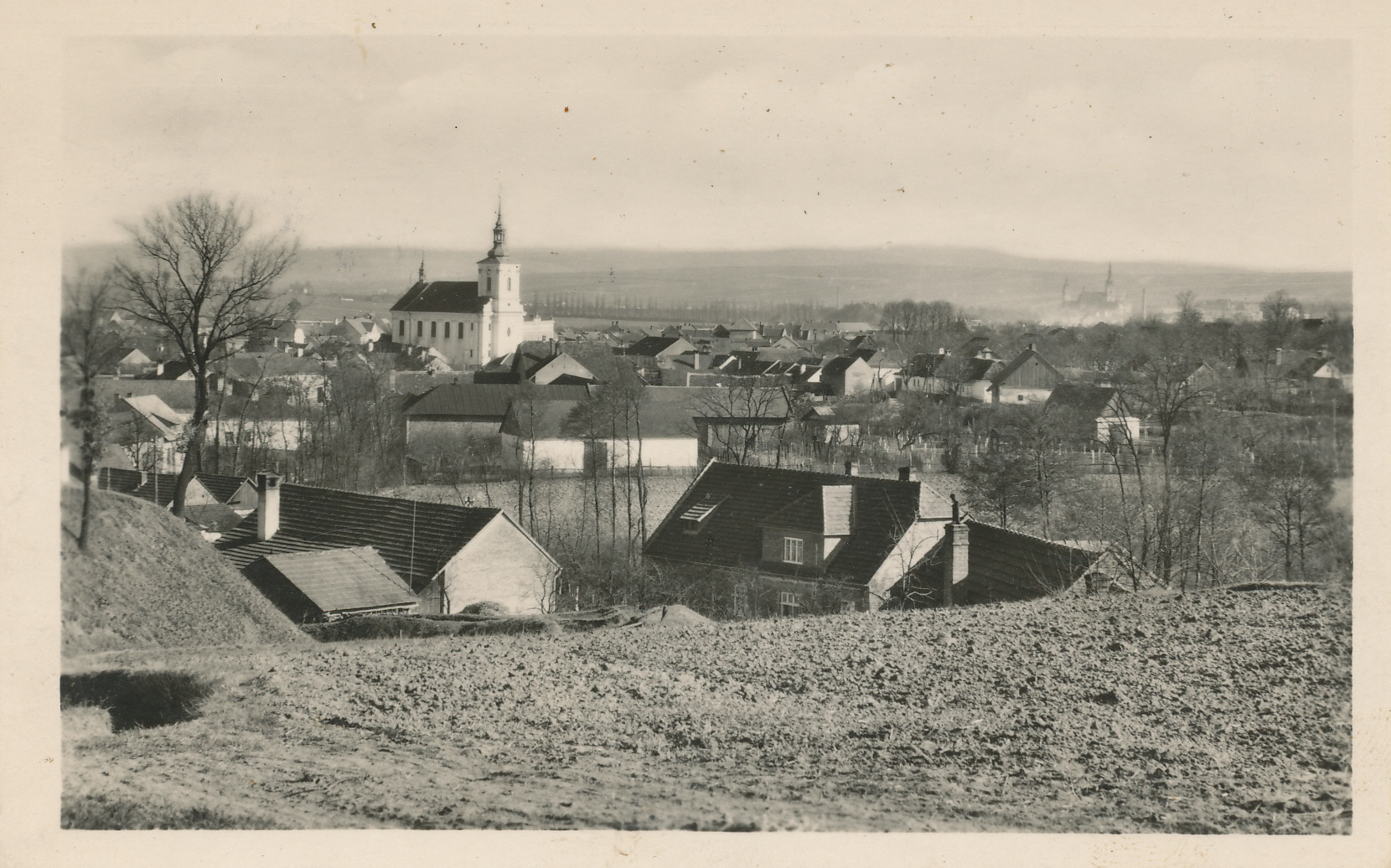
Second half of the 1940s.

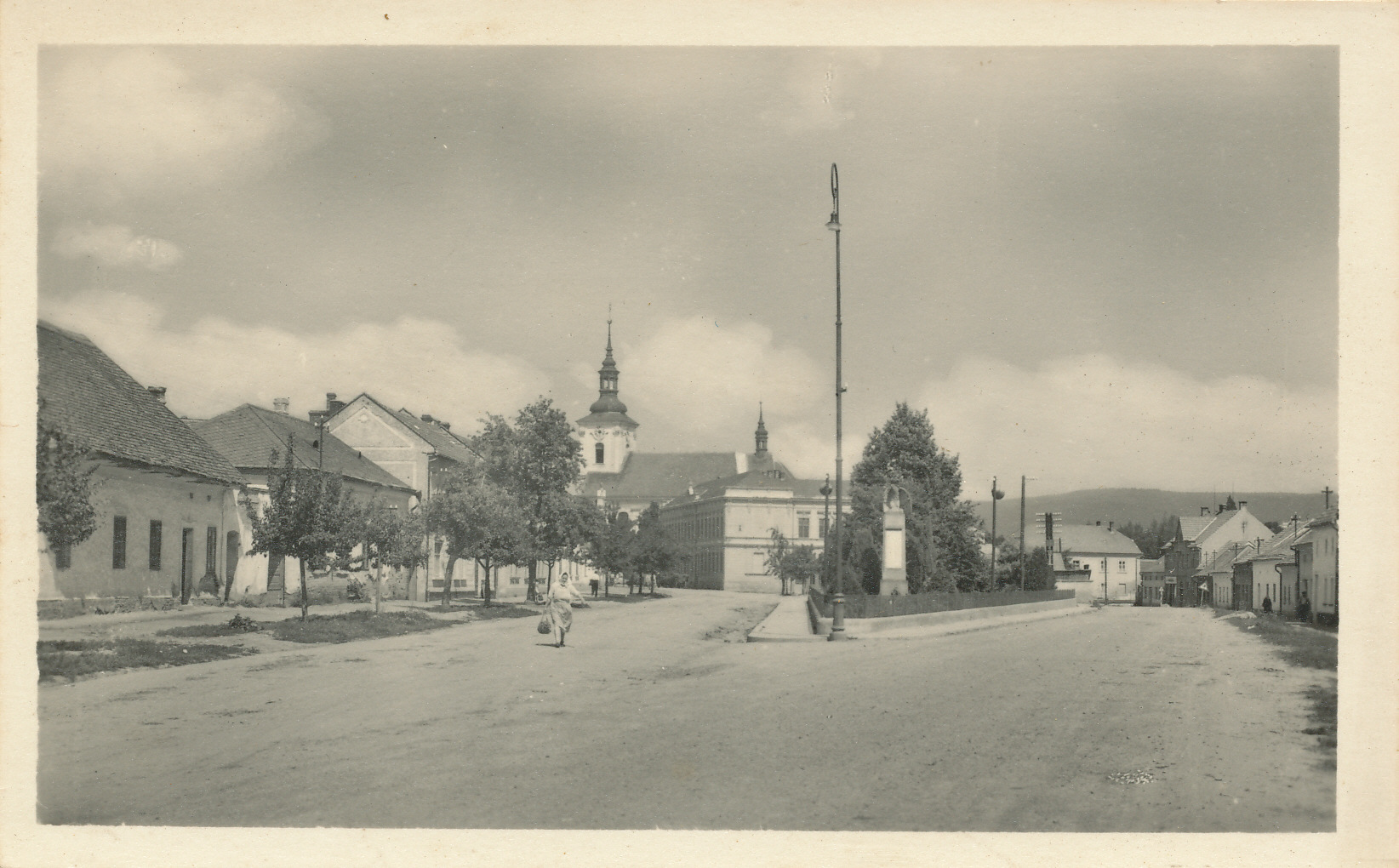
Square in Dědice, late 1940s or early 1950s.

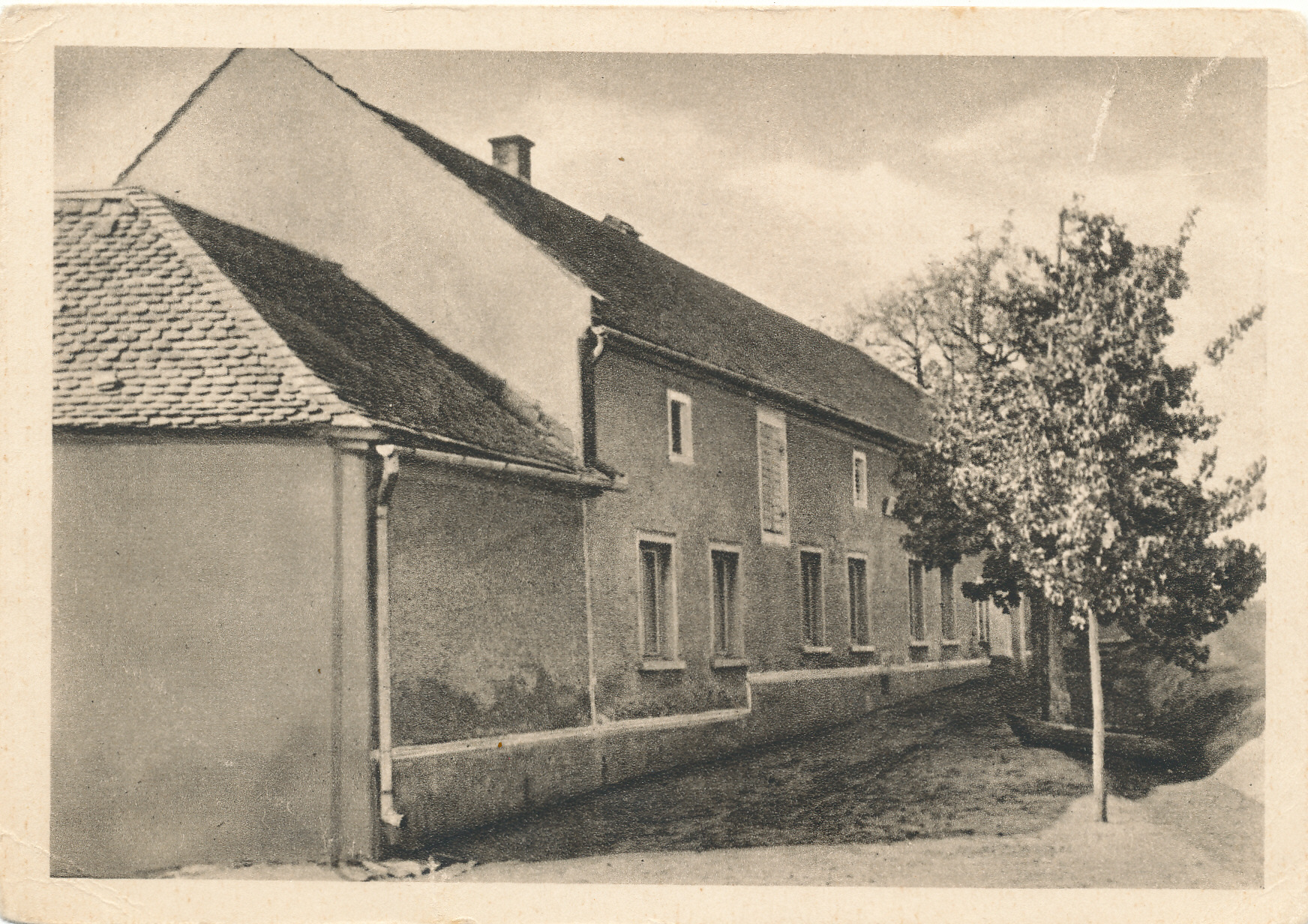
The so-called The birth house of Klement Gottwald in Dědice on Haná in the condition before reconstruction. 2nd half of the 1940s / early 1950s.

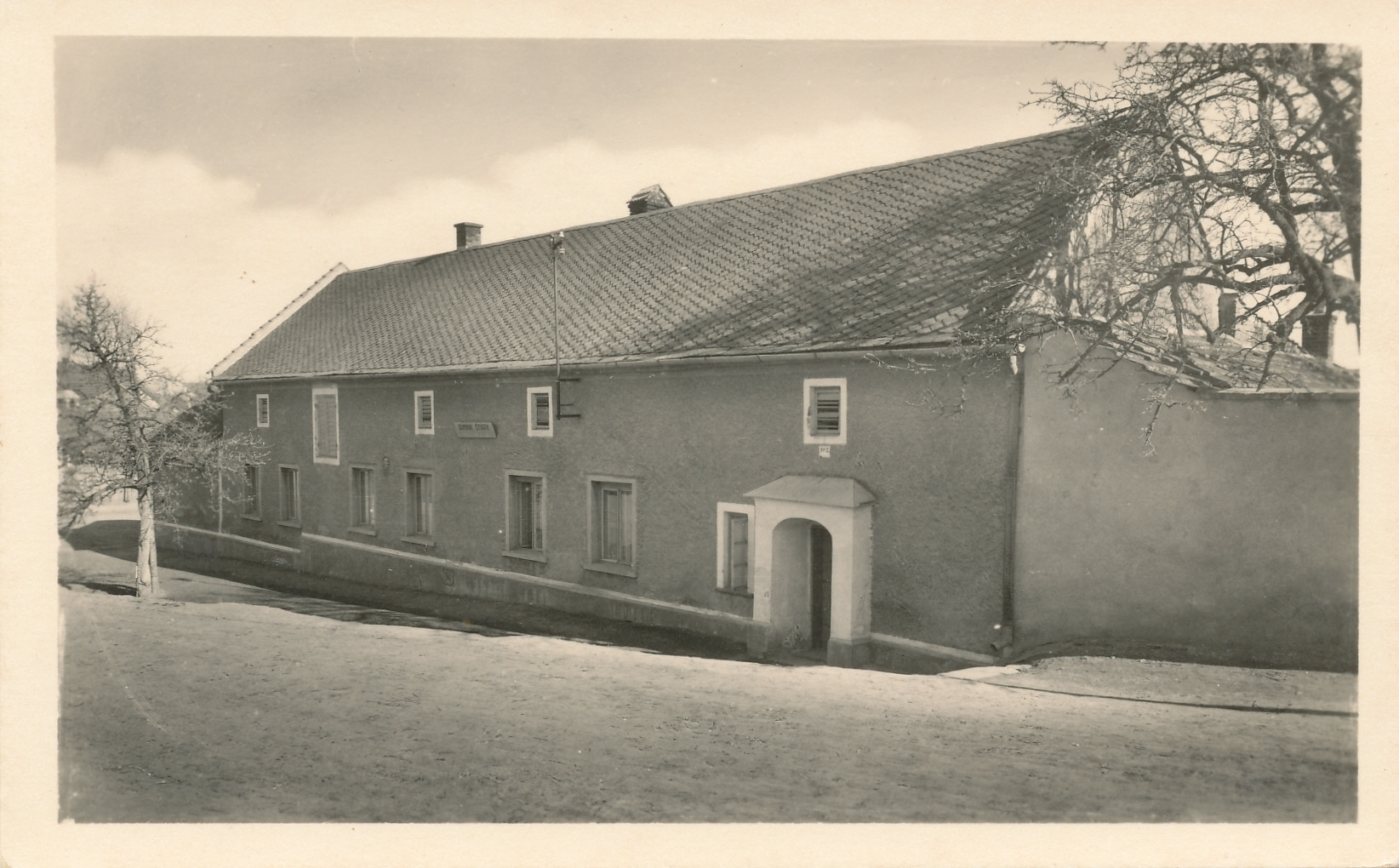
The so-called Klement Gottwald's birth house before reconstruction started in 1954

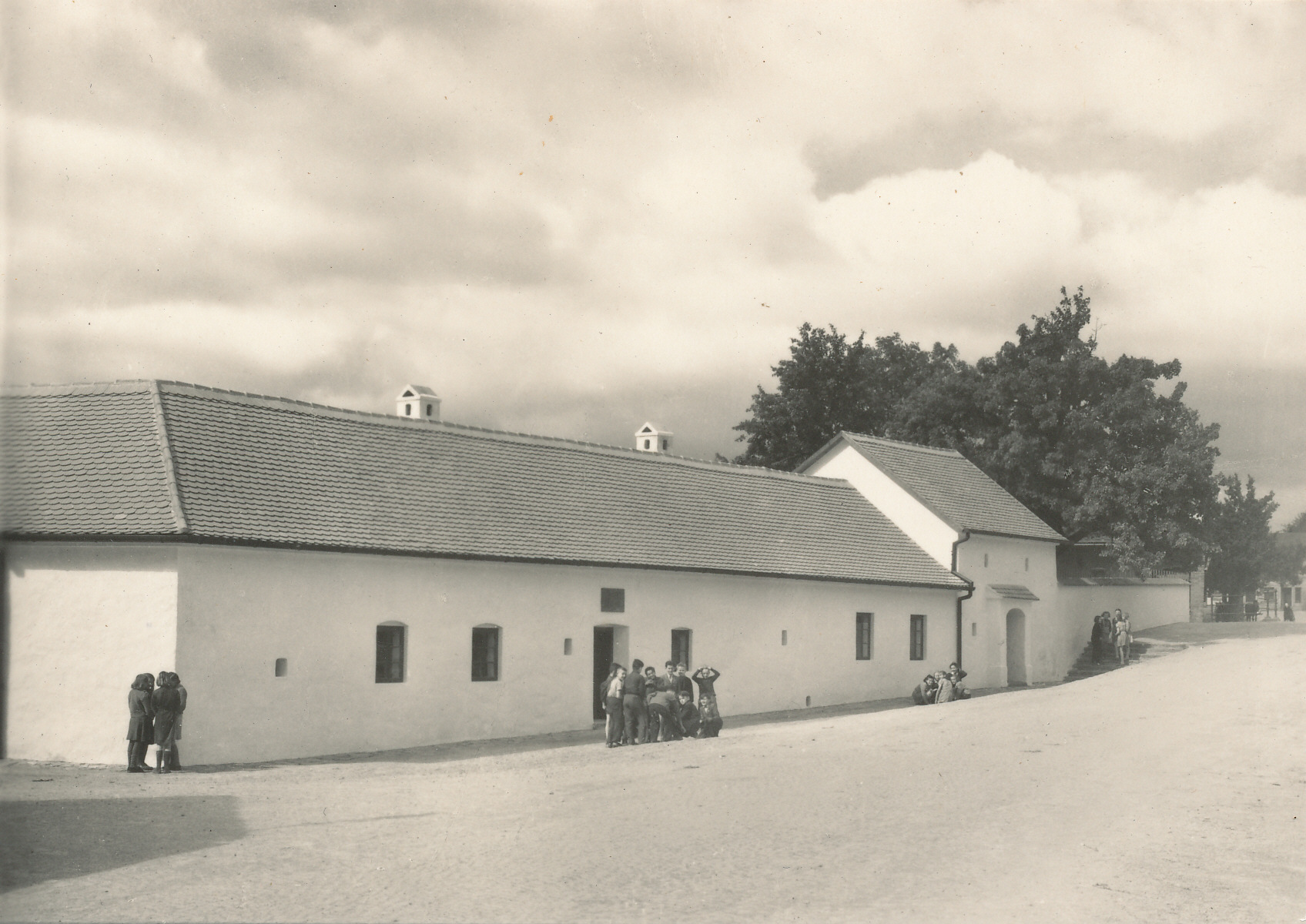
The so-called Klement Gottwald's birthplace after reconstruction, second half of the 1950s

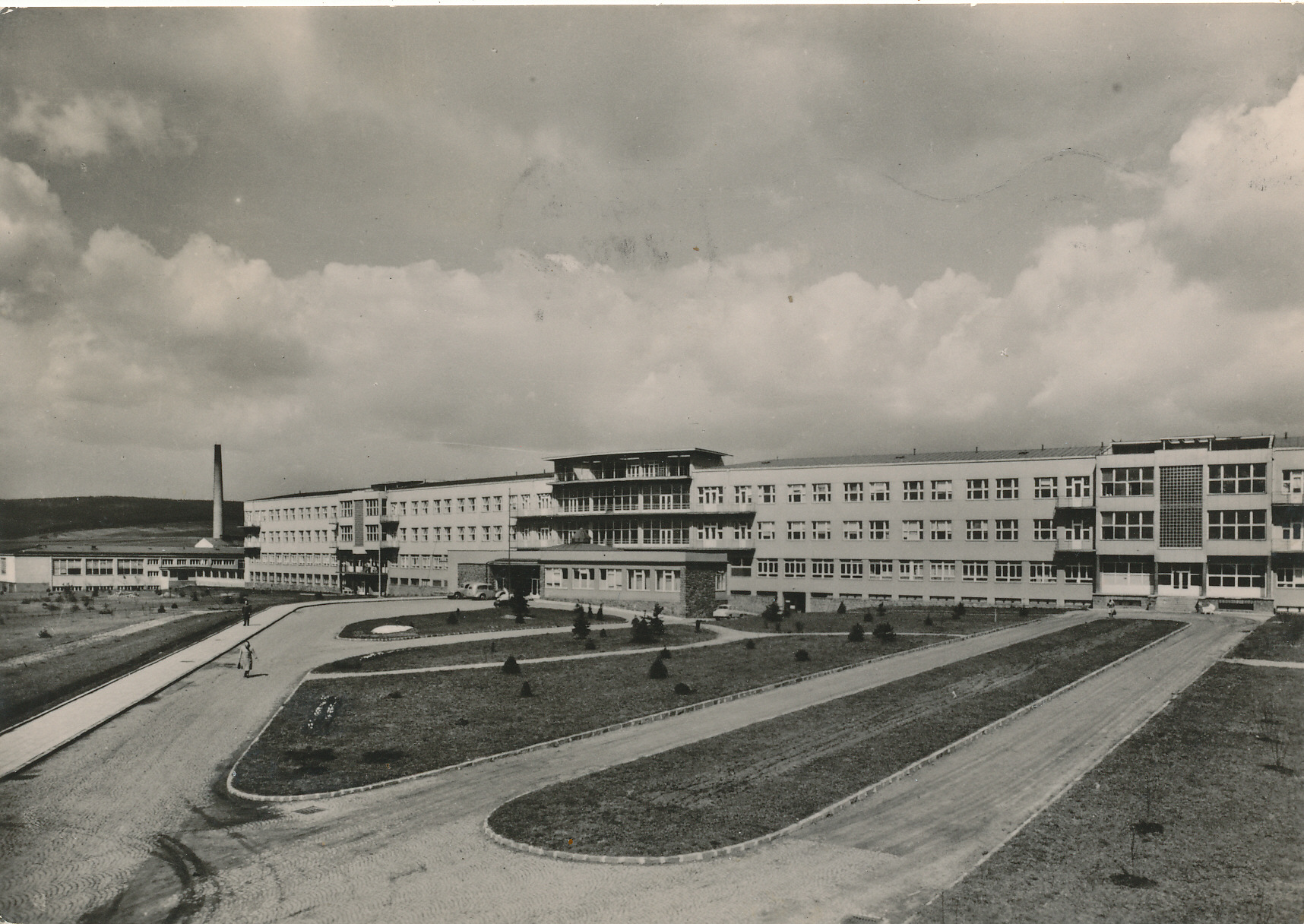
Vyškov Hospital in Dědice, early 1960s

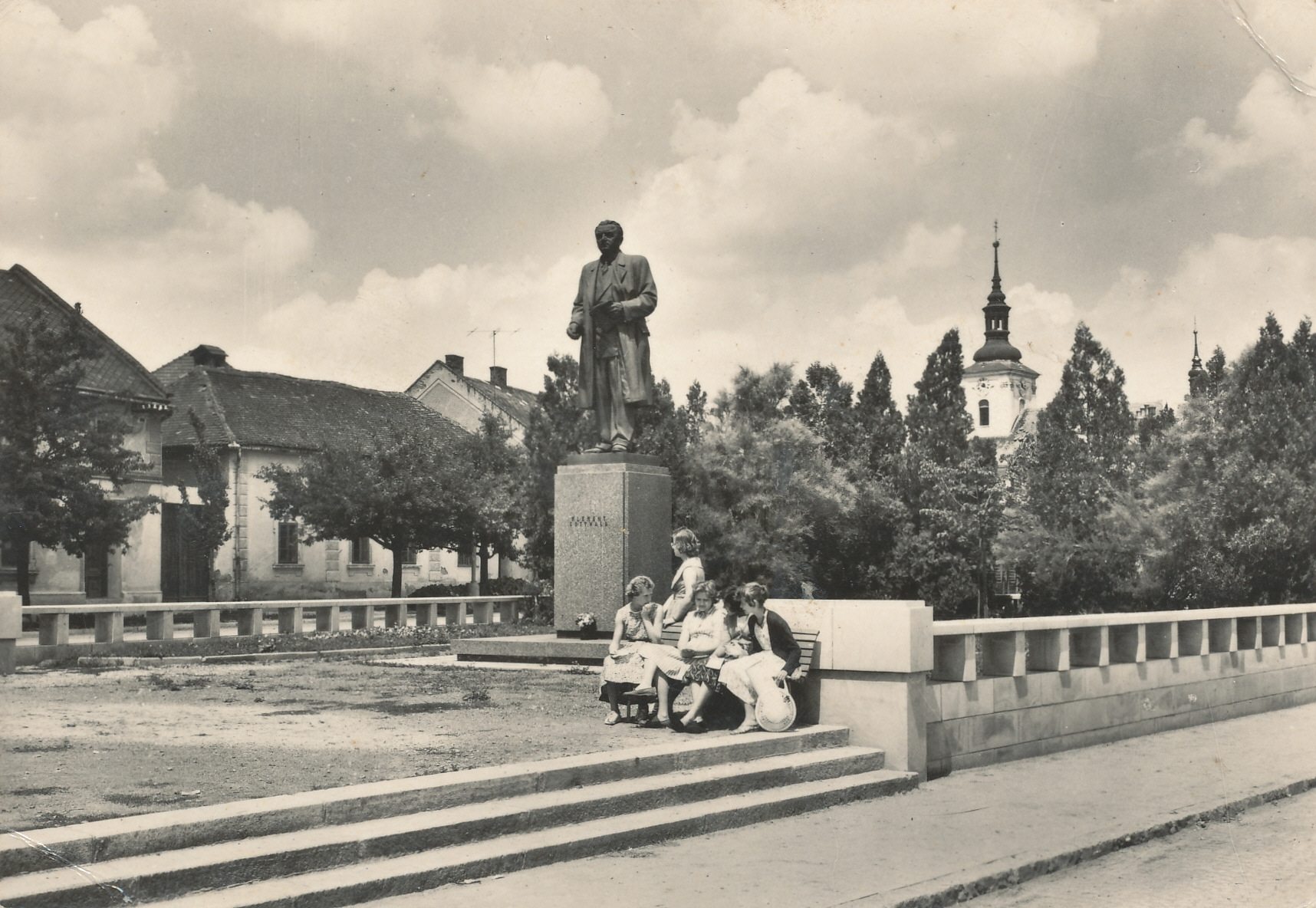
Monument to Klement Gottwald on Svobody Square, early 1960s

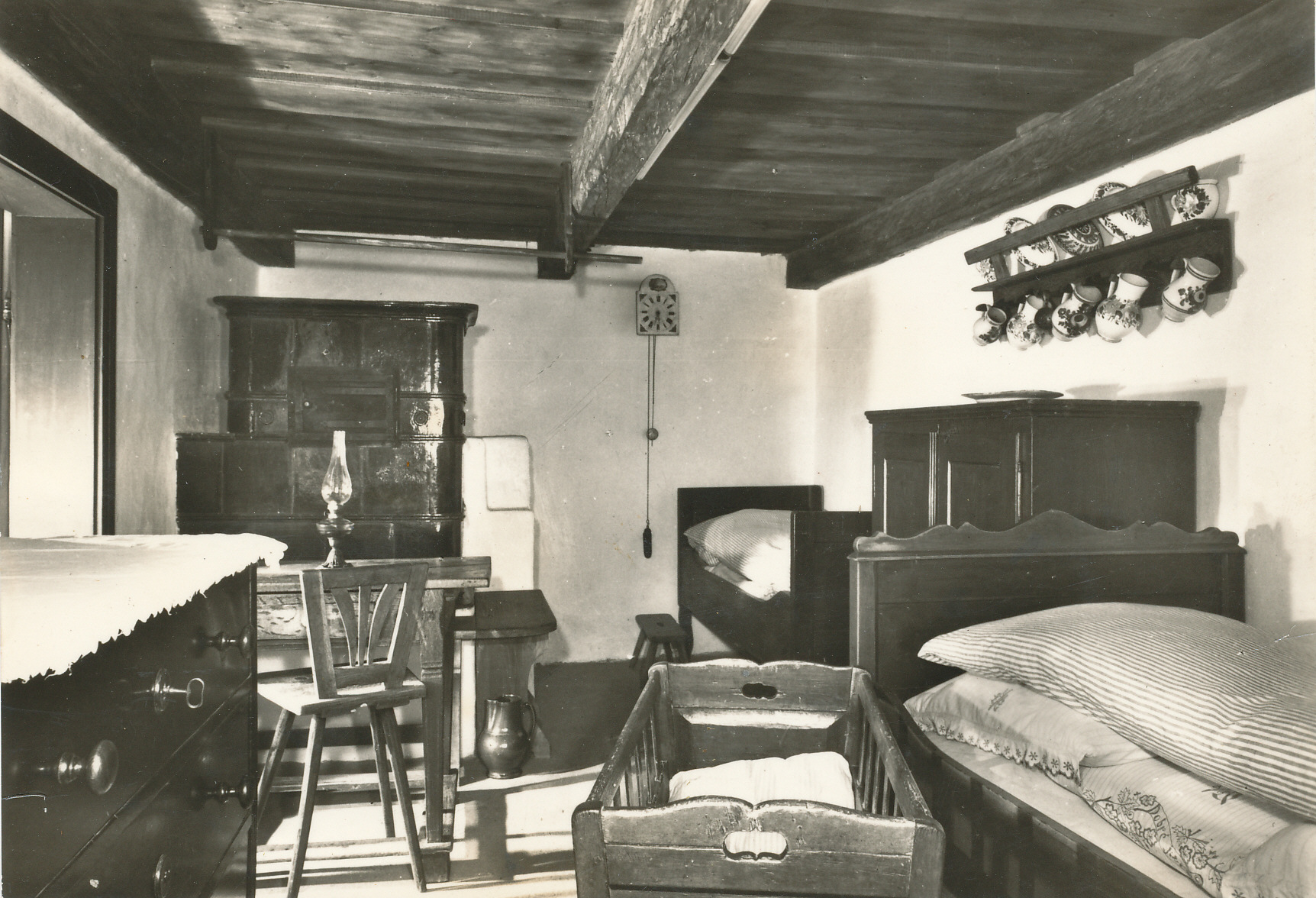
Klement Gottwald Memorial - native room, 1950s or 1960s

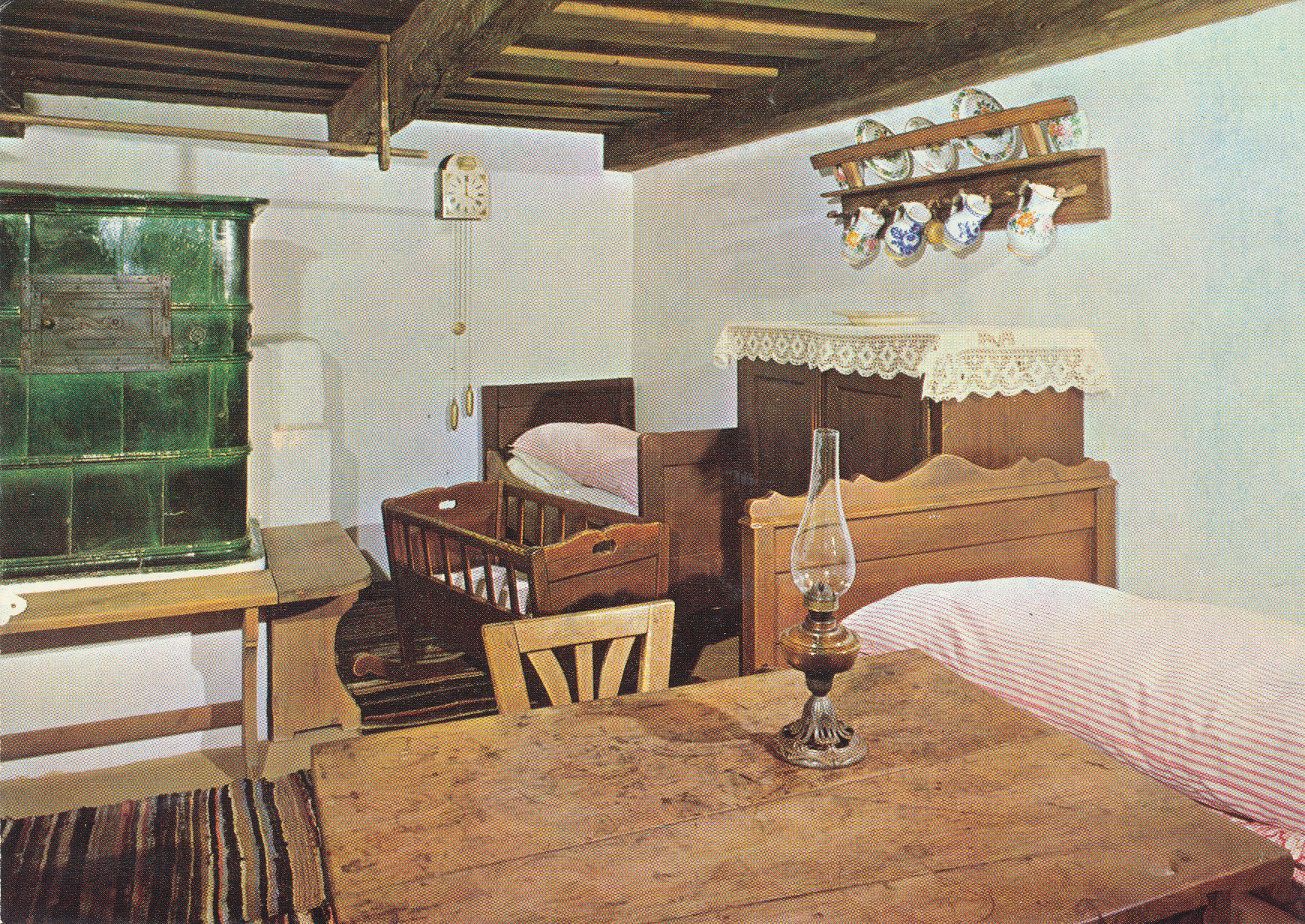
Klement Gottwald Memorial - native room, 1960s to 1970s

Until the turn of the 20th and 21st centuries, the historical part of Dědice has been preserved in the original layout of the floor plan and with the original material structure, with some exceptions. Thus, a number of houses on Dědická Street no longer stand on Svobody Square in places where, for example, there is a public transport stop today. The appearance of the square was modified, for example, in the 1980s, when the monument to Klement Gottwald was moved from its original location, and even later. After the Velvet Revolution, the statue of Klement Gottwald from 1956 (by Vincenc Havel of Opava) was removed.

==== Monuments ====
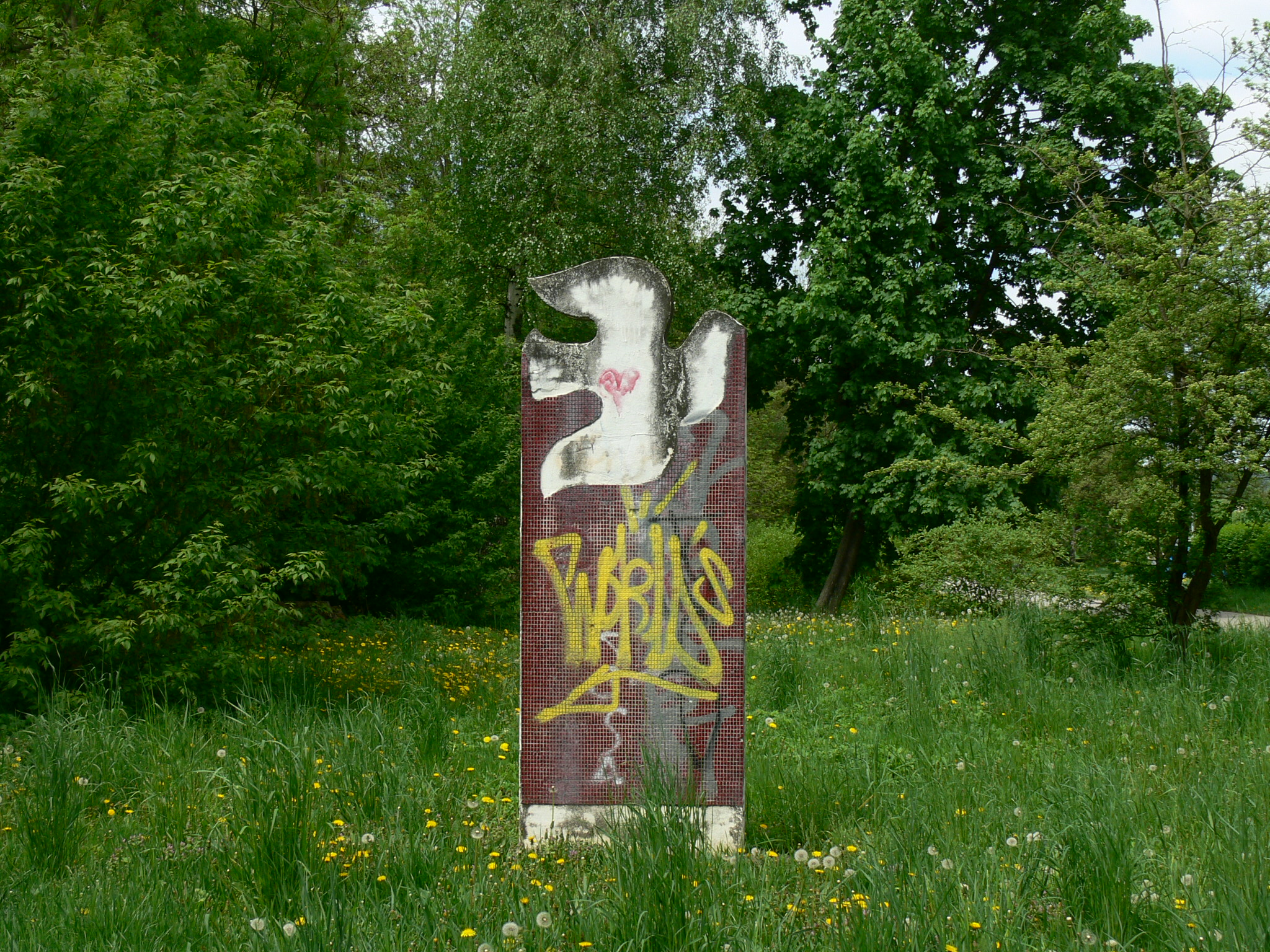
Dove of Peace in Dědice Park next to the Haná River

Today, there is a monument to the victims of the First World War bearing the inscription: In memory of the citizens of Dědice, Hamiltony and Pazderna who fell in World War I in 1914–1918, which was built here in 1921. Later, the monument was relocated and stood at the top of the cemetery in Dědice, and a monument to Klement Gottwald was erected on the square, which stood there until the early 1990s, when it was removed and subsequently stored in the depository of the Vyškov Region Museum in Dědice. After the change of circumstances in 1989, the monument to the victims of the First World War was repaired and in 2009 moved to Svobody Square.

In the area of the barracks next to the housing estate of Vít Nejedlý (Kozí Horka (Note: According to a legend called From Giant Slippers, one of the three giants who went out into the world to find a suitable seat hurried about Kozí Horka in a hurry. They liked the middle of Moravia, because it was visible far from there and close in all directions. The aforementioned giant, after hard work on the construction of a castle in the Drahany Highlands, breaking and carrying together with other rocks, from which they built high walls, made holes in the depths and large domes, passages and halls, jumped to a stream (Morava River) to wash their feet. He sat on the shore, and as he splashed his feet in the water, he reached out into the grass and fell asleep. After waking up, he realized that he was asleep and that he would be late for work. He sought to make up for the time lost with long leaps forward back to the Drahany Highlands. On his return, however, he tripped hard about Kozí Horka and almost fell over. As he did so, he picked up a lot of dirt that pushed him. That's why he took them out, knocked the clay out of them and hurried on after the species. A nice hill remains from the dumped clay on the spot, which can still be seen on the hereditary "Padělky" towards Drnovice.)) there is a monument to Ludvík Svoboda and at the southern edge of the platform there is a monument to military operations in the 1st and 2nd World Wars from 1977. There is also a monument to the operations of the Second World War.

== Demographics ==
Historical population

Year	Pop.	±%
1869	1,570	—
1880	1,692	+7.8%
1890	1,714	+1.3%
1900	1,738	+1.4%
1910	1,786	+2.8%

Year	Pop.	±%
1921	1,843	+3.2%
1930	1,847	+0.2%
1950	1,750	−5.3%
1961	2,783	+59.0%
1970	4,267	+53.3%

Year	Pop.	±%
1980	4,718	+10.6%
1991	6,659	+41.1%
2001	7,118	+6.9%
2011	6,287	−11.7%
2021	5,668	−9.8%

Source: Censuses

== Urban development ==
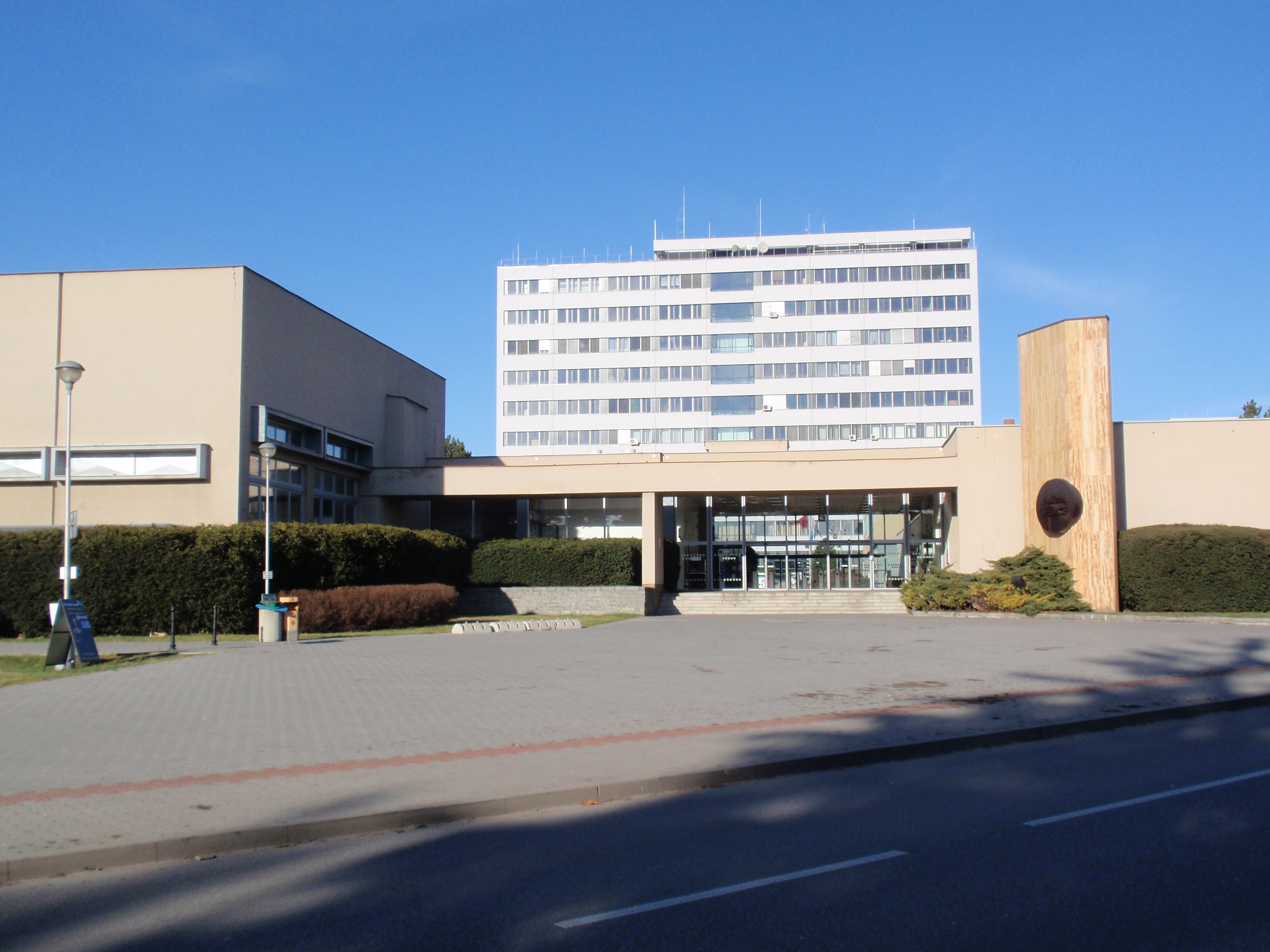
Campus of military schools in Dědice, Barracks Dědice

It is not known when the older settlement was rearranged into a unit with a large spindle square with a church standing in the middle. The core of Dědice is a semi-trailer road, the shape of which is influenced by a stream in the northwest. Residential and farm buildings are arranged in a street. Behind the enclosed courtyards are gardens and fields. Hamiltony originated as a raabization alley. After their creation, they were built on one side of the road. The core of Pazderna is a small, rectangular village square, which is open to the west.

In the third quarter of the 13th century, a castle was built on a watchtower upstream in the Velká Haná valley, according to which Milota of Dědice had the nickname. The castle was located near a long-distance route leading through the Drahany Highlands and the Vyškov Gate to South Moravia (Hodonín Region). The castle of Dědice disappeared at the beginning of the 15th century at the latest, as evidenced by the ceramics found on the site. The castle disappears from historical sources in the second quarter of the 16th century. Until the beginning of the 3rd millennium, terrain remains and foundations on a short right-bank watchtower to the bend of Velká Haná have been preserved.

The castle was built on the last suitable promontory of the Drahany Highlands, before the valley of the river Haná melts into the plain. The layout of the castle consisted of two parts. Two moats separated the fort from the ascending and widening continuation of the promontory. The space was after the World War II violated by alterations to the auditorium and summer theater. It looks like the castle was without a tower. In 1372, the Šternberk burgrave was here, which means that after the middle of the 14th century, the castle of Dědice belonged to the Šternberk family and its use continued.

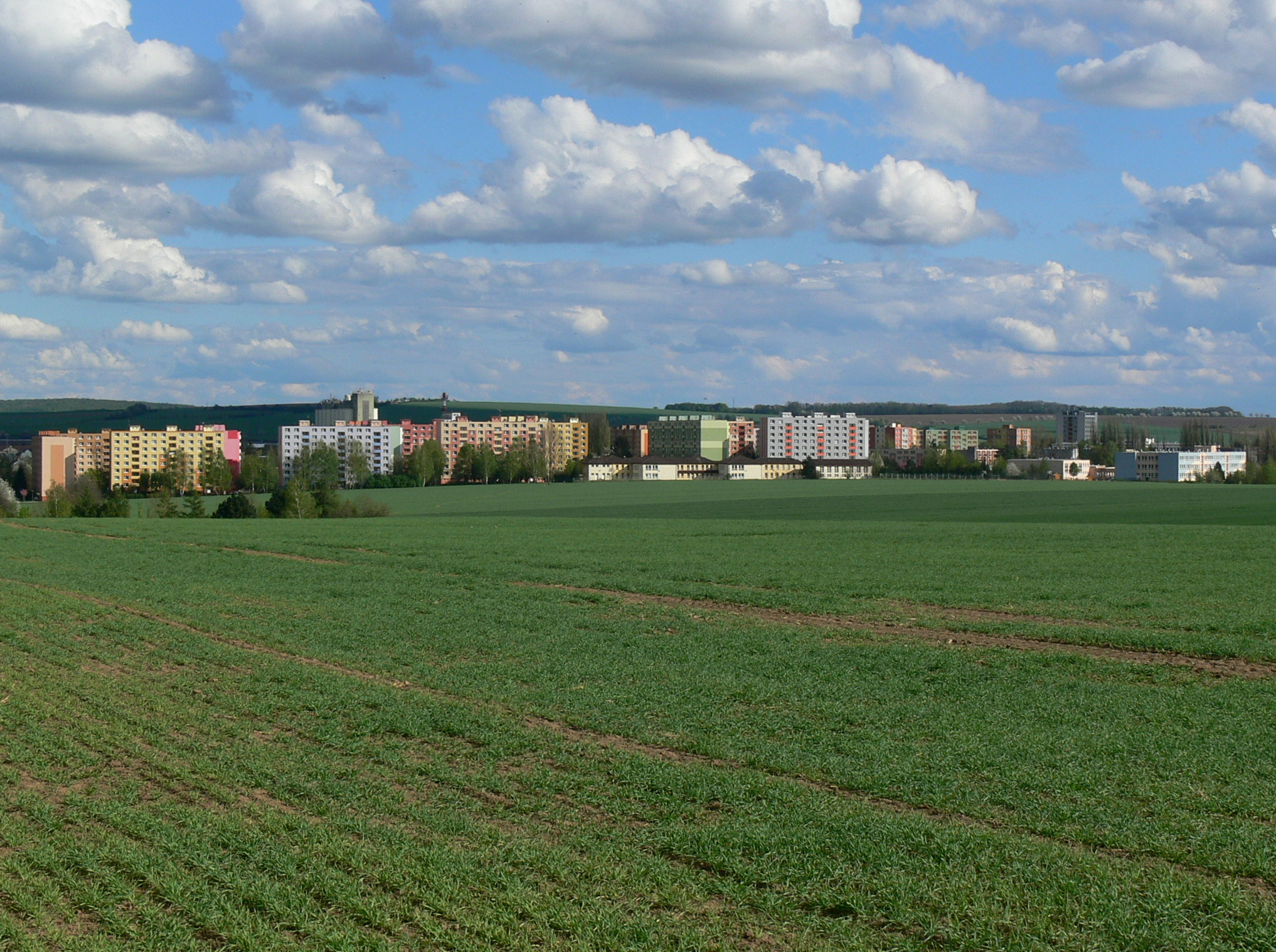
Osvobození housing estate, Hraničky housing estate

The role of the castle of Dědice was taken over before 1381 by the newly built Stagnov Castle, located deeper in the Drahany Highlands. The promotion of Dědice, which took place sometime before 1371, is mainly explained by his role as a small town. Dědice were clearly built in the Middle Ages as a competitor of nearby Vyškov.

The original core of Dědice is located to the right of the Haná River. On the left bank of Haná in Závodí there was only the lordship court and opposite the bridge over Haná there were several homesteads. The Thirty Years' War severely affected Dědice. At the end of the 17th and in the first half of the 18th century, the development stabilized and developed slightly. After the fire, the medieval church was replaced by a new, much larger late Baroque building. The town had a more rural character at this time. Around 1760, a small settlement Pazderna was founded between Dědice and Vyškov on the territory of Dědice, and soon afterwards a village-type settlement Hamiltony was founded in the valley below the remains of the castle of Dědice. Pazderna and Hamiltony became settlements of Dědice.

In the second half of the 19th century, the number of houses gradually increased as the existing buildings densified. A large school building was built next to the church.

After the arrival of soldiers in the mid-1930s, a complex of barracks began to grow above Dědice and Hamiltony, which gradually reached considerable size. Construction of the housing estate next to the barracks began in the 1950s. High-rise buildings were built at the turn of the 1970s and 1980s, when the local military school, which originally resembled another, grew into the largest military school in the state. At first, the whole established in the eastern part of the Drahany Highlands, which includes shooting ranges and training grounds for tank units, infantry and artillery and other types of troops located in Central Moravia, was referred to as the Dědice military training camp and later as Březina. The military district was formed on the territory originally belonging to the cadastral territories of municipalities from the former political districts of Prostějov, Boskovice and Vyškov. Parts of the cadastral areas of these municipalities were newly merged into six cadastral areas (Doubrava u Březiny, Kotáry, Osina, Pulkava, Stříbrná u Březiny, Žbánov) when the district was created. At the beginning of the 3rd millennium, "Kozina" is the training center of the Army of the Czech Republic. There is also a British training center (British Military Advisory and Training Team (BMATT ČR)).

In 1960, a settlement of Vyškov, named Vít Nejedlý's Housing Estate, was newly created on the Dědice cadastral area. This settlement was merged with the settlement of Dědice on 1 January 1980. In addition to the establishment of a "military" housing estate in Kozina, new construction in the direction of Vyškov, such as the Hraničky housing estate, Juranova Street, Pionýrská Street, Antonína Zápotockého Street, contributed to the increase in population in the second half of the 20th century. The large increase was caused by the construction of the new housing estate Osvobození. Another new development was created in the area on the left side of the Haná River around A. B. Svojsíka Street.

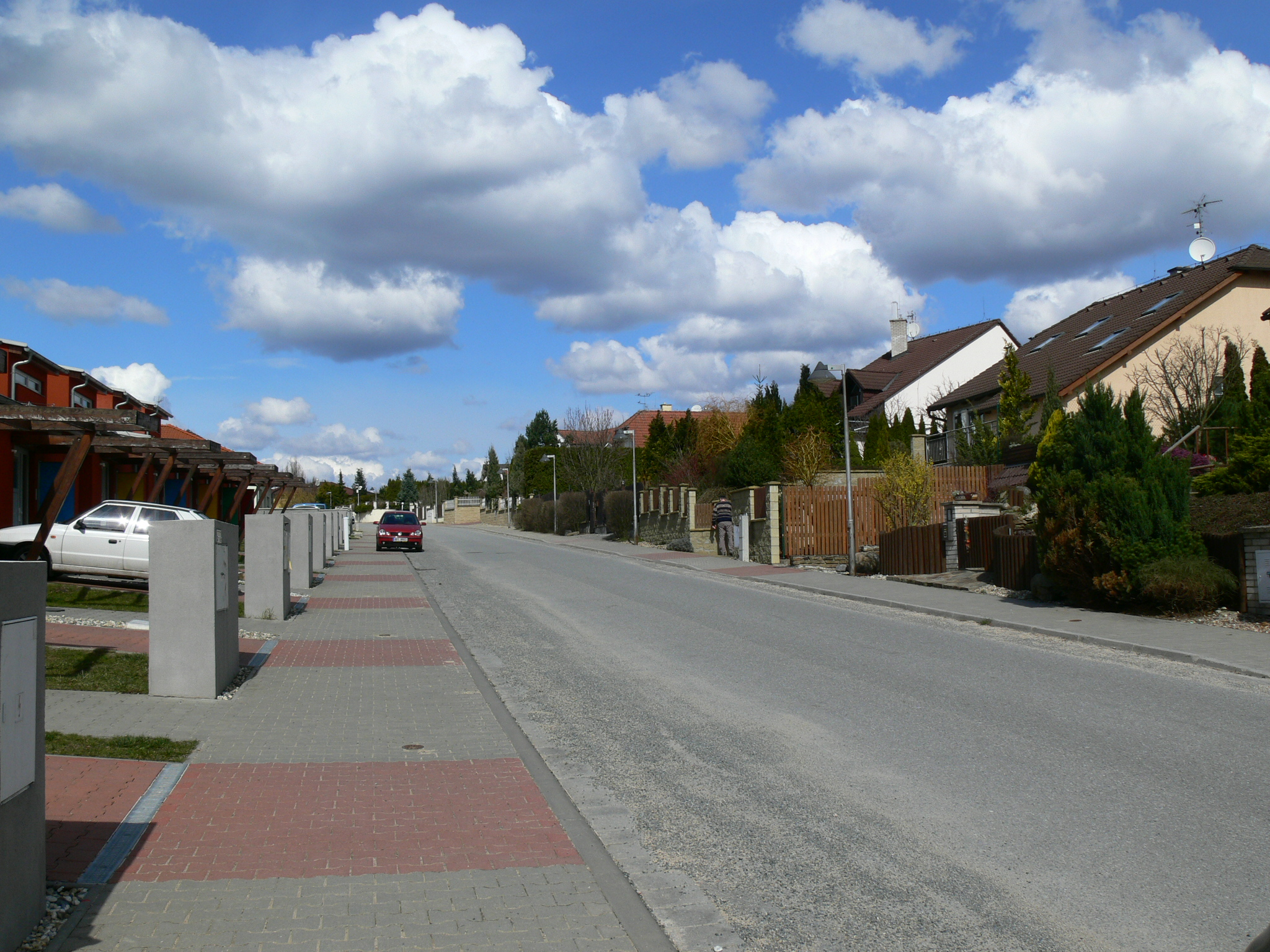
A. B. Svojsíka Street

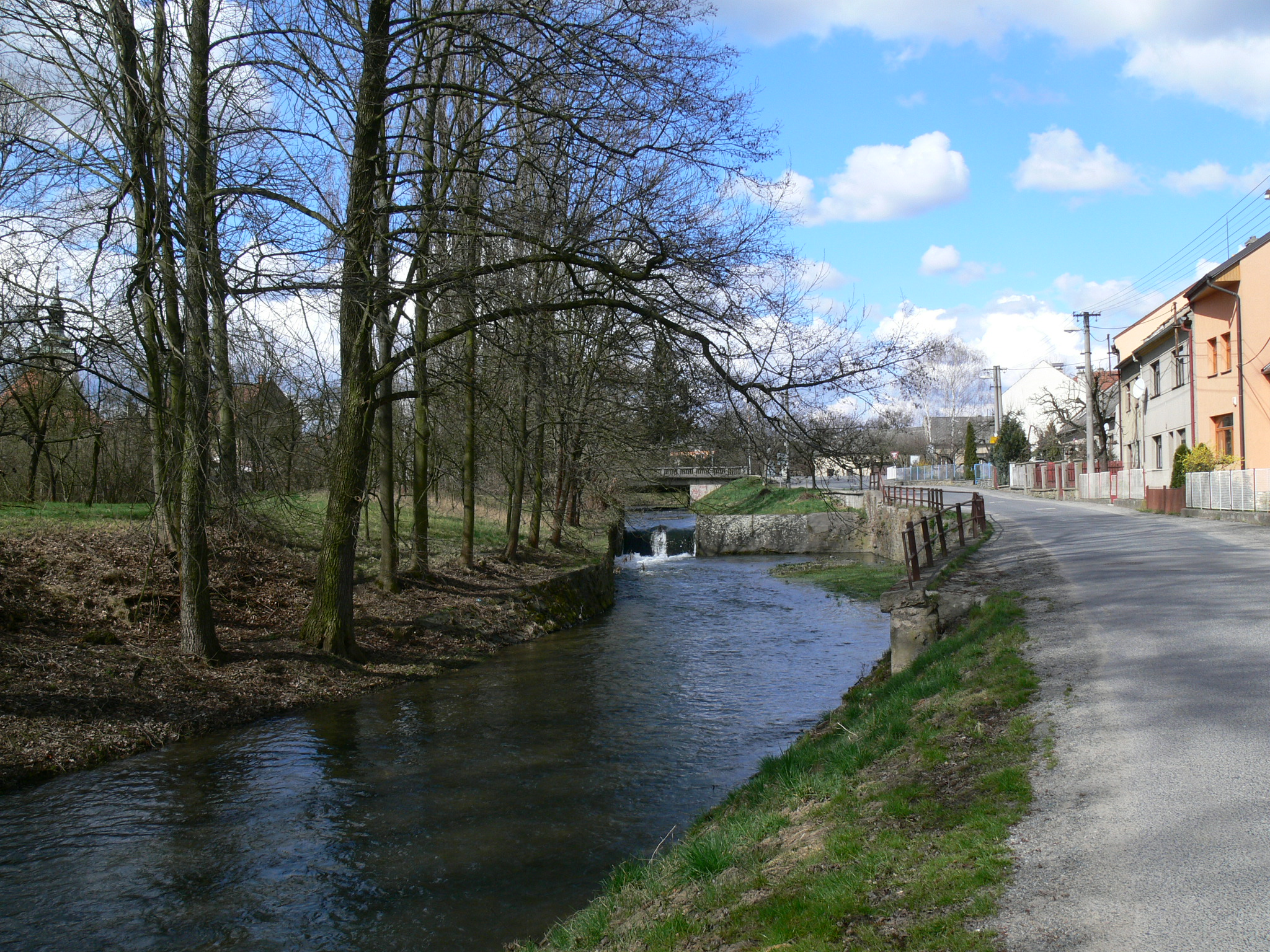
Závodí Street

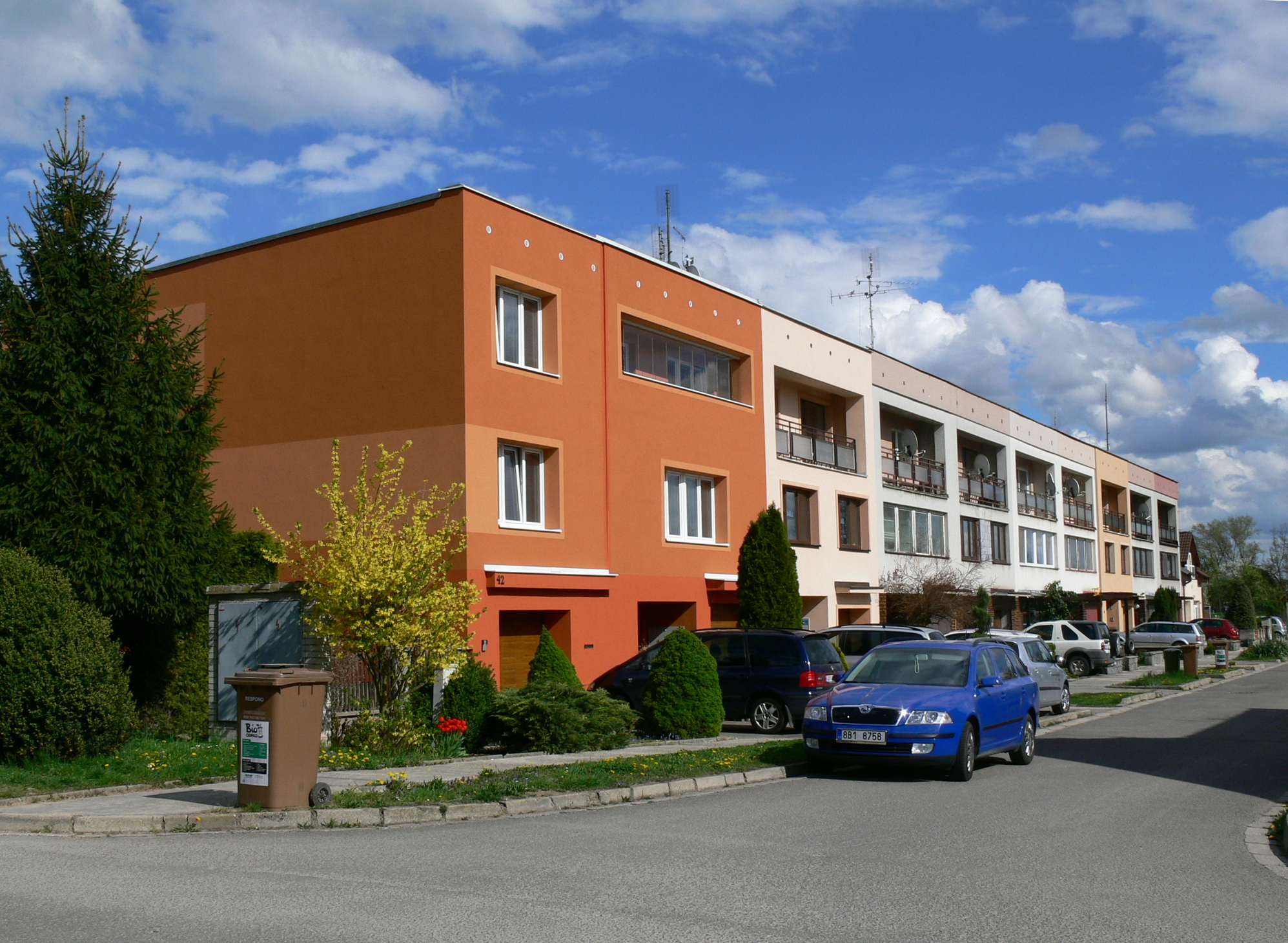
Revoluční Street

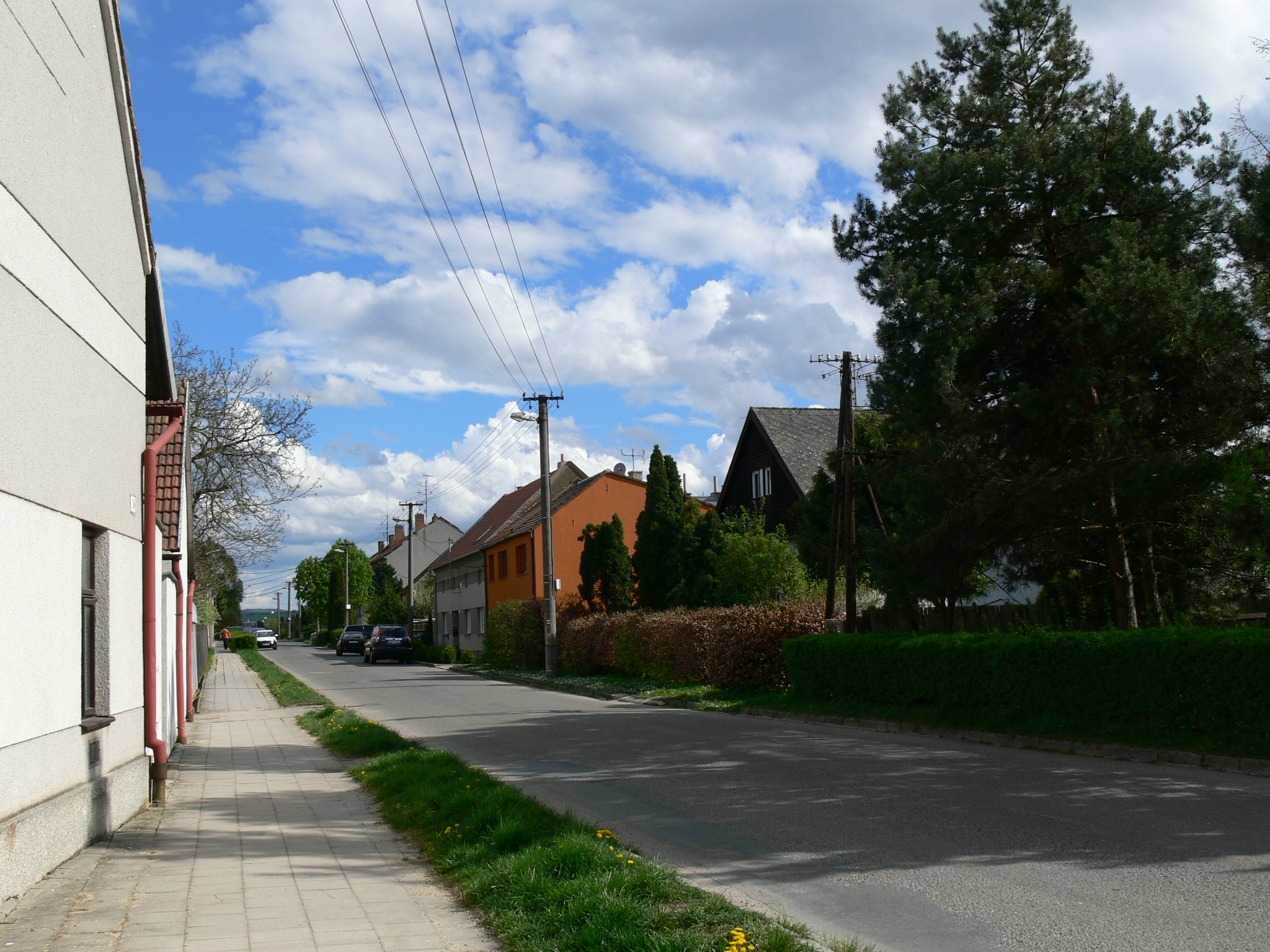
Jízdárenská Street

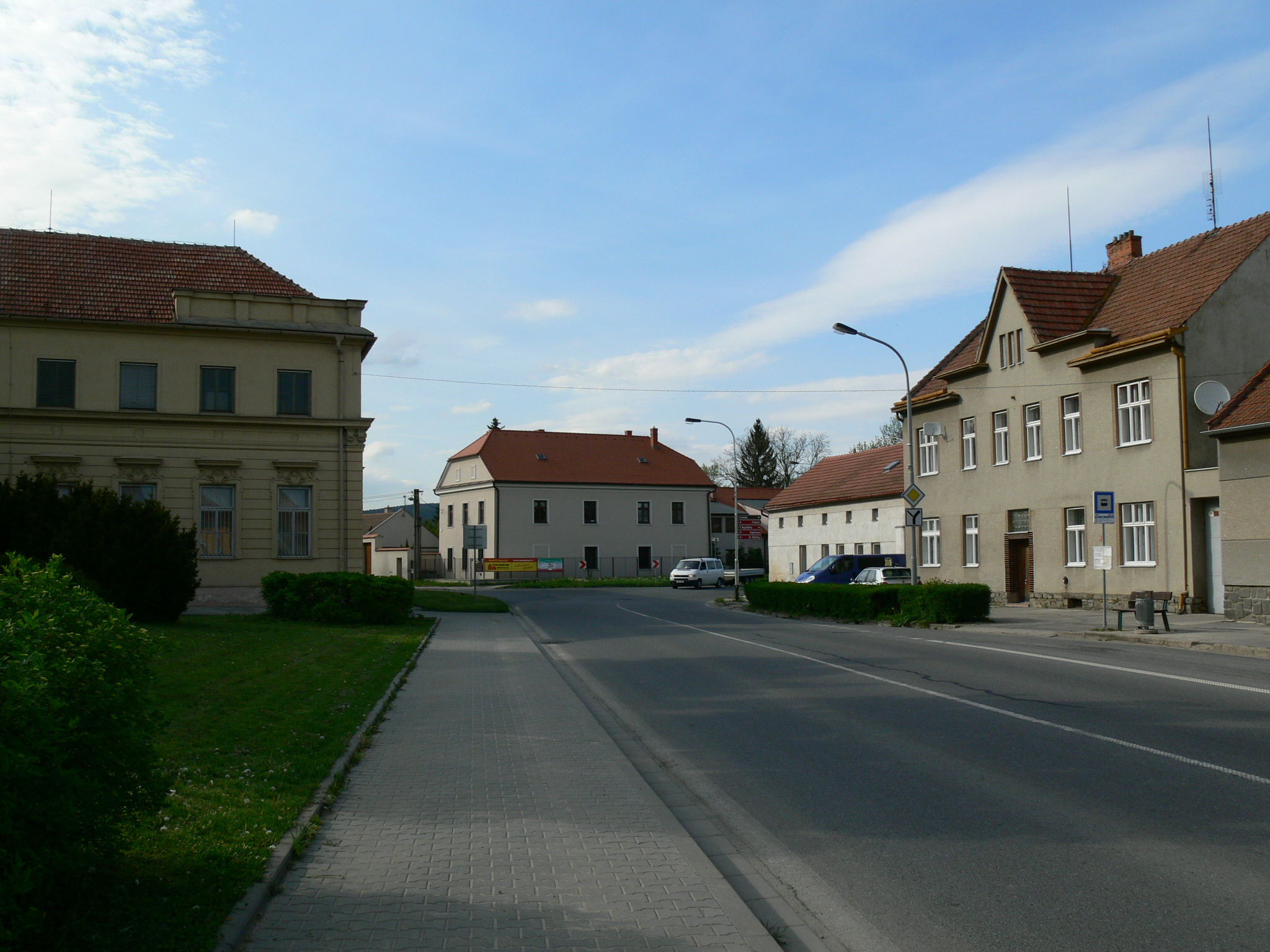
Svobody Square

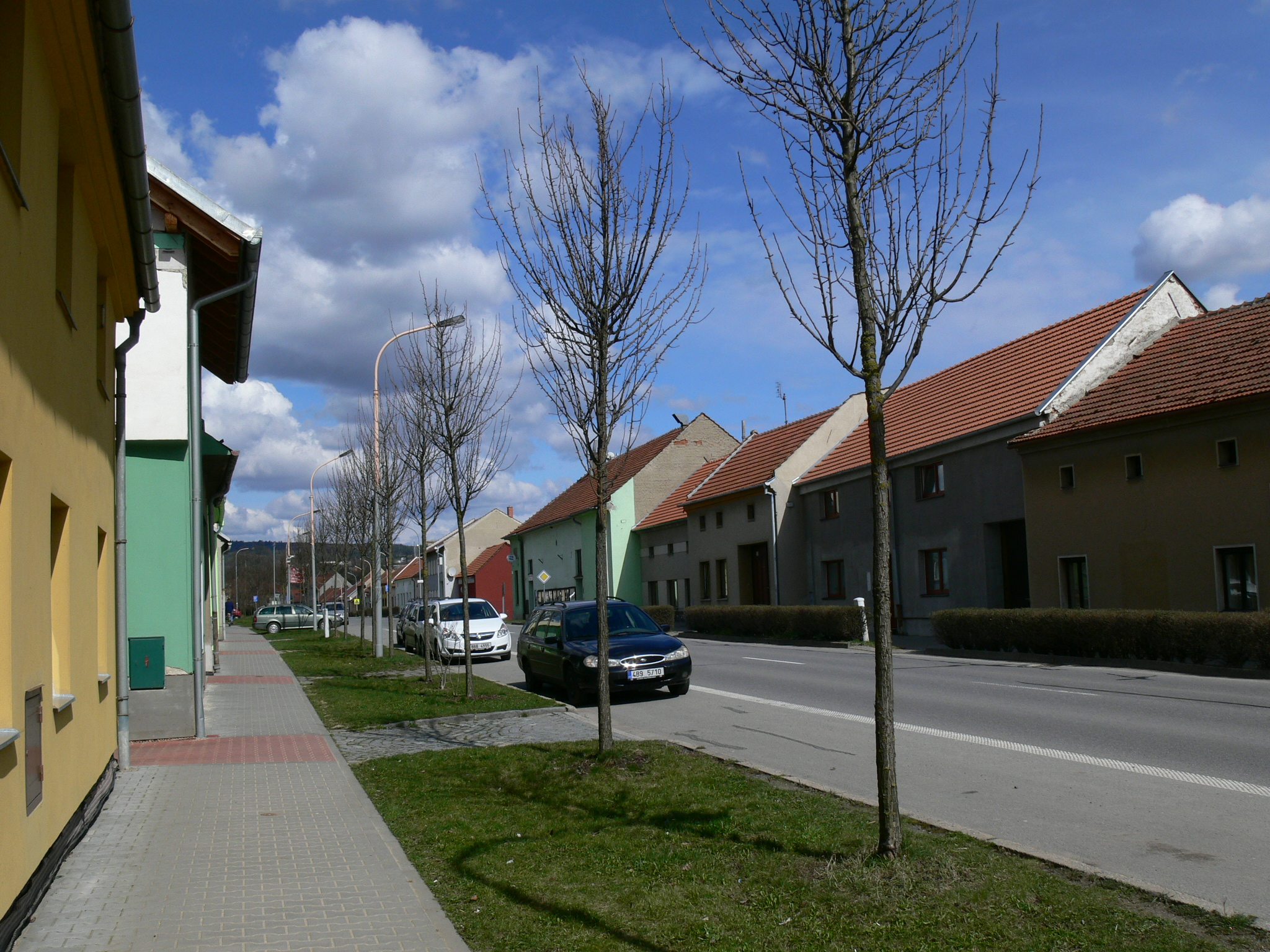
Dědická Street

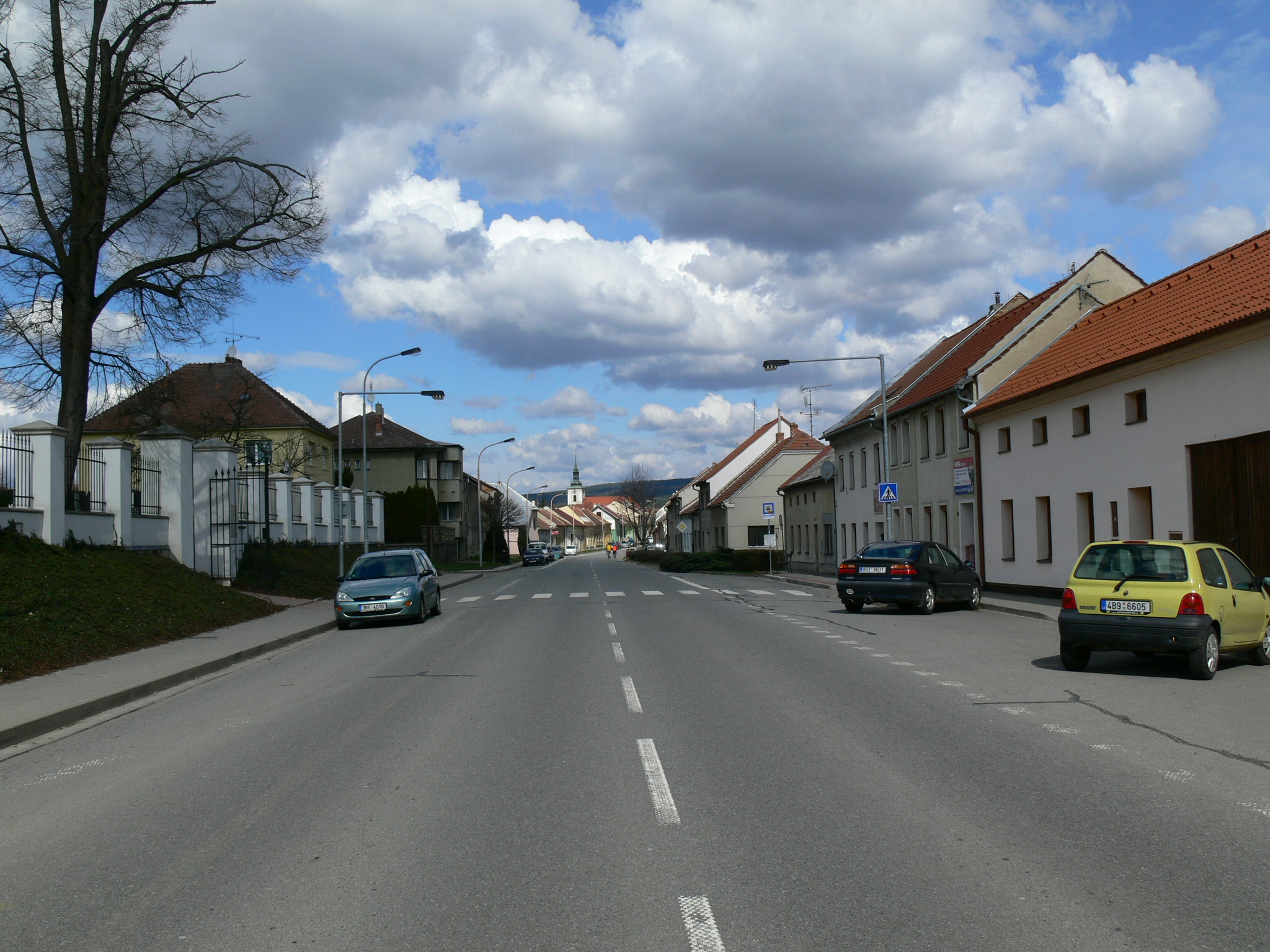
Dědická Street

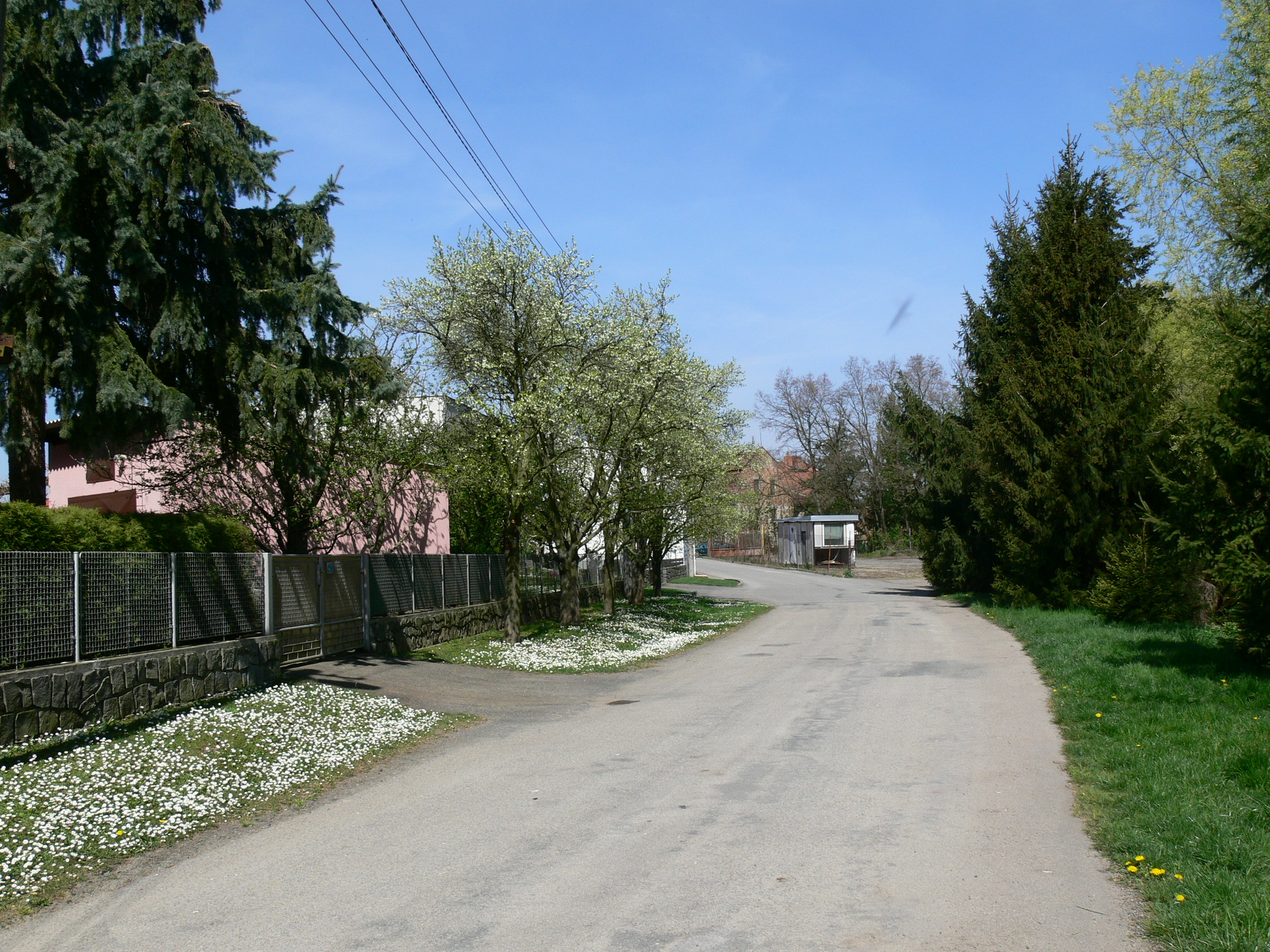
U Mlýna Street

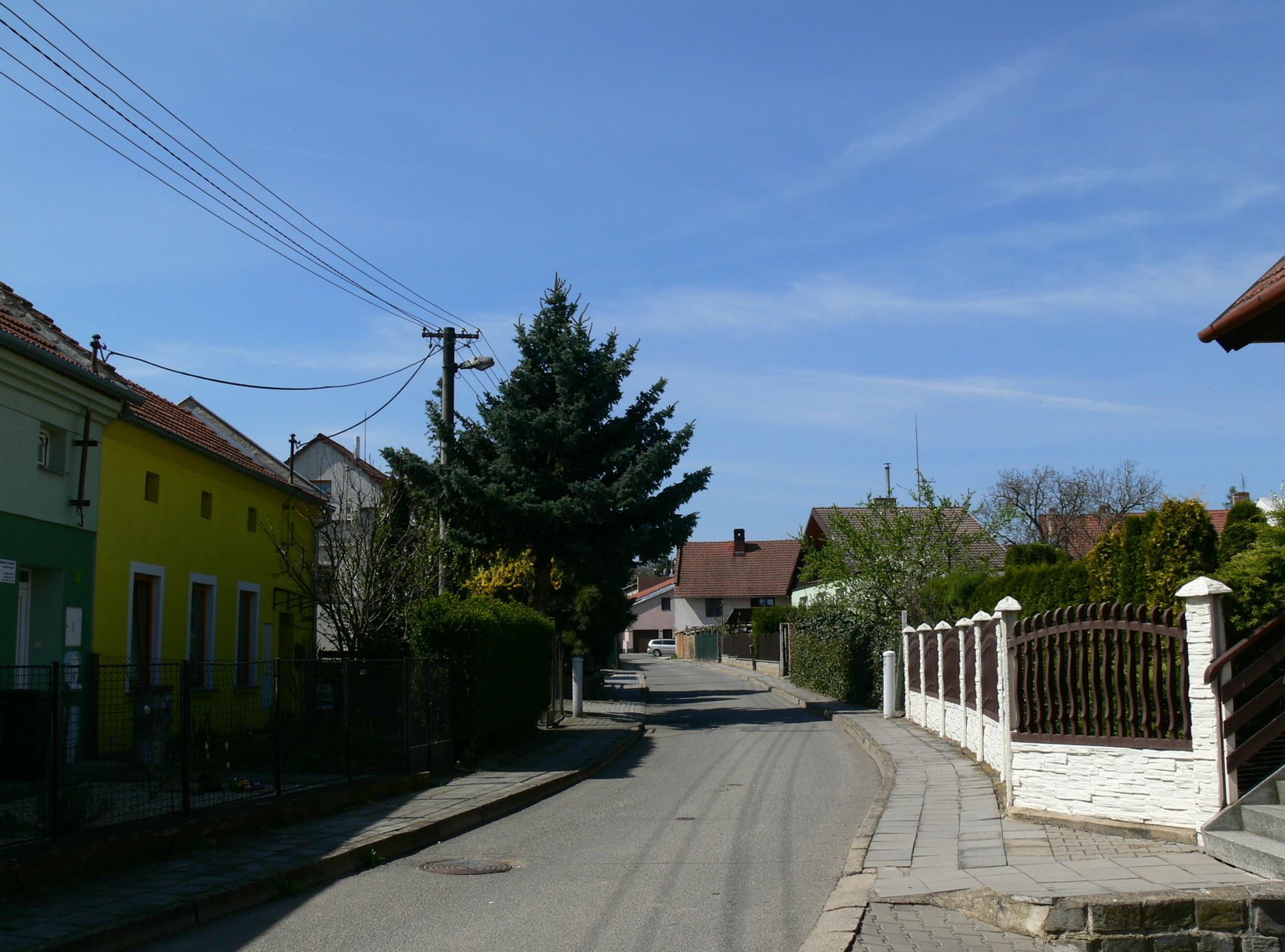
U Mlýna Street

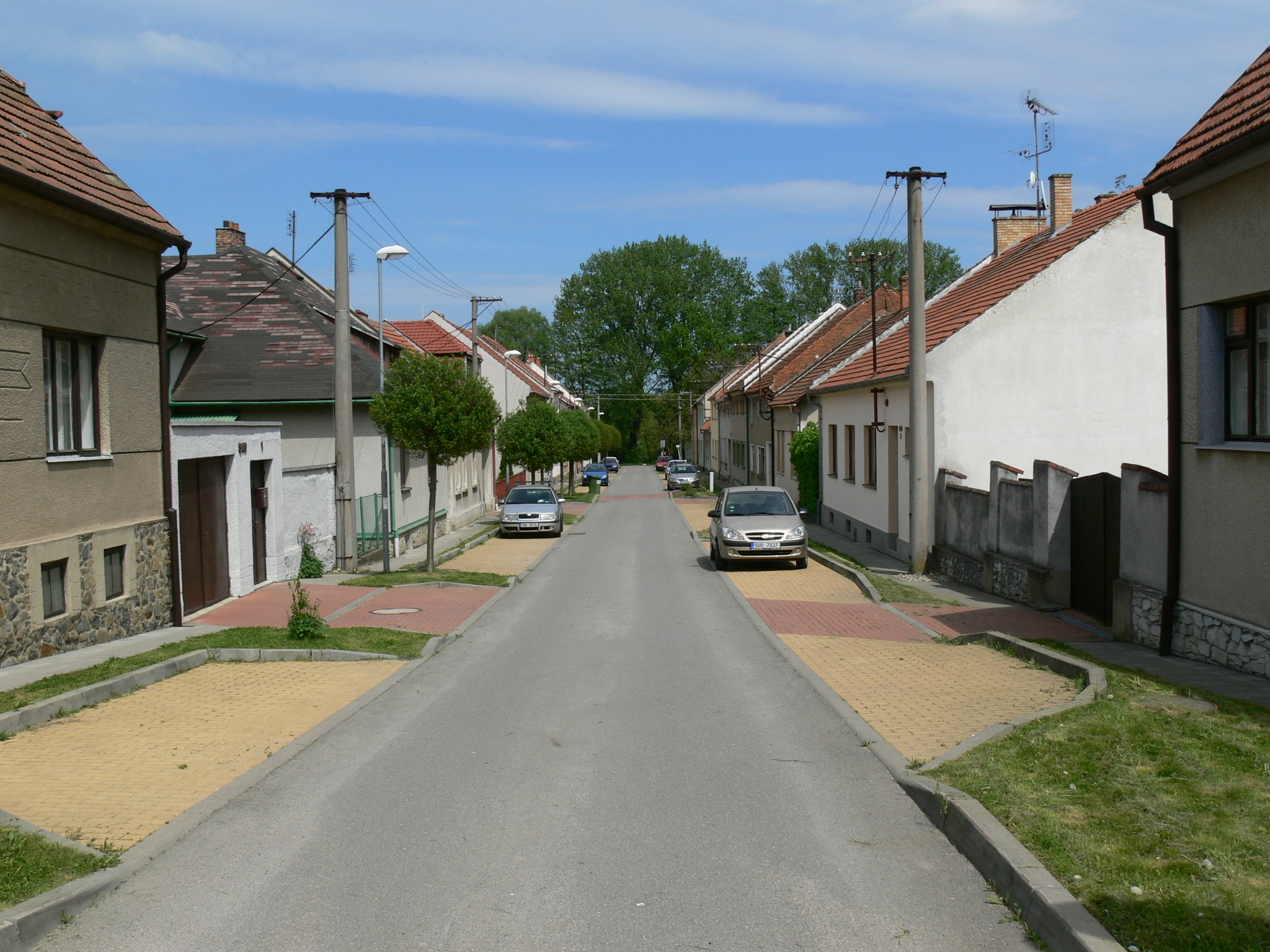
Mánesova Street

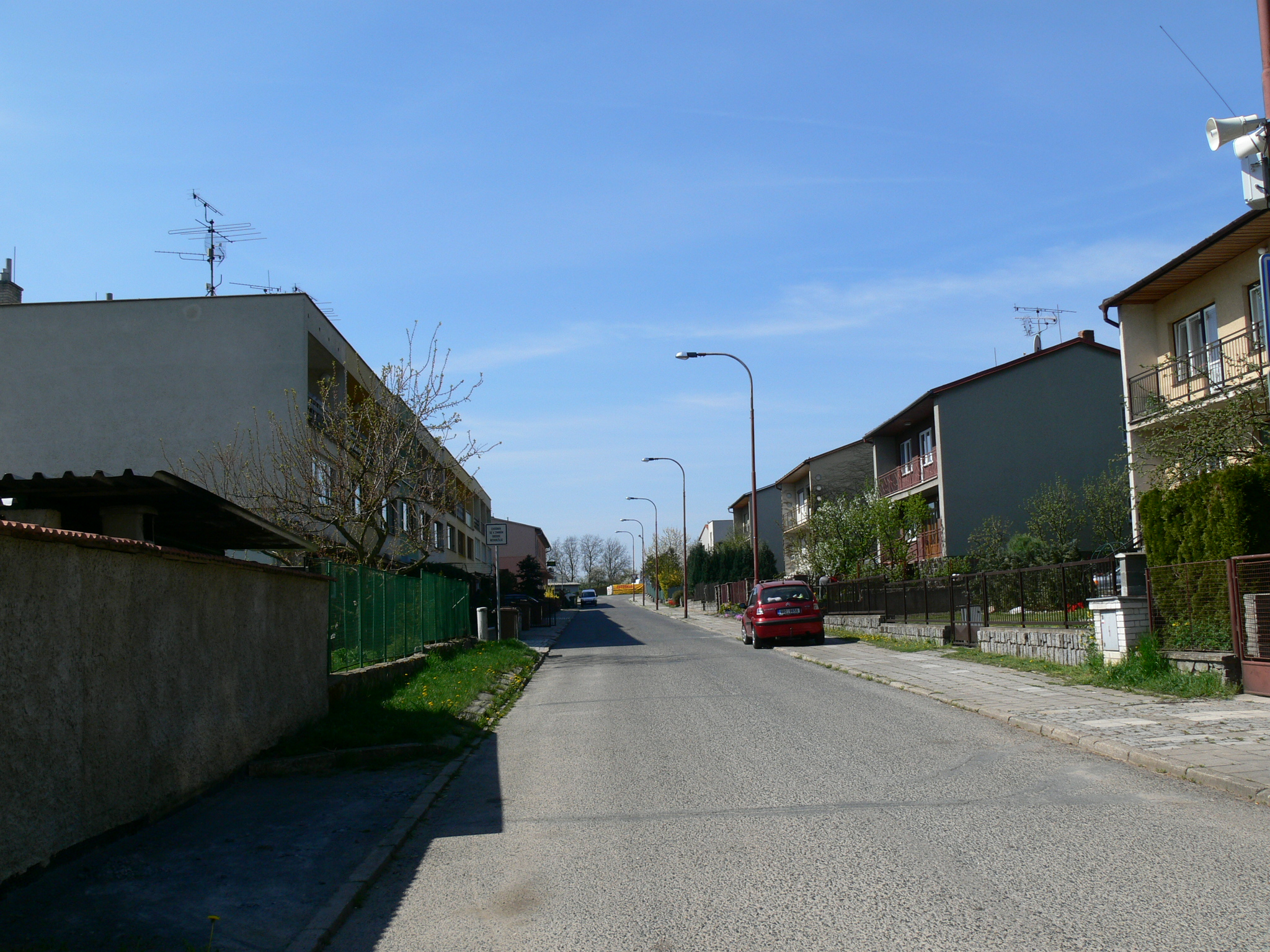
Juranova Street

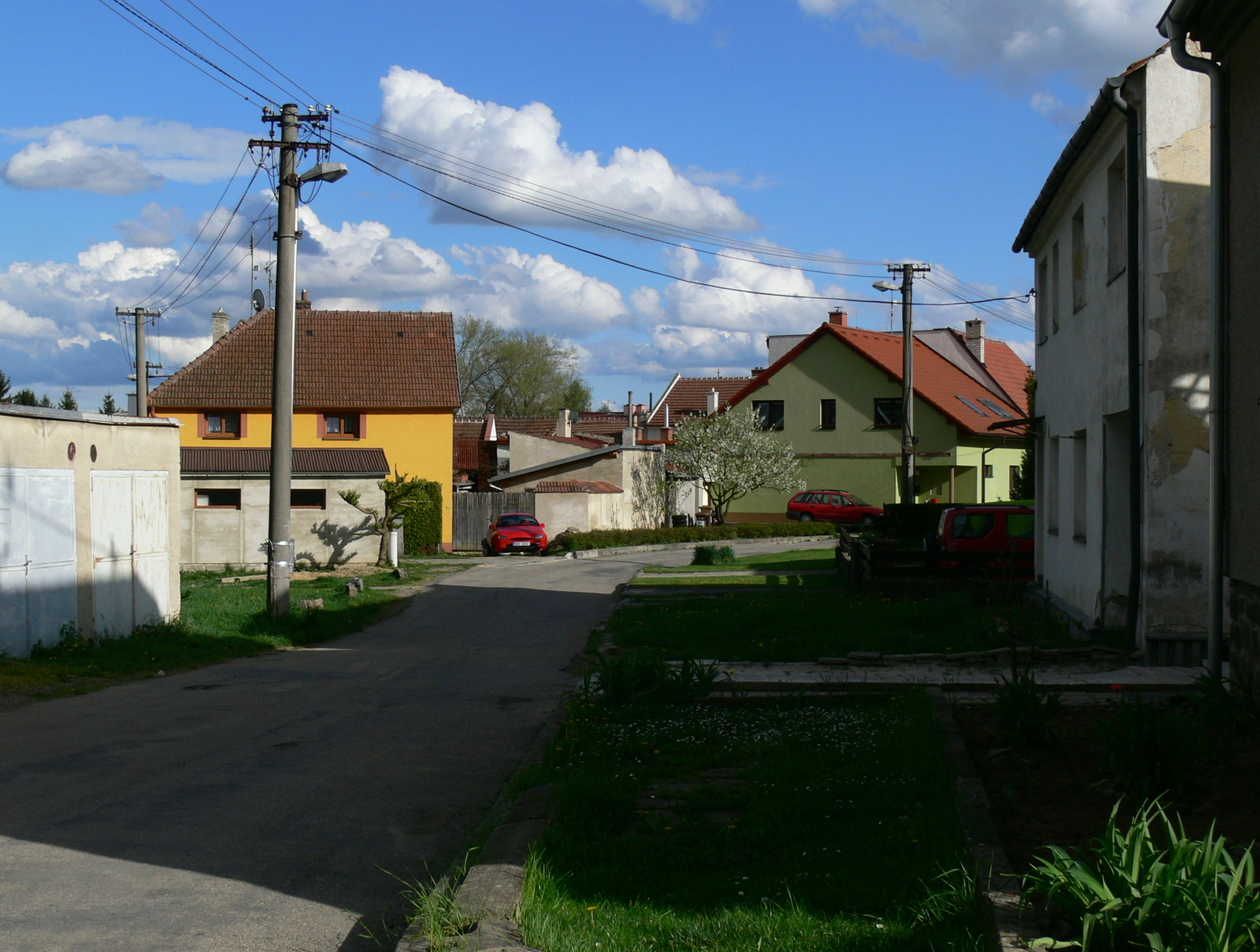
U Splavu Street

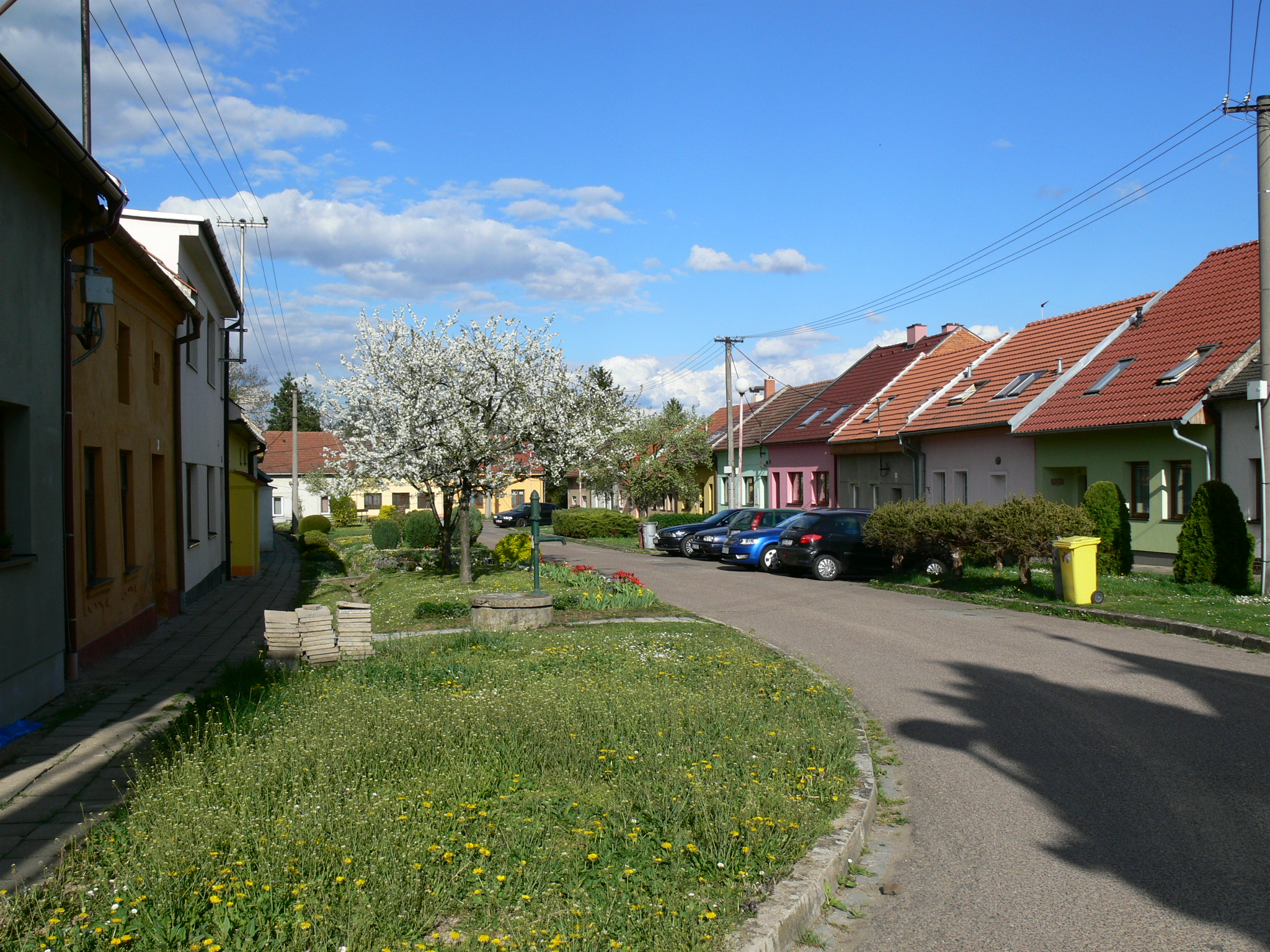
Pazderna

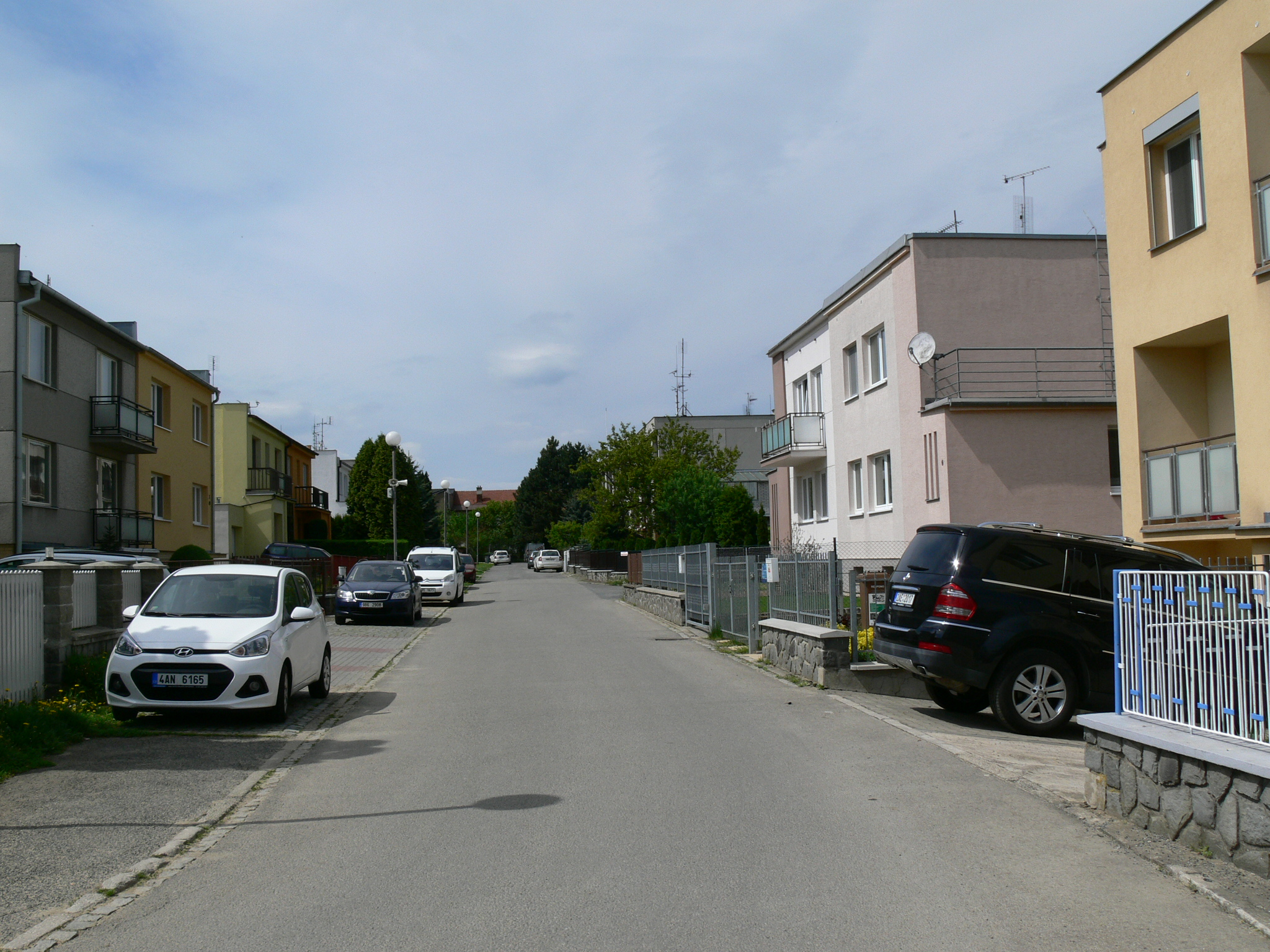
Antonína Zápotockého Street

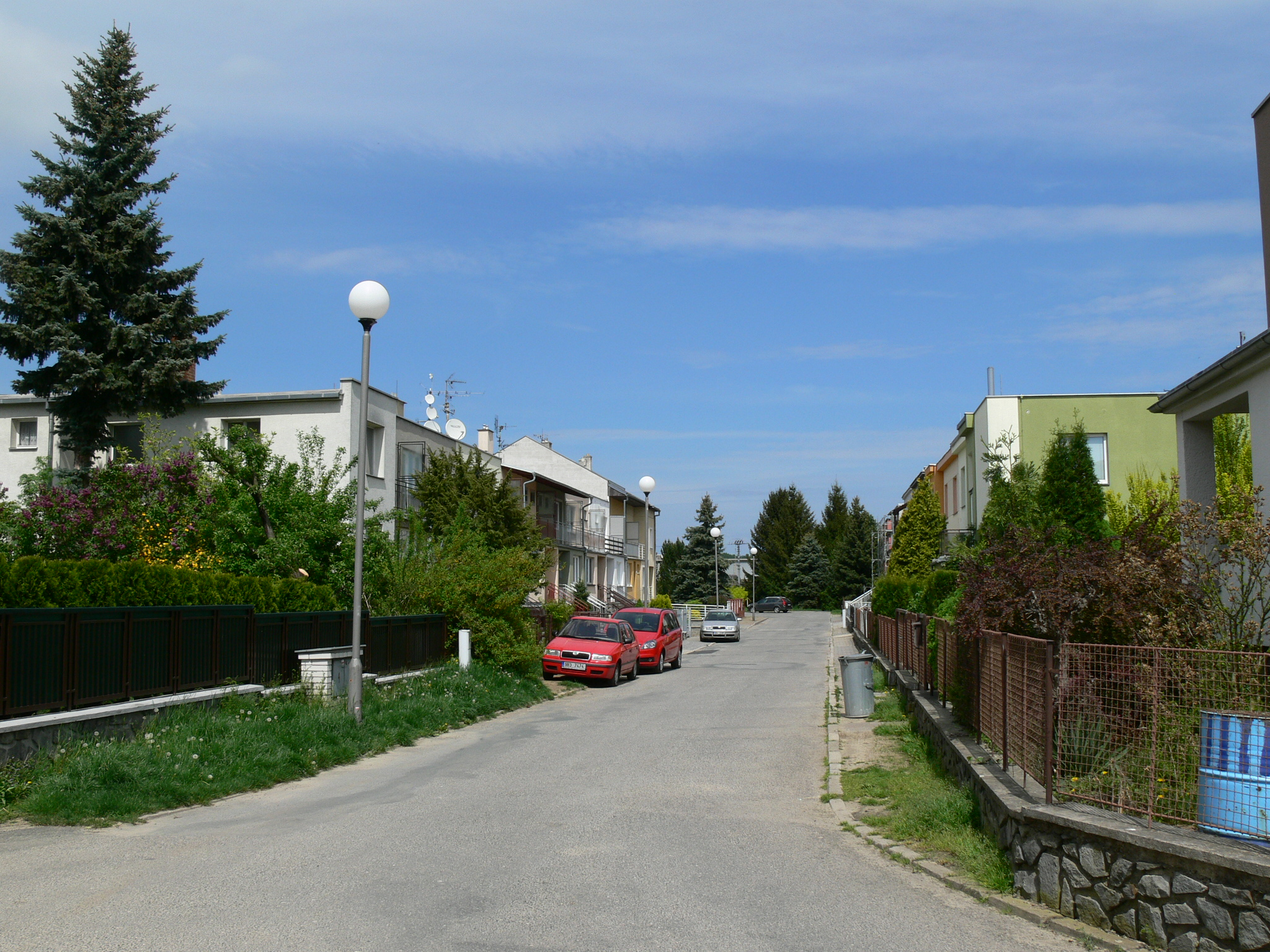
Pionýrská Street

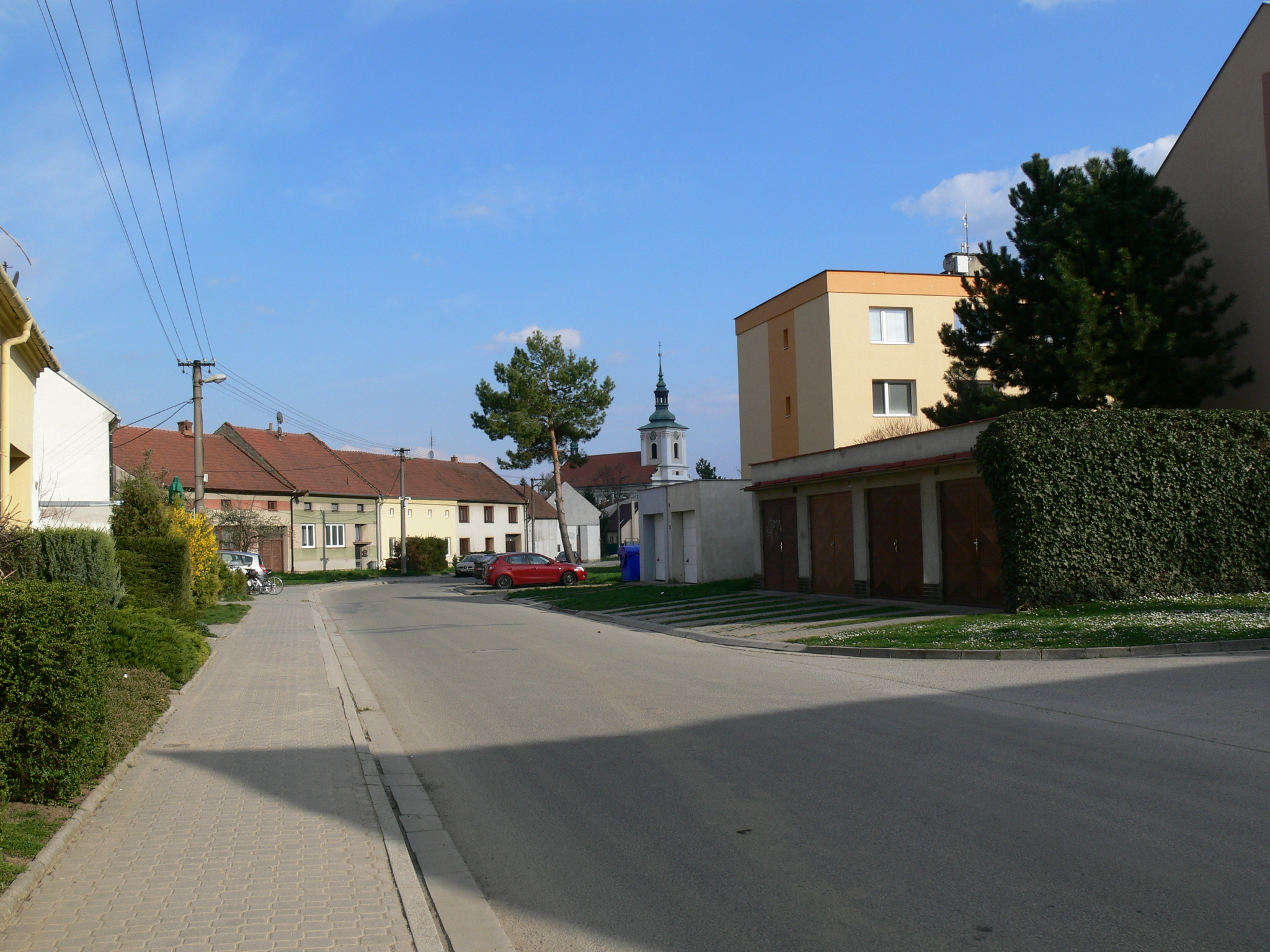
Potoční Street

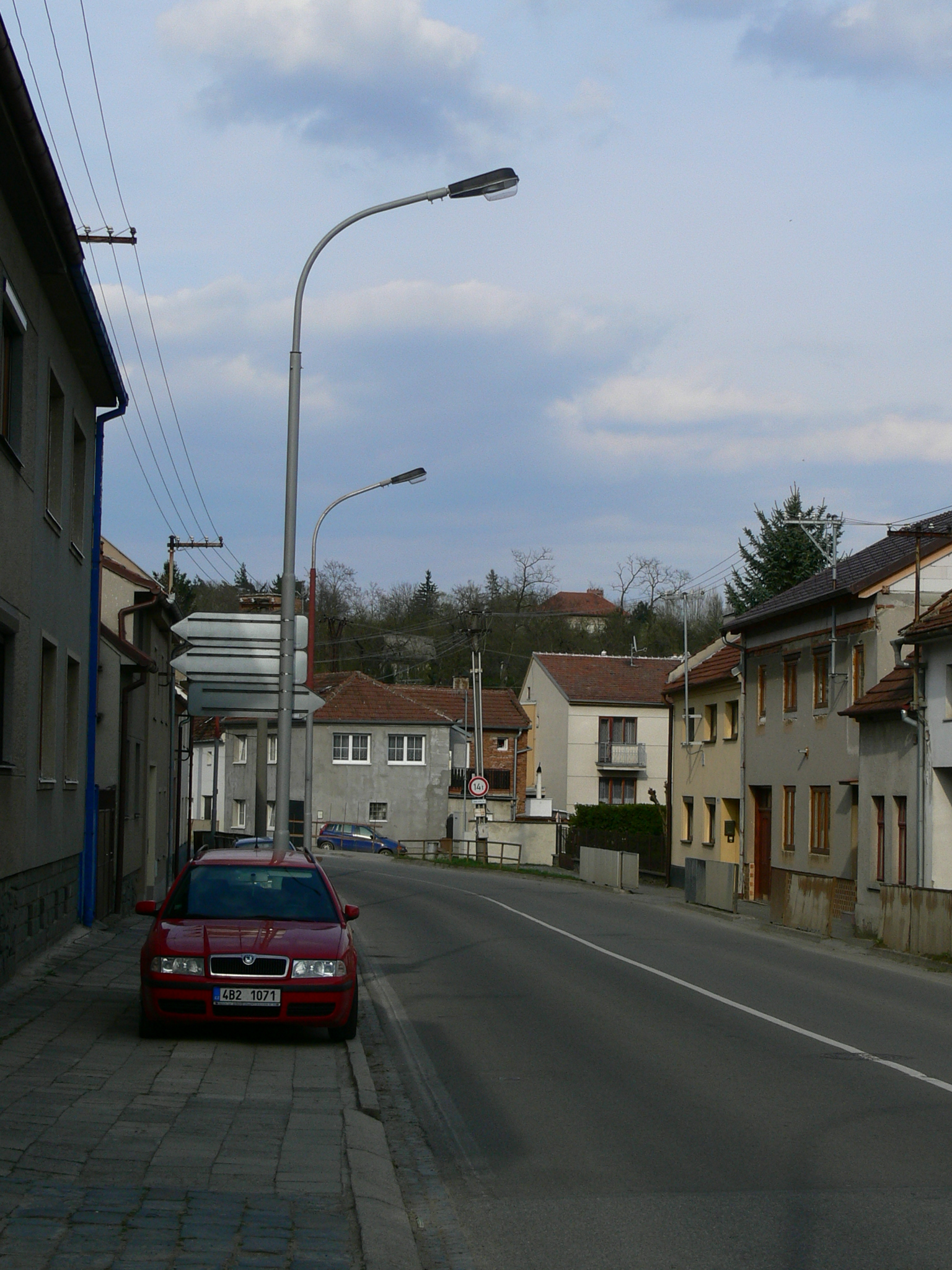
Palackého Street

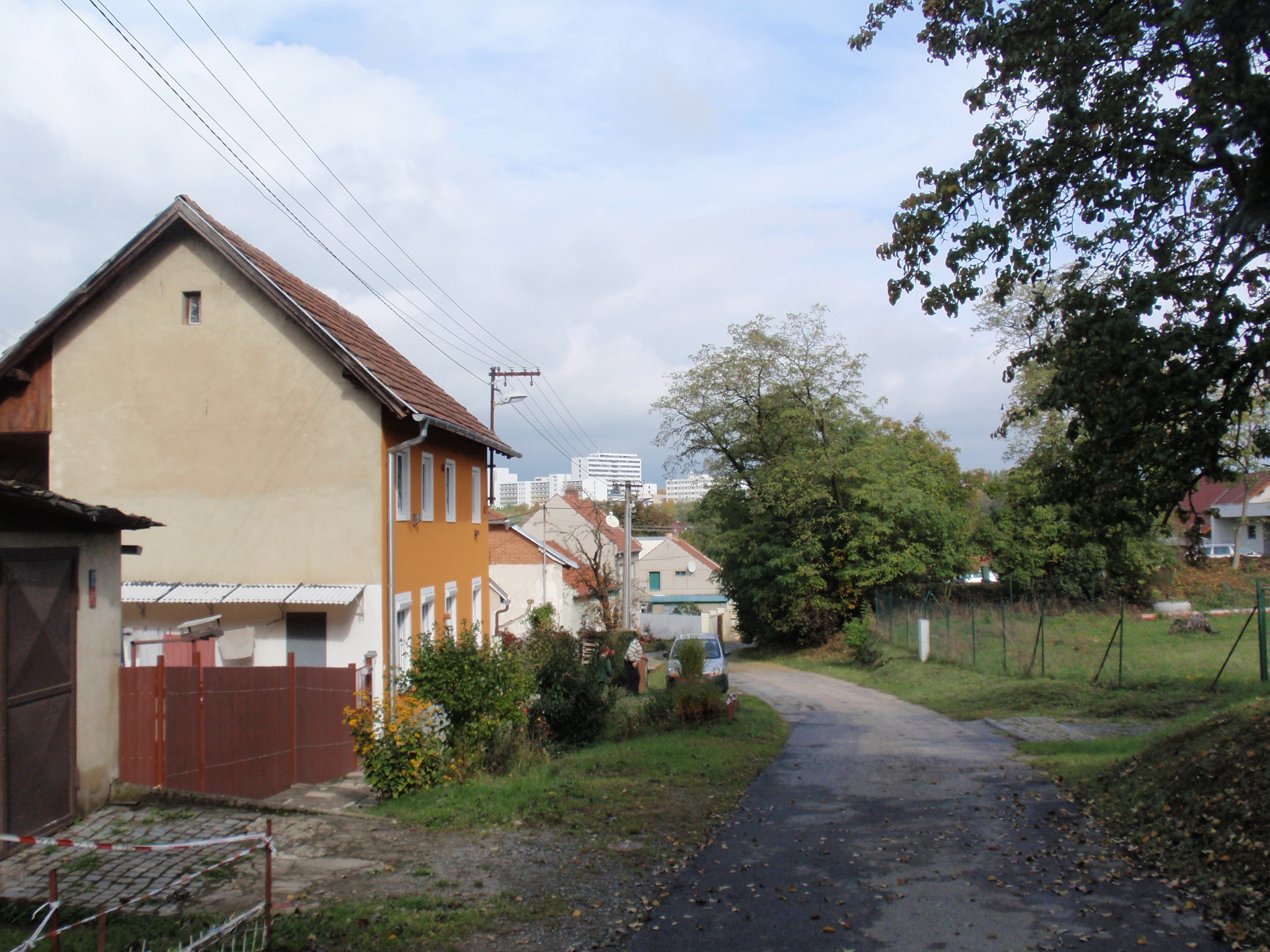
Padouchy, Doktora Růžičky Street

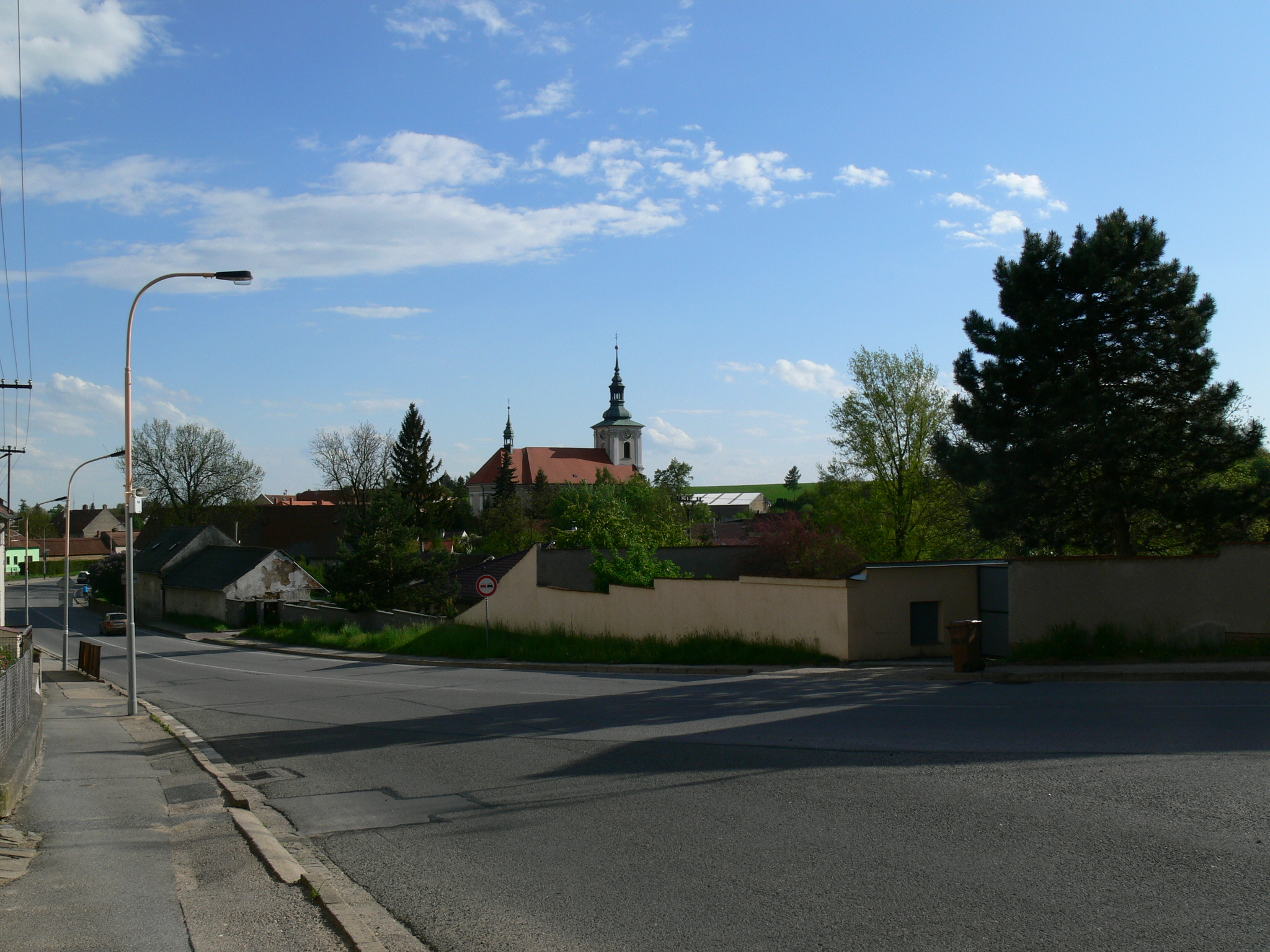
Morávkova Street

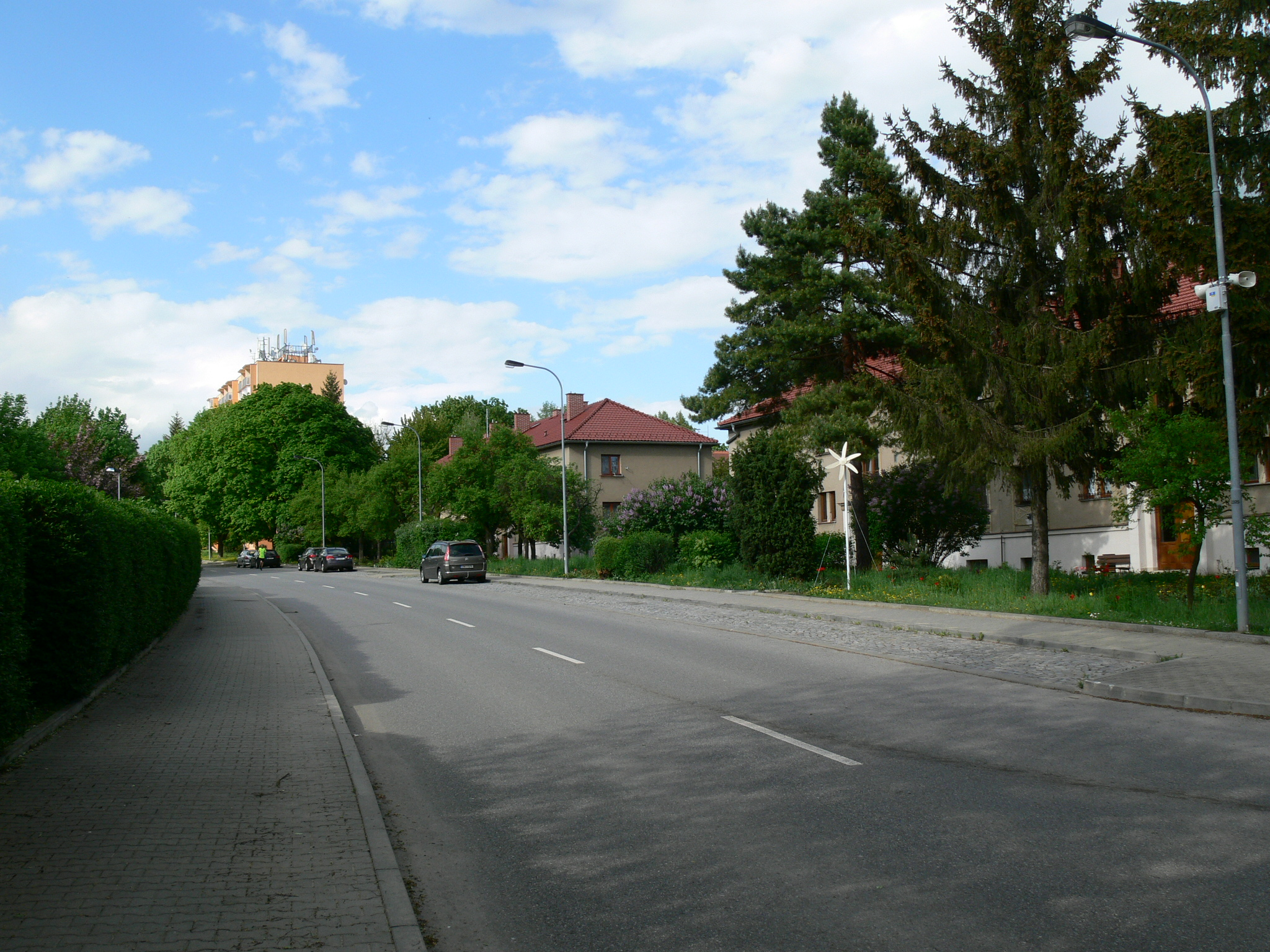
Víta Nejedlého Street

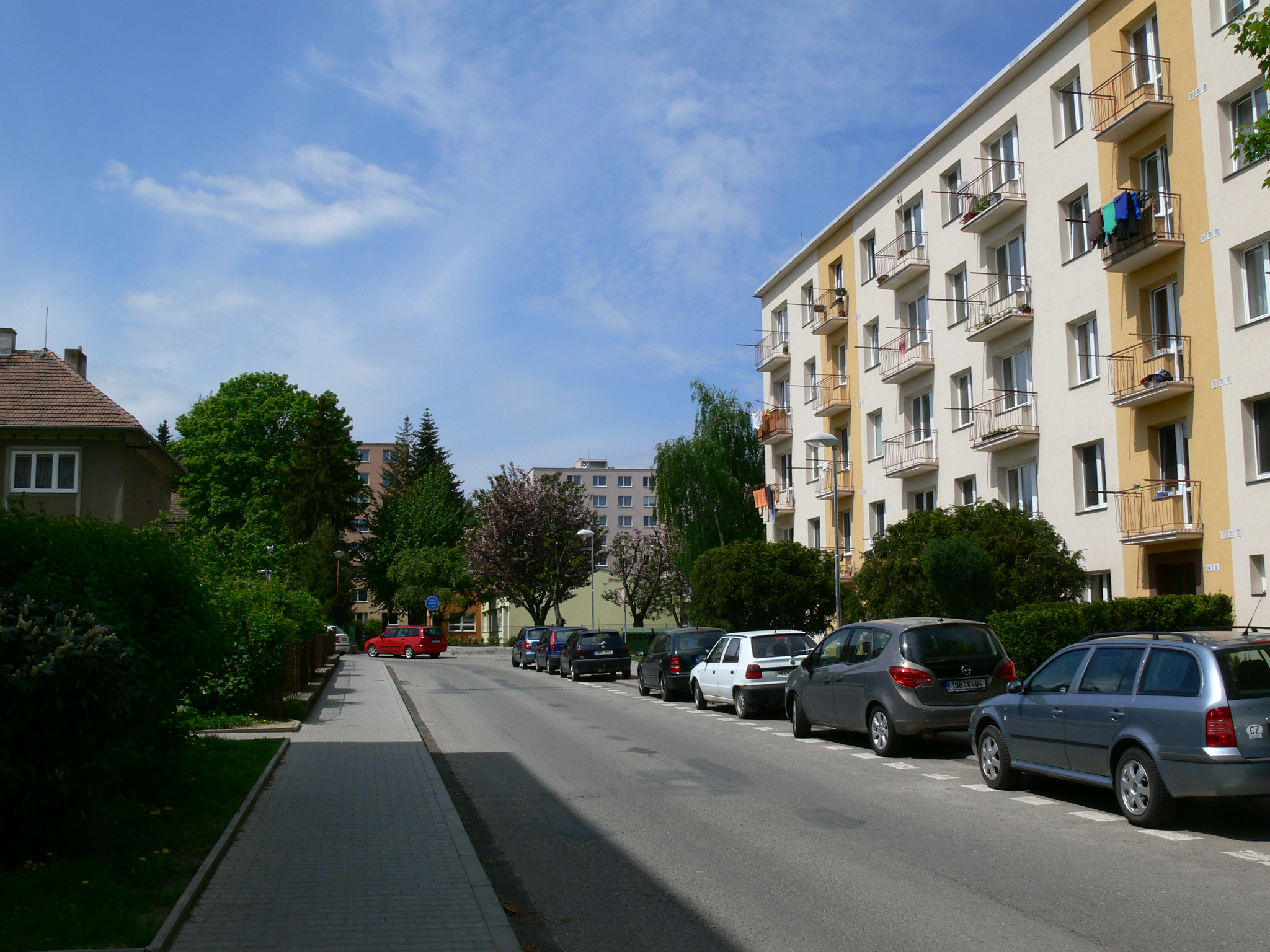
Na Hraničkách

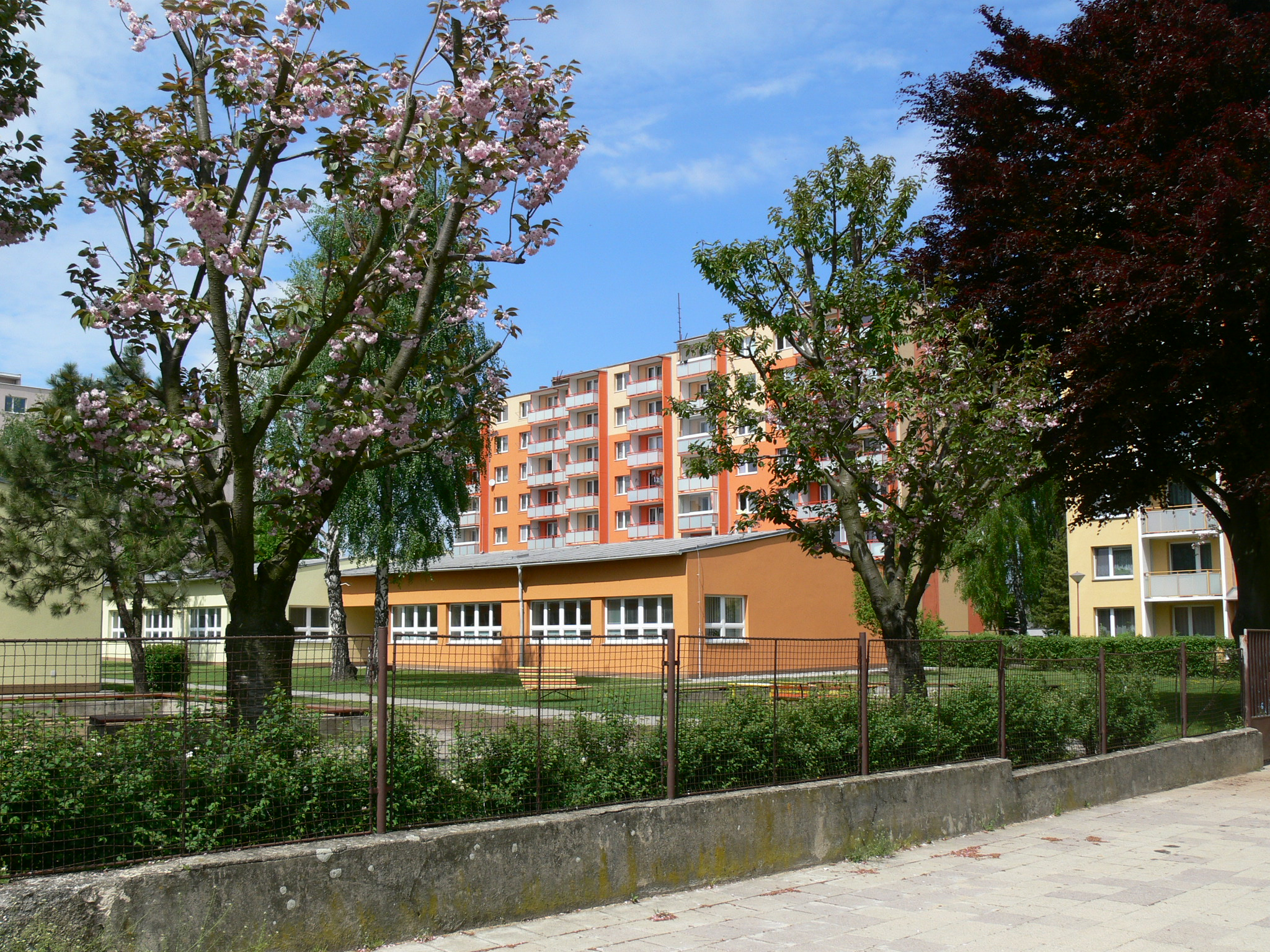
Puškinova Street

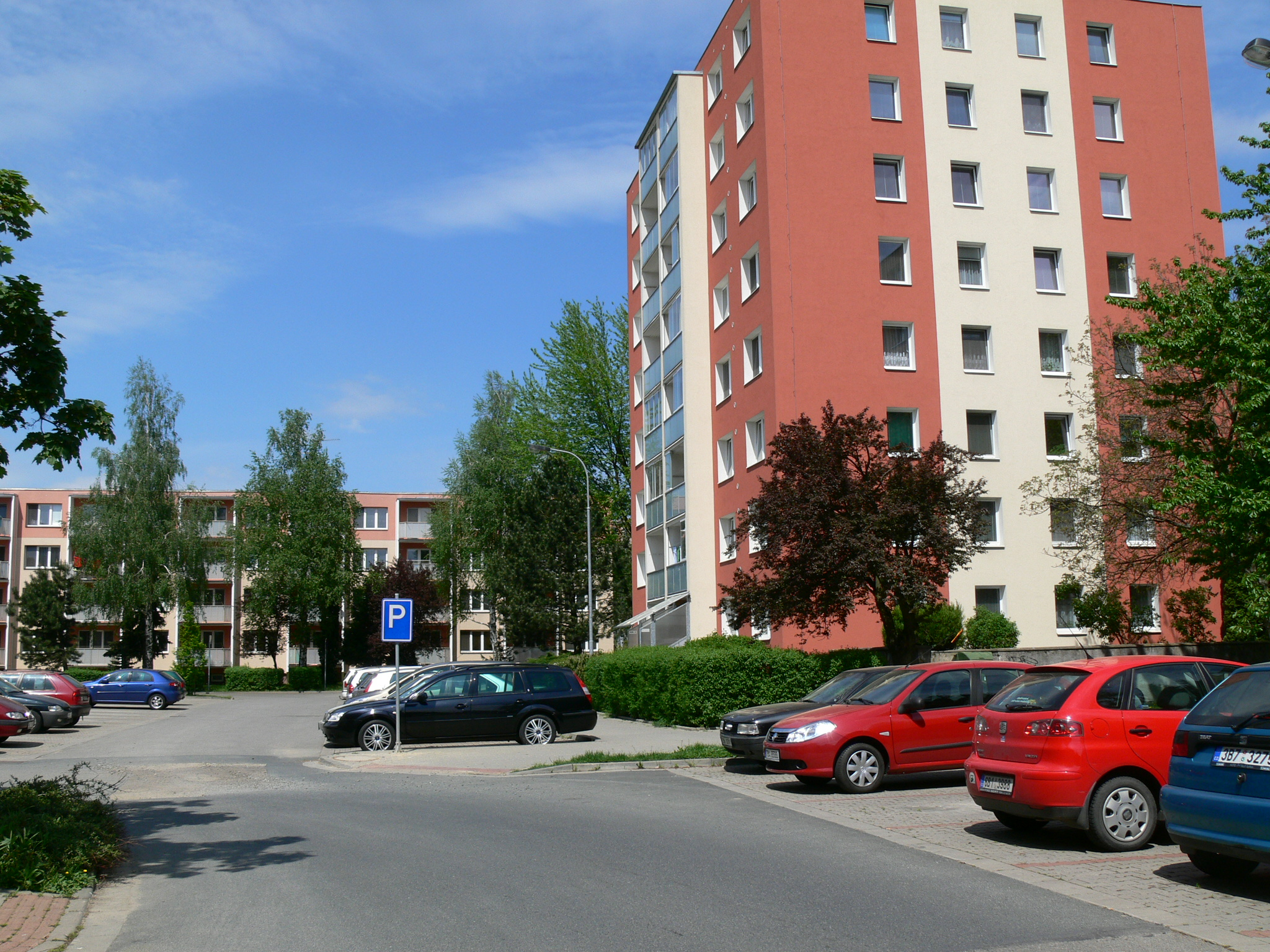
Maxima Gorkého Street

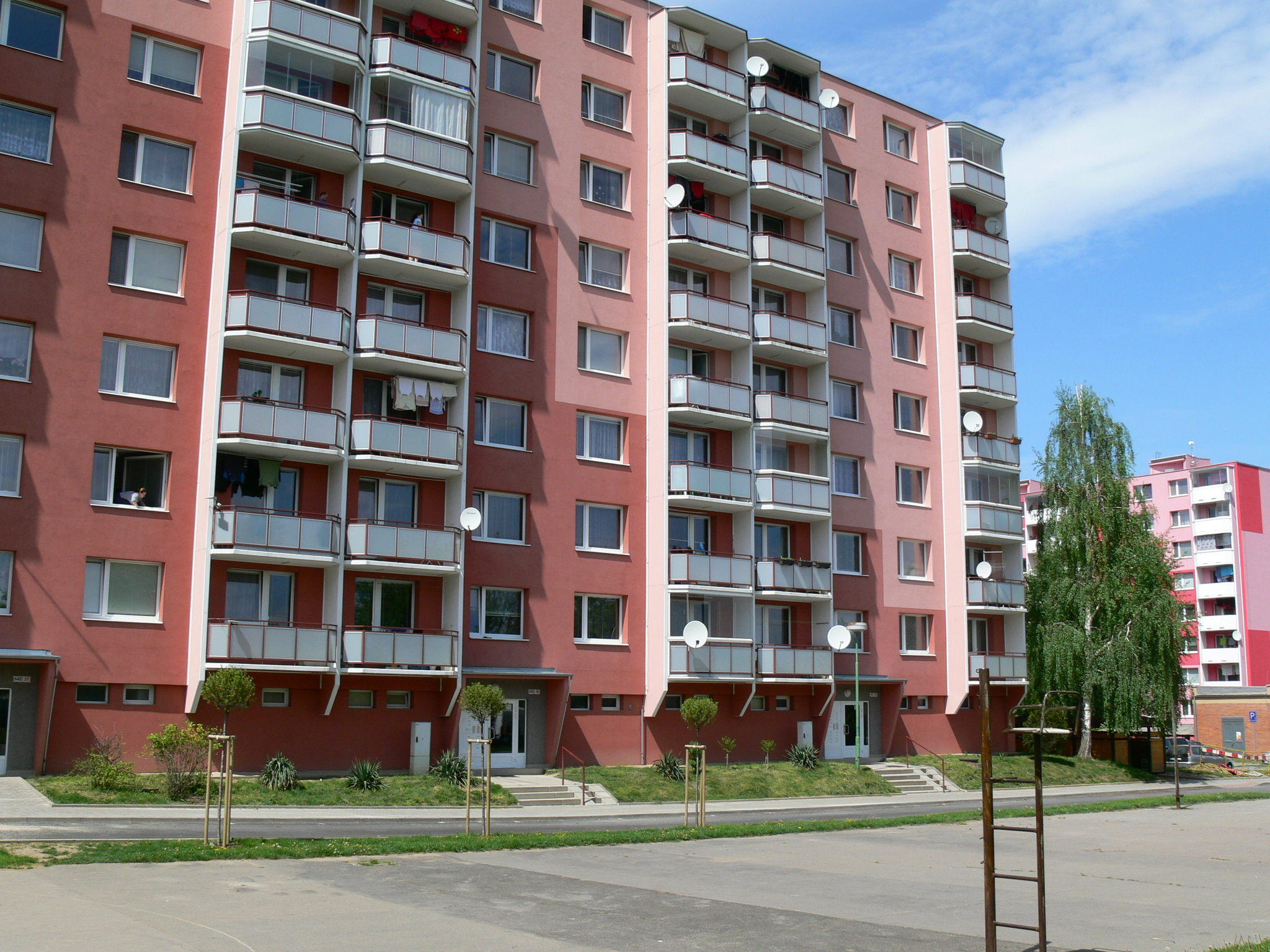
Sídliště Osvobození Street

== Coat of arms ==
The town of Dědice had a golden eight-pointed shining star in a blue field in its coat of arms. This historical coat of arms is still used. Dědice apparently accepted this star as its seal when their masters Albrecht and Petr of Šternberk confirmed the annual market to Dědice in 1371 and freed their serfs from escheat and statute labour. For the 1370s, when the town was granted privileges, the Šternberk star is documented on the painted cover of the Book of Ješek or Johnn of Šternberk from (1370) 1373–1384, the Brno series of Moravian land registers.

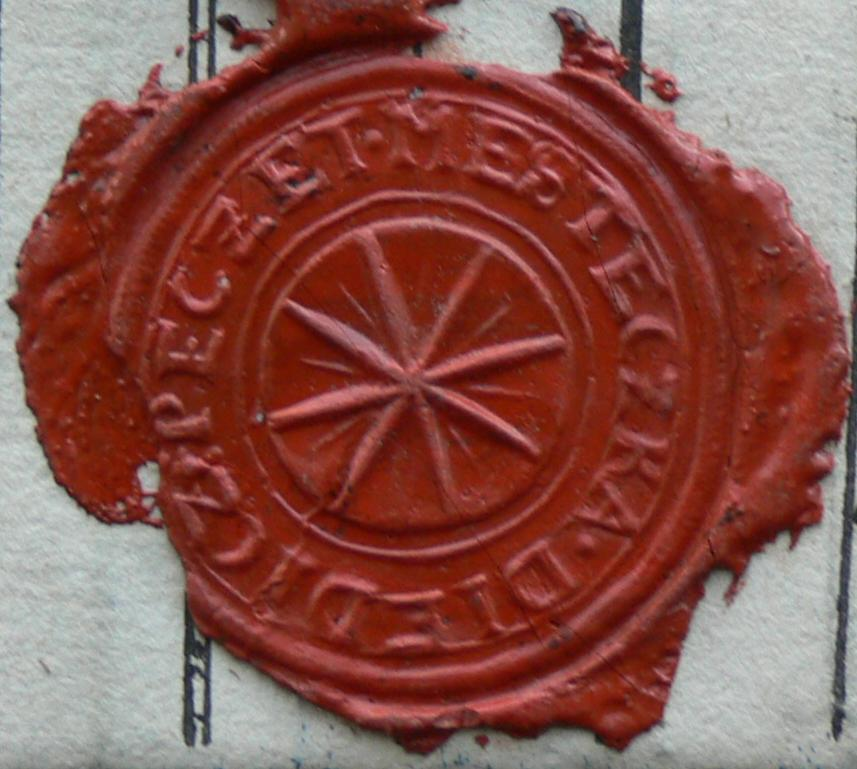
Seal of the town Dědice, eight-pointed shining star (year 1787)

While on the painted cover of the Book of Albrecht of Boskovice by the Olomouc series of Moravian land registers from 1567–1572 there is a simple eight-pointed Sternberg star, on the cover of the book by Albrecht Černohorský of Boskovice of the Brno series of Moravian land registers from the same years, the golden star in the blue field is made by the artist as shining.

As a sealing sign, this shining star is on a seal from the end of the 18th century, which has a diameter of 35 mm, which was used in the sealing of Joseph II's cadastre. Here is the seal of the town of Dědice printed in red wax. The seal is printed in a book in the cadastre of Joseph II from 1787. The seal describes: "+ Peczet mesteczka Diedicz". On the seal of the Vícoměřice part from the same year, which was printed on the same page of the book, St. John of Nepomuk on the bridge.

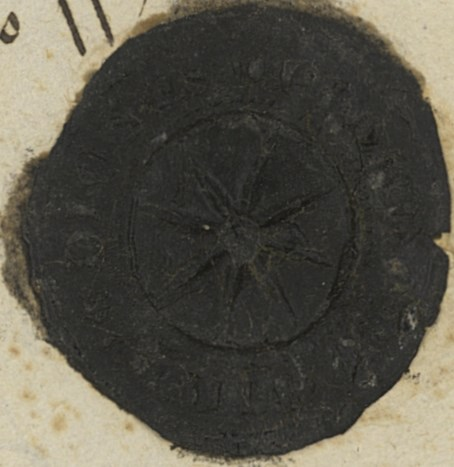
Printed seal of Dědice (year 1524)

Another seal, which has a diameter of approximately 38 mm, dates from the middle of the 18th century. In the sealing field is an oval baroque shield with an eight-pointed star set in a richly decorated cartouche. The description is illegible. It is not clear from the wrong imprint whether there are rays between the individual corners. In the sealing field of the seal of the Viceměřice part from 1734, there is a figure of St. John of Nepomuk with rays of halo around his head, with a cross in his left creased hand and a palm branch in his right, right outstretched hand. The copy written in capital letters is separated from the seal field by a thick line, on the outside by a wreath: "+ Peczet mesteczka Diedicz po stranie wiczo mierske leta 1734".

Dědice never received the sign privilege. For this reason, the preserved seals are studied when examining the history of the origin and development of the coat of arms of Dědice. On the seal of the bishop's part of Dědice near the Vyškov estate with a diameter of 26 mm, which was used in 1589, there is a shield with an eight-pointed star in the sealing field. The description separated from the sealing field by a line, separated on the outside by a wreath, is indistinct.

The Viceměřice part of Dědice probably did not have a coat of arms at all. The coat of arms of the part belonging to the Vyškov estate probably evolved from the seal of the lords of Šternberk, who were one of the heirs. The existence of the seal, which was used to seal the documents, that preceded developmentally shining eight-pointed star, which is unique among the coat of arms of other towns and villages on which the eight-pointed star is also located, is evidenced by an older imprint of a seal under a paper cover (1749), redrawn in the Book of Memories of the Town of Dědice, where other existing seals were printed for example. The star of this seal, engraved in 1686, is eight-pointed. The colors of this coat of arms are not documented. It is very likely that they were the same as the family coat of arms of the Šternberks, where the golden star is in the blue field.

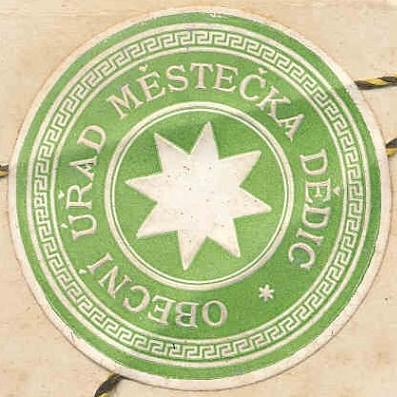
Dědice Municipal Office, paper seal (year 1905)

The coat of arms of the town of Dědice evolved from these sealing signs, and since the Šternberks had a gold eight-pointed star in their coat of arms, the coat of arms of Dědice must also be considered a gold eight-pointed star on a blue shield or a gold eight-pointed star with eight rays in the middle between as the sealing sign of Viceměřice part of Dědice did not become the coat of arms of the town. After the two parts of Dědice were merged in 1850, only the coat of arms of the part previously belonging to Vyškov estate remained in use.

At present, the oldest surviving seal can be considered the imprint from 12 January 1524. The color of the round beeswax seal is black. There is an eight-pointed star in the sealing field, and in the Latin-written description, which is located among the mother-of-pearl, it is written in Gothic capital (with an uncial): + S: OPIDAnORVm: In: DYEDICZ. In the corrigoration of the deed to which the seal is affixed, it states: "A protož my purgmistr a rada svrchupsaní ... rozkázali sme k tomuto listu svú pečeť vlastní městečka našeho přitisknúti nám bez škody i všem budúcím potomkom našim."

On the stamps of the municipal office of town Dědice from the second half of the 19th century and the first half of the 20th century, we meet a simple eight-pointed star. The typography, evidenced by a seal in the Joseph II's cadastre from 1787 with a shining eight-pointed star, was also used in important documents in the 19th century. The description of the paper seal from the beginning of the 20th century states: "Municipal office of the town of Dědice". The color of the paper seal used in the workbook mimics the color of the green wax used by medieval towns. The eight-pointed star is not made shining here. The star and the text of the description are white.

=== Star of Bethlehem ===
Heraldic flag of Dědice (unofficial) based on the coat of arms: in a blue leaf a yellow shining eight-pointed star

The eight-pointed star came to the coat of arms of the town of Dědice under the influence of the Šternberk coat of arms, and then in the 18th century unique rays of glow were added to it (in the heraldry of the Czech lands), which made it a shining eight-pointed star.

The Šternberks are the only family of manorial standing in our country that has long been ruled. In accordance with the old family legend, the Šternberks derive their origin from Kaspar, who was one of the three biblical kings who came to Bethlehem to worship the born Christkind. The name Kašpar is popular in the family.

The Šternberk romantic coat of arms legend was subsequently restored and nourished especially in the 19th century in connection with manuscript battles. The three kings (or rather sages) first appear in the Gospel of Matthew, but are not mentioned by name. The names of these sages Kaspar, Melichar and Baltazar appeared only later (the abbreviation C + M + B + originally meant "Christus mansionem benedicat", "may Christ bless this abode."

The Golden Star in the Šternberk coat of arms is therefore the Star of Bethlehem. The family motto "Nescit occasum" is attached to it, meaning that this star "Does not know the set" or "Never sets". The star of Bethlehem shone and led the king (sage). This symbolism creates a connection with the unique rays of the star of Dědice.

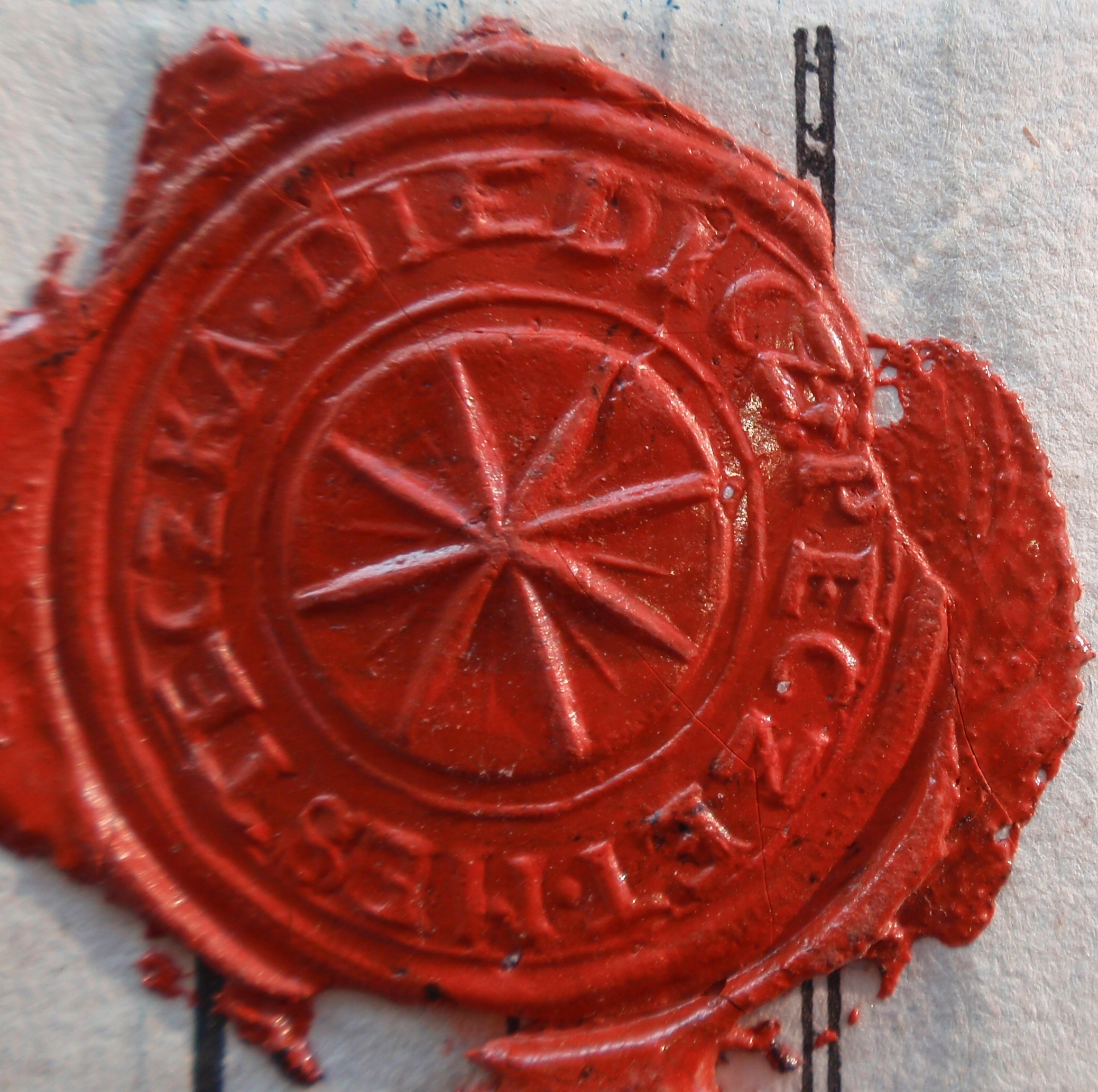
Seal of the Town of Dědice (1787)

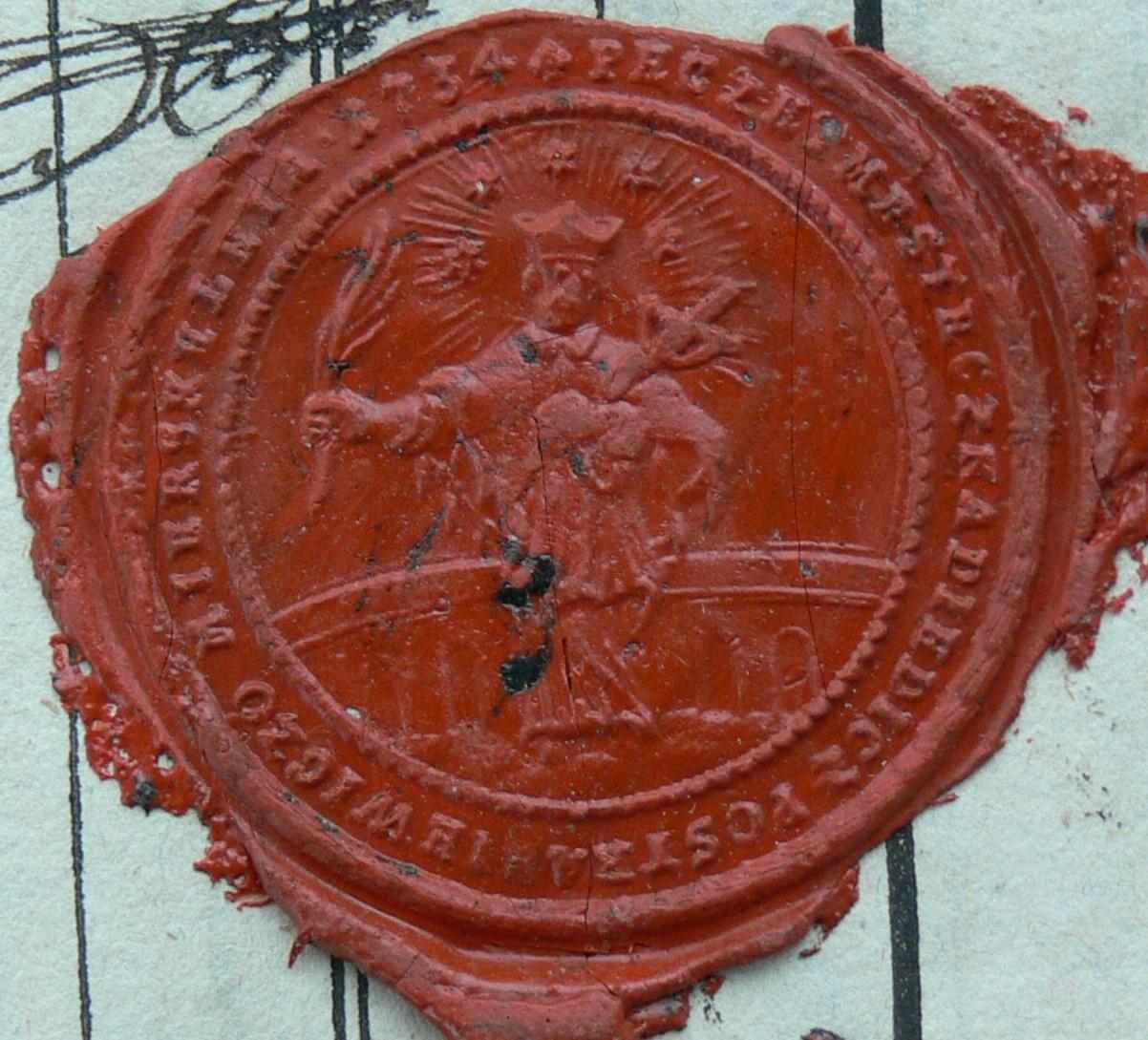
The seal of the Viceměřice part of the town of Dědice. In the description the year 1734

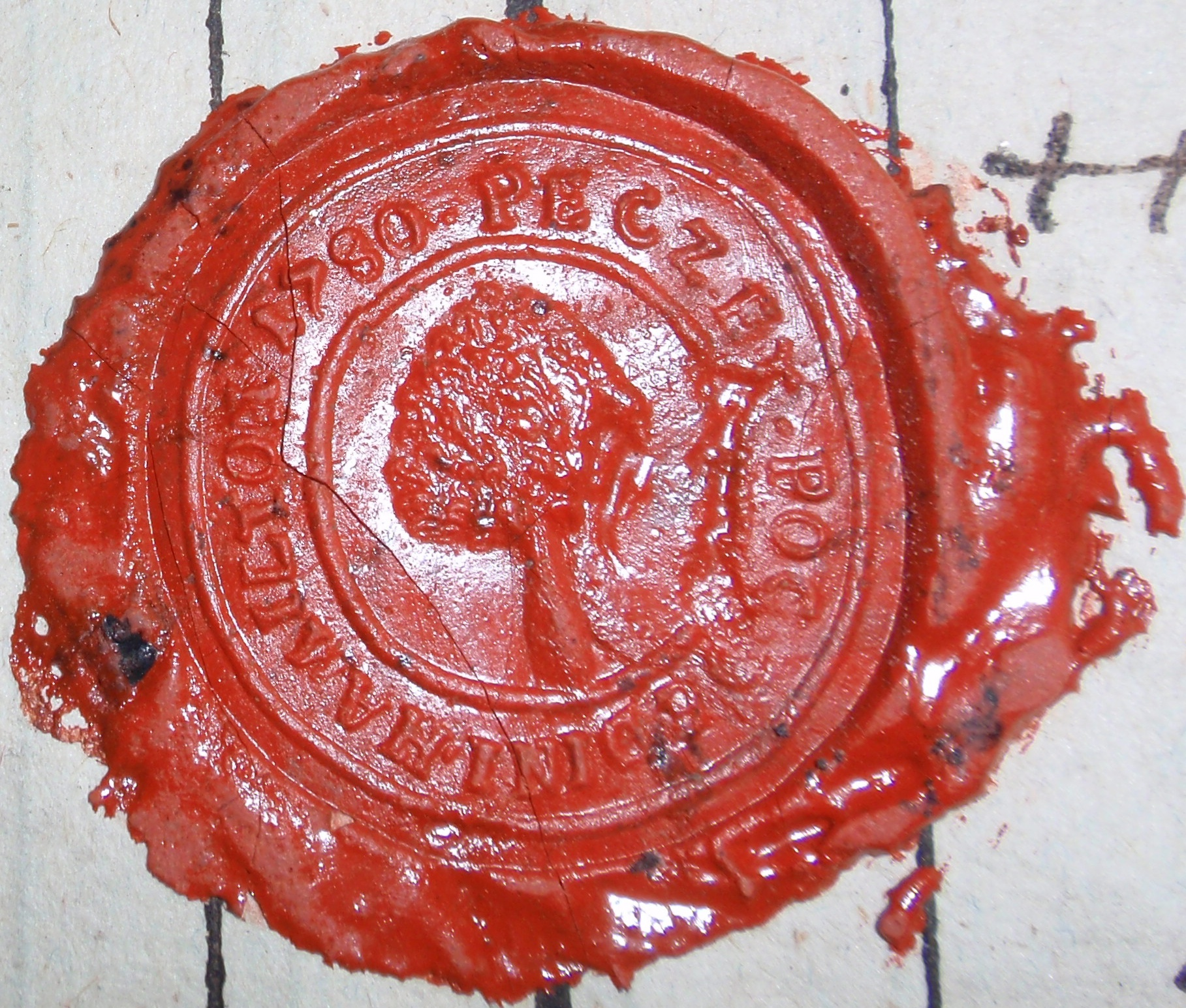
Hamiltony seal. In the description the year 1780

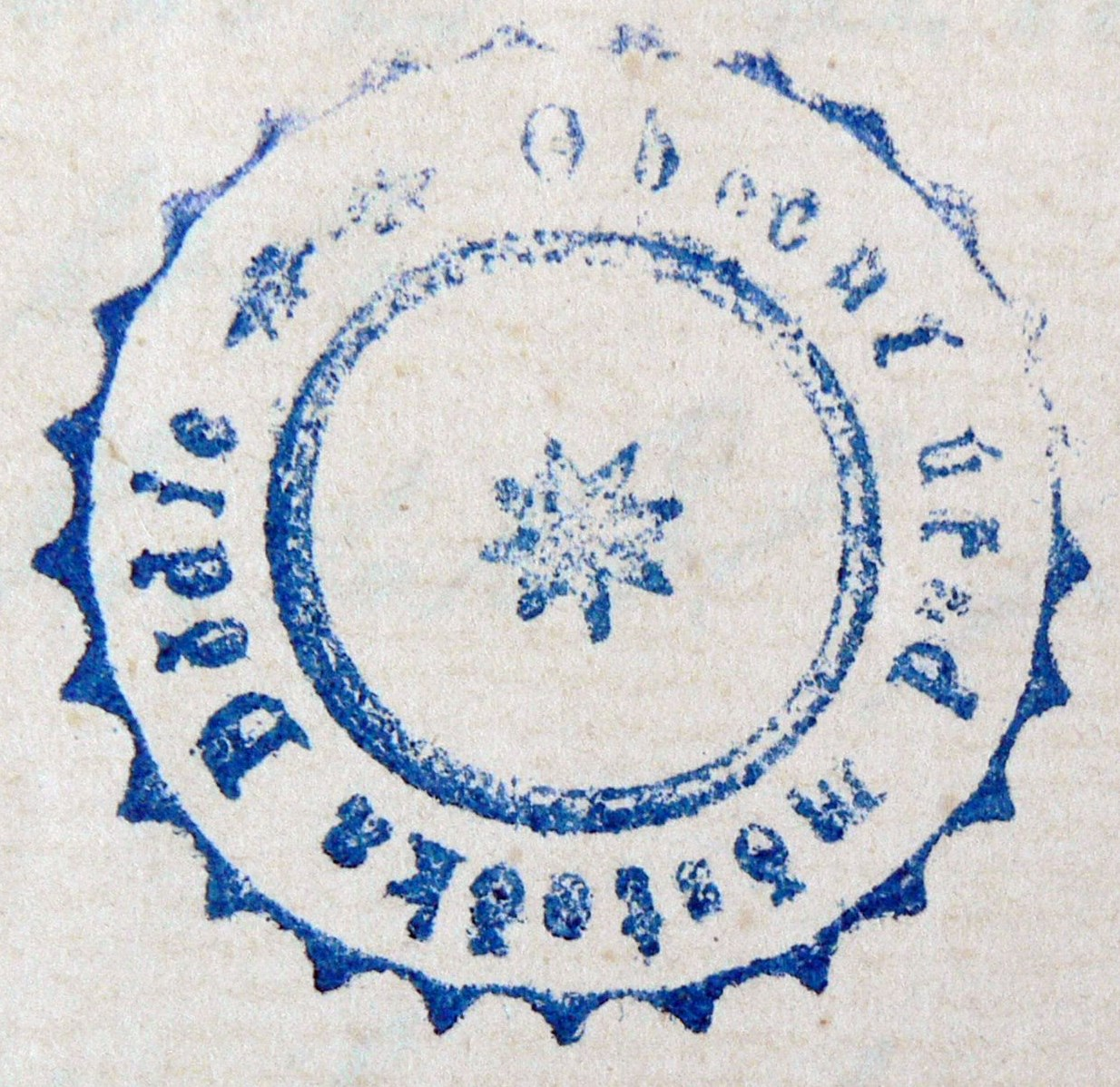
Stamp. Dědice Municipal Office (year 1887)

=== Badge ===
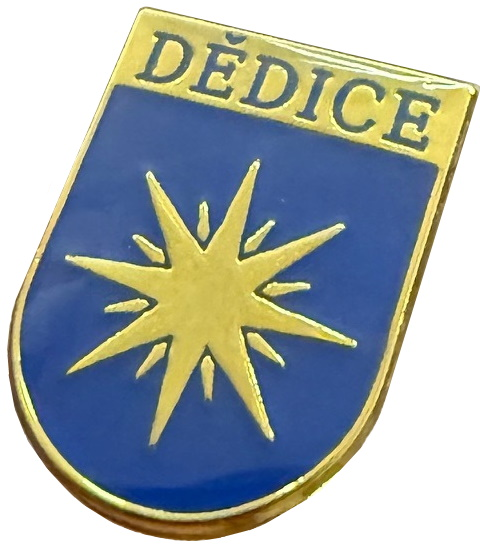
Badge Dědice

In November 2024, a badge with the Dědice coat of arms was created. A shining eight-pointed star made of protruding gold metal with blue filling is stamped across the entire surface with blue recessed and filled gaps between the long and short rays. The inscription Dědice, whose serif letters are cast in blue in the upper gold metal band, is located at the top of the lacquered pin badge.

== Landmarks ==
The coat of arms of Dědice. Golden eight-pointed shining star in a blue field

- Church of the Holy Trinity Church (listed since 1958)
- Statue of the crucified Christ in front of the church
- Statues of patrons of Moravia and the whole of Europe Cyril and Methodius (1901) and St. John of Nepomuk (1826) next to the church
- Statue of the crucified Christ (crucifix) in Padouchy
- Statue of St. John of Nepomuk in Padouchy, Kopřivova street
- Statue of the crucified Christ (crucifix) on Palackého Street from 1881
- Klement Gottwald's birth house in Revoluční Street. Klement Gottwald's "birth room" is cited as an example of a communist pilgrimage site often visited during the Czechoslovak Socialist Republic (ČSSR). Next to it is an extension from the 80s, later used as a museum exhibition hall. The birth house was protected as a monument on 3 May 1958. Protection was revoked by Government Decree No. 112/1991 Coll.
- Statue of the crucified Christ from 1890 in Pazderna (crucifix reconstructed in 2016)
- A statue of the crucified Christ next to the road to Vyškov, Dědická Street, near the Osvobození housing estate
- Statue of Statue of the Virgin Mary with Jesus - "on František", in the field above Revoluční and A. B. Svojsíka streets
- Old mill

== Literature ==
- Bistřický, Jan (1998). Zdíkovy listiny, In: Český časopis historický. pp. 292–306. ISSN 0862-6111.
- Janák, Vratislav (1994). Sídliště lidu s moravskou malovanou keramikou ve Vyškově - dědické cihelně a počátky mladšího lengyelského stupně na Moravě a ve Slezsku, In: Pravěk 2, 1992 (in Czech). Brno. pp. 105–130.
- Jan, Libor (2009). Milota z Dědic. Zpráva o věrné službě a mýtu o zradě, In: Campana codex civitas. Miroslao Flodr octogenario (in Czech). Brno: Archiv města Brna. pp. 248–265.
- Kotulán, Vladimír (2003). Vyškovská zastavení. Vyškov: Město Vyškov. p. 94. ISBN 80-239-3257-8.
- Mleziva, Štěpán; Kuča, Karel (2006). Historický lexikon městysů a měst, Vývoj postavení a funkce městských sídel v dějinách územněsprávního členění českých zemí od roku 1850 do současnosti. Prague: Nakladatelství Miloš Uhlíř - Baset.
- Franěk, Otakar; Stránský, Zdeněk (1978). Památník Klementa Gottwalda v Dědicích. Brno.
- Vyškov. Dějiny města. Vyškov: Město Vyškov. 2016. p. 944. ISBN 978-80-906656-0-6.
