= Jelínek =

Jelínek (feminine: Jelínková) is a Czech surname that means "little deer". Notable people include:

- Adriana Jelínková (born 1995), Czech alpine ski racer
- Antonín Jelínek (born 1956), Czech wrestler
- Arthur J. Jelinek (1928–2022), American anthropologist
- Bohumil Jelínek, Czech football player
- David Jelínek (born 1990), Czech basketball player
- Dora Jelínková (1949–2007), Czech volleyball player
- Elfriede Jelinek (born 1946), Austrian writer
- Ellen Marianne Mattson Jelinek (born 1973), Swedish actress
- Eloise Jelinek (1924–2007), American linguist
- František Cína Jelínek (1882–1961), Czech painter
- Frederick Jelinek (1932–2010), American information theorist
- Hanns Jelinek (1901–1969), Austrian composer
- Jan Jelinek (born 1949), German musician
- Jan Jelínek (legionary) (1893–1974), Czech writer
- Jiří Jelínek (ballet dancer) (born 1977), Czech ballet dancer
- Jiří Jelínek (trumpeter) (1922–1984), Czech musician
- Josef Jelínek (1941–2024), Czech football player
- Josef Jelínek (footballer, born 1902) (1902–1973), Czech football player
- Joseph R. Jelinek (1919–1978), American general
- Karina Jelinek (born 1981), Argentine model and actress
- Karl Jelinek (1822–1876), Austrian physicist and meteorologist
- Maria Jelinek (born 1942), Canadian skater
- Mariann Jelinek (born 1942), American organizational theorist
- Mercedes Jelinek (born 1985), American photographer
- Milena Jelinek (1935–2020), Czech-American writer
- Otto Jelinek (1940–2026), Czech-born Canadian figure skater, politician and diplomat
- Pavel Jelínek (born 1972), Czech physicist
- Petr Jelínek (born 1984), Czech ice hockey player
- Robert Jelinek (born 1969), Swedish actor
- Ron Jelinek (born 1945), American politician
- Šárka Jelínková (born 1968), Czech politician
- Tomáš Jelínek (born 1962), Czech ice hockey player
- W. Craig Jelinek (born 1952), American businessman
- Václav Jelínek (1944–2022), Czechoslovak spy
- Vladislav Jelínek, Czech football player
- Wilhelm Jelinek (born 1994), Austrian handball player
- Žuži Jelinek (1920–2016), Croatian writer

== See also ==
- Jellinek
