= Litterer =

Litterer is a surname. Notable people with the surname include:

- Joseph A. Litterer (1926–1995), American organizational theorist and professor
- William Litterer (1834–1917), American politician
- Steve, Tom, Dave, and Carleen Litterer, founding members of the band Litterer
