= Pařezovice =

- Municipal part of Vyškov
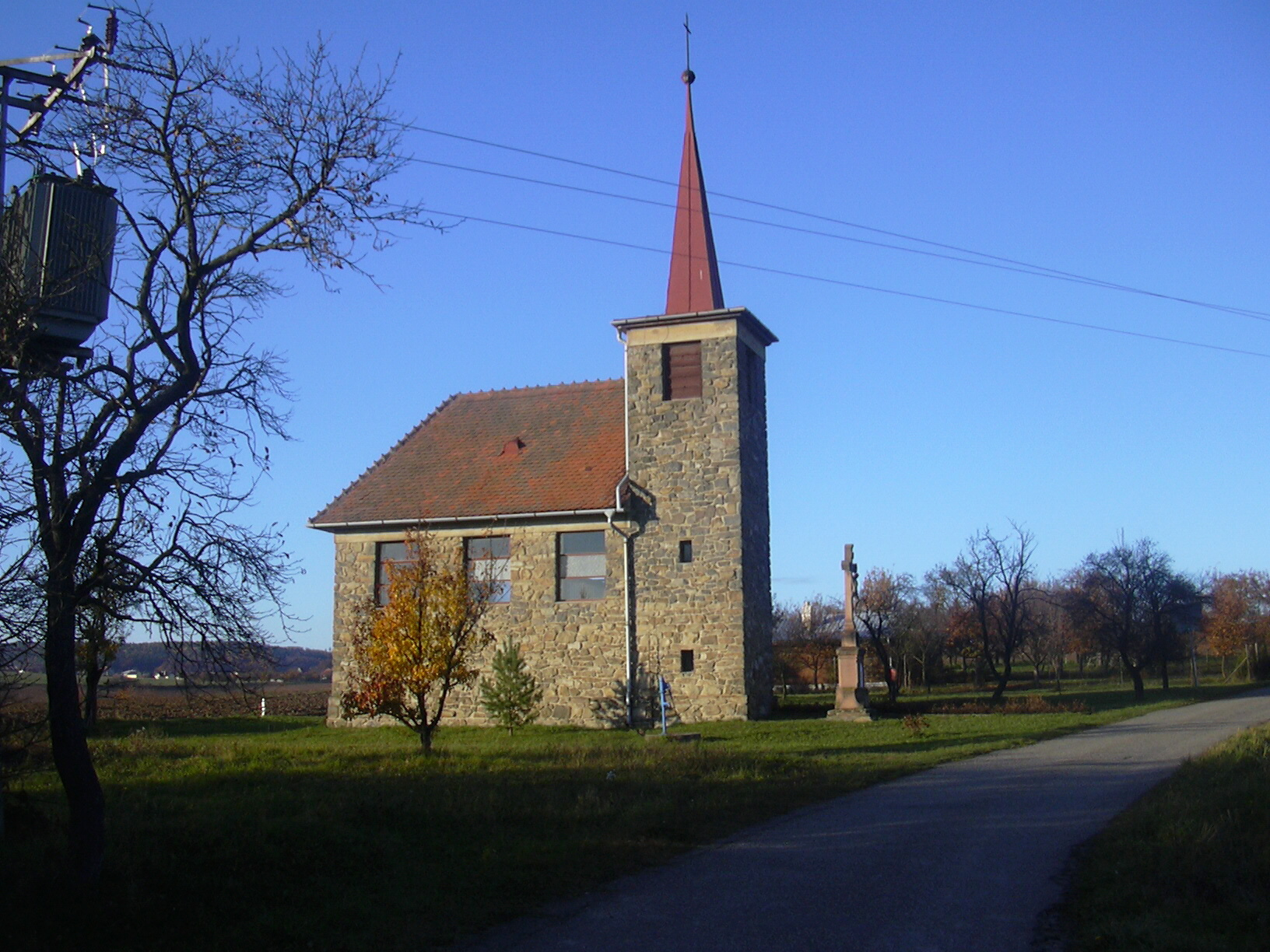
- Stone chapel in Pařezovice
- Interactive map of Pařezovice
- Country: Czech Republic
- Region: South Moravian Region
- District: Vyškov
- Municipality: Vyškov

Area
  - Total: 0.59 km^{2} (0.23 sq mi)

Population (2021)
  - Total: 35
  - Density: 59/km^{2} (150/sq mi)
- Time zone: UTC+1 (CET)
  - Summer (DST): UTC+2 (CEST)
- Postal code: 682 01

Pařezovice (German: Parschesowitz) is a village and municipal part of Vyškov, a town in Vyškov District of the South Moravian Region of the Czech Republic. Cadastrally, it lies in Lhota. It has about 40 inhabitants.

It is located 7 kilometres (4.3 mi) northwest of Vyškov and 27 kilometres (17 mi) from Brno.

== History ==
Pařezovice was founded in 1766 on the site of a cut-down forest.

During the German occupation in 1941, the inhabitants of 33 municipalities were evicted from the Drahany Highlands, including Pařezovice.

The village was merged with Lhota and in 1964 with Rychtářov. All of the three settlements later became part of Vyškov.

== Demographics ==
Historical population

Year	Pop.	±%
1869	213	—
1880	219	+2.8%
1890	221	+0.9%
1900	244	+10.4%
1910	241	−1.2%

Year	Pop.	±%
1921	217	−10.0%
1930	218	+0.5%
1950	73	−66.5%
1961	92	+26.0%
1970	76	−17.4%

Year	Pop.	±%
1980	62	−18.4%
1991	49	−21.0%
2001	35	−28.6%
2011	37	+5.7%
2021	35	−5.4%

Source: Censuses

== Monuments ==
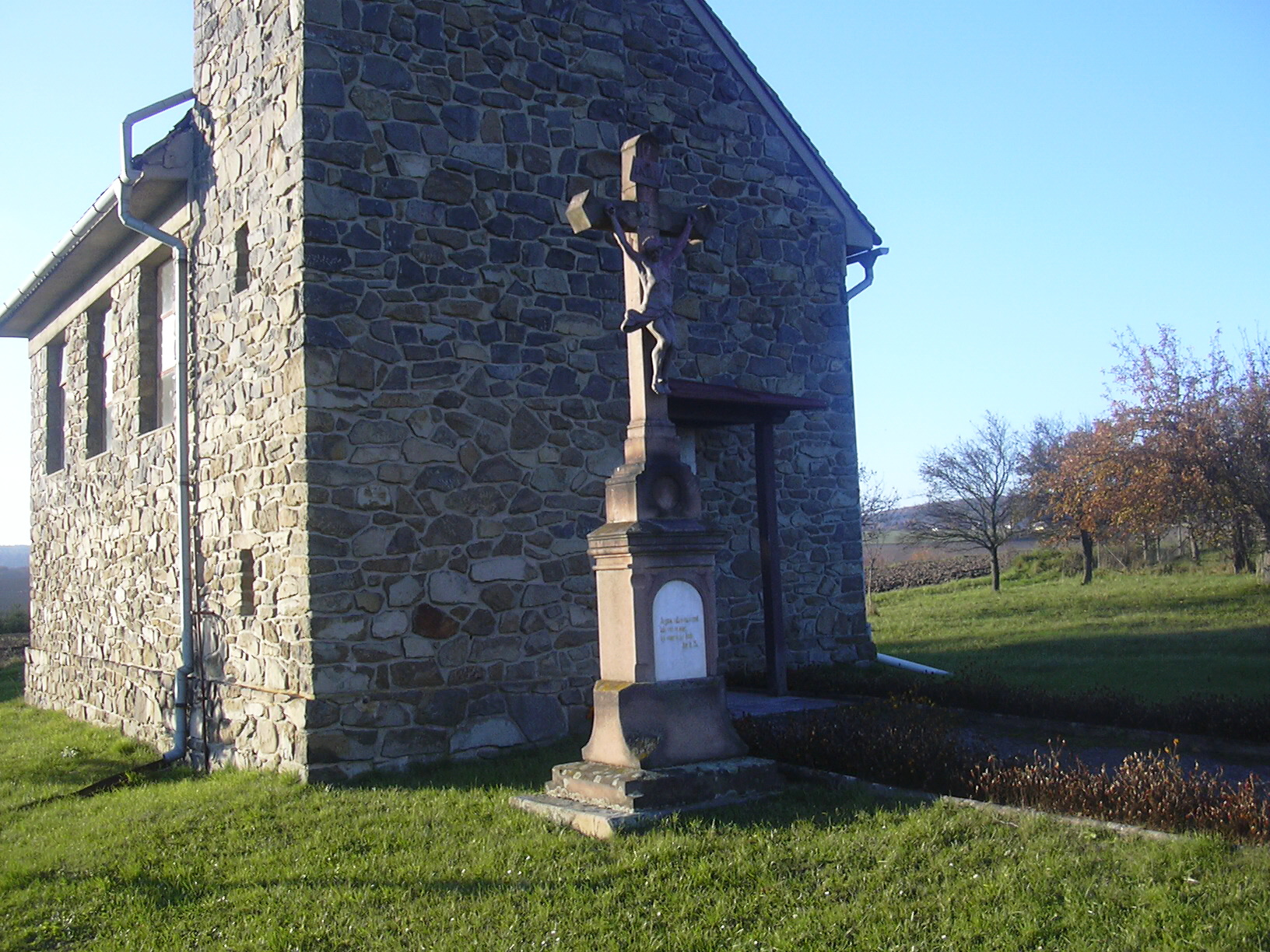
The chapel and cross

- Stone chapel built in memory of its founders Marie and Antonie Lusková
- Stone cross in front of the chapel
