= Nouzka =

- Municipal part of Vyškov
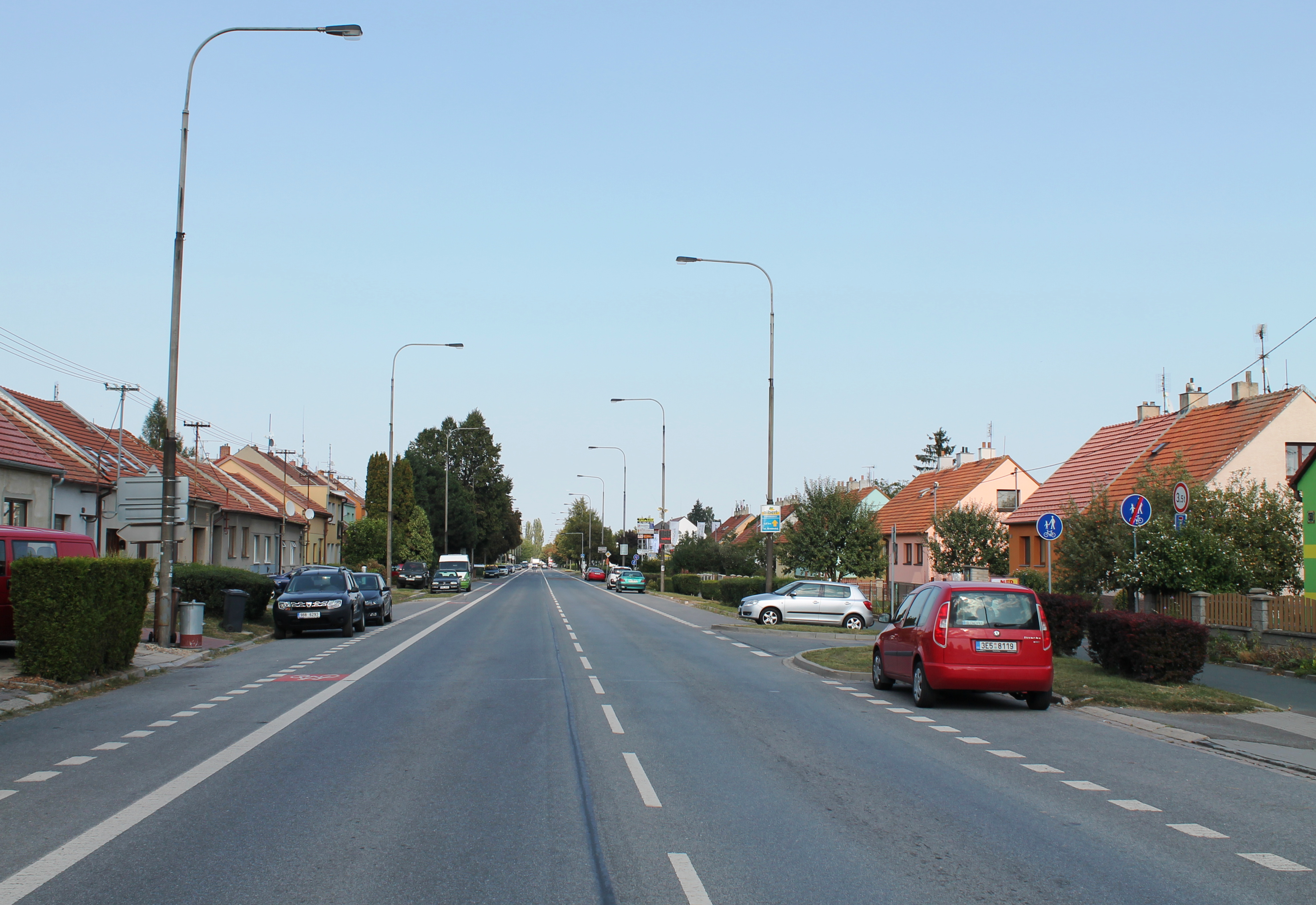
- Brněnská street in Nouzka

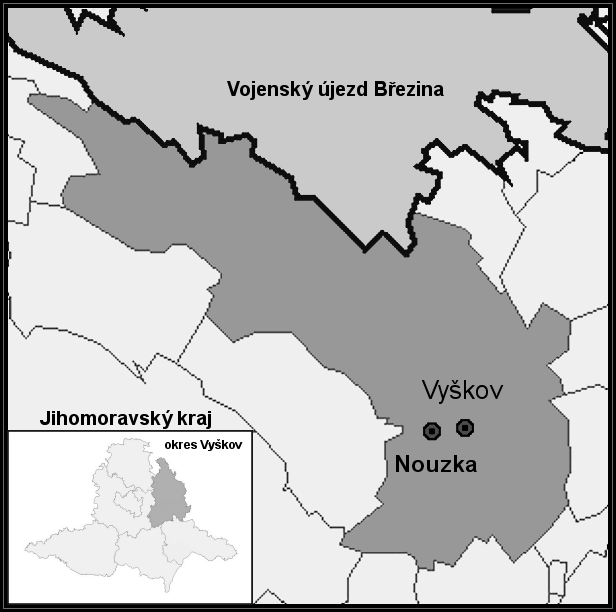
- Location of Nouzka in Vyškov; 49°15′59″N 16°59′8″E
- Country: Czech Republic
- Region: South Moravian Region
- District: Vyškov
- Municipality: Vyškov

Area
  - Total: 0.29 km^{2} (0.11 sq mi)

Population (2021)
  - Total: 338
  - Density: 1,200/km^{2} (3,000/sq mi)
- Time zone: UTC+1 (CET)
  - Summer (DST): UTC+2 (CEST)
- Postal code: 682 01

Nouzka (German: Mels) is a village and municipal part of Vyškov, a town in Vyškov District of the South Moravian Region of the Czech Republic. It consists of a row of houses in a street-like development along the road II/430 to Brno on Brněnská street. It has about 340 inhabitants.

It is located 1 kilometre (0.62 mi) southwest of Vyškov and 29 kilometres (18 mi) from Brno.

== History ==
Nouzka was founded in 1789 by the parcelling of the Vyškov manor, which belonged to the Vyškov estate. It later became part of the village of Nosálovice, now part of Vyškov since 1949.

An industrial zone was created in Nouzka in the early 1990s, and was finished in 2007. There is a civic organization in Nouzka since 2013.

== Demographics ==
Historical population

Year	Pop.	±%
1869	142	—
1880	109	−23.2%
1890	112	+2.8%
1900	137	+22.3%
1910	247	+80.3%

Year	Pop.	±%
1921	446	+80.6%
1930	434	−2.7%
1950	376	−13.4%
1961	368	−2.1%
1970	362	−1.6%

Year	Pop.	±%
1980	421	+16.3%
1991	370	−12.1%
2001	340	−8.1%
2011	338	−0.6%
2021	338	+0.0%

Source: Censuses
