= Brňany (Vyškov) =

- Municipal part of Vyškov
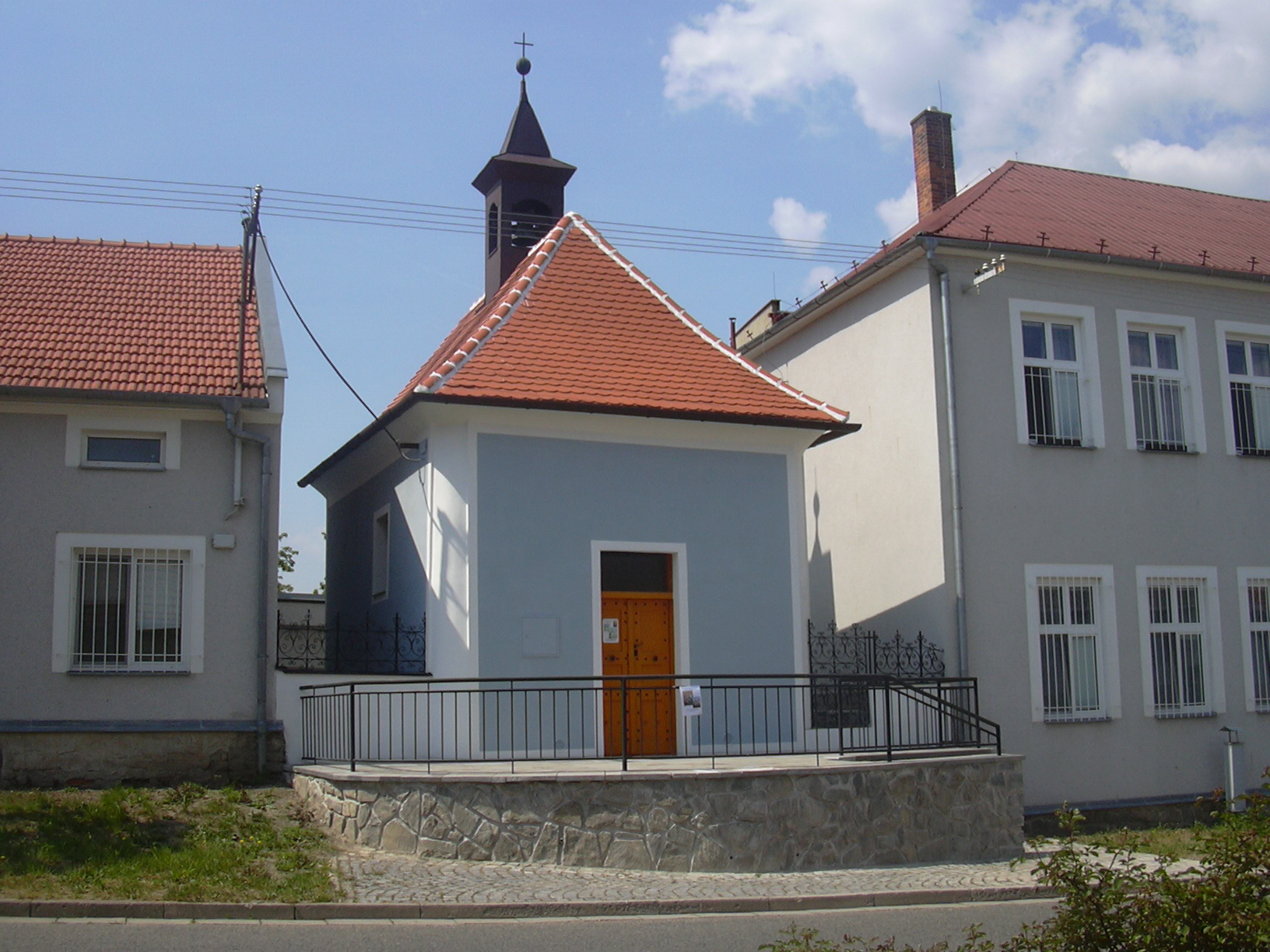
- Chapel of St. Michael
- Interactive map of Brňany
- Country: Czech Republic
- Region: South Moravian Region
- District: Vyškov
- Municipality: Vyškov

Area
  - Total: 9.69 km^{2} (3.74 sq mi)

Population (2021)
  - Total: 1,744
  - Density: 180/km^{2} (466/sq mi)
- Time zone: UTC+1 (CET)
  - Summer (DST): UTC+2 (CEST)
- Postal code: 682 01

Brňany (German: Bründlitz) is a village and municipal part of Vyškov, a town in Vyškov District of the South Moravian Region of the Czech Republic. It has about 1,700 inhabitants.

It is located approximately 0.5 kilometres (0.31 mi) southeast of Vyškov and 30 kilometres (19 mi) east of Brno, on the road to Bučovice.

== Etymology ==
The name of the village is derived from the original name of its inhabitants, Brňané. Its meaning was "people inhabiting brní", brní being an old word for a muddy place. Theoretically, the name of the inhabitants could also mean 'people who came from Brno'. Since Brno is located in an old settlement area, in which the names of the settlements are derived from ancient words, the first interpretation is more likely.

== History ==
One of the first mentions of Brňany (Brennan, Brunnaz) is from 1267, when bishop Bruno von Schauenburg bought 11 lans from Radslav of Želč. In 1277, the bishop granted this village as a fief to Dětřich Stange, except for the pond and the mill, which he kept.

According to the urbarium, in 1450 there were two ponds in Brňany, an upper and lower one. The lower pond was founded by Bishop Paul from Miličín, there were two fish boxes under the pond. However, not a single one has survived to the present day, they disappeared at the turn of the 18th and 19th centuries.

Brňany became part of Vyškov in 1950.

== Demographics ==
Historical population

| Year | Pop. | ±% |
|---|---|---|
| 1869 | 515 | — |
| 1880 | 526 | +2.1% |
| 1890 | 506 | −3.8% |
| 1900 | 508 | +0.4% |
| 1910 | 598 | +17.7% |

| Year | Pop. | ±% |
|---|---|---|
| 1921 | 620 | +3.7% |
| 1930 | 543 | −12.4% |
| 1950 | 555 | +2.2% |
| 1961 | 560 | +0.9% |
| 1970 | 452 | −19.3% |

| Year | Pop. | ±% |
|---|---|---|
| 1980 | 1,810 | +300.4% |
| 1991 | 2,170 | +19.9% |
| 2001 | 2,162 | −0.4% |
| 2011 | 1,965 | −9.1% |
| 2021 | 1,744 | −11.2% |

Source: Censuses

== Monuments ==
- The Chapel of St. Michael stands on the site of a former parish church from the 14th and 15th centuries, where burials were held until 1789. This parish church was demolished in 1806. The chapel acquired its current appearance in 2006 after a complete reconstruction of the building.
- Relief of the Crucified Christ In the upper part of the former village, on house no. 26, there is a relief of the Crucified Christ with the year 1636. It is prismatic in shape, 50 centimetres (20 in) high, 32 centimetres (13 in) wide, and 30-40 centimeters (11-15 in) deep. Previously, this relief was placed on a four-sided prismatic pedestal, alone near the house. In 1927, it was removed and set into the wall of the house. It apparently stood on the burial site of victims of the plague or cholera. It is very likely that this relief, standing near the place called Na sakrovci, built in the form of a column shrine, is a reminder of a terrible epidemic.
- A stone cross at the crossroads in front of the restaurant Letiště U Kopinců dedicated to those who died in World War I from 1924.
- Stone cross in front of the local social care institute for adults.
