= Křečkovice =

- Municipal part of Vyškov
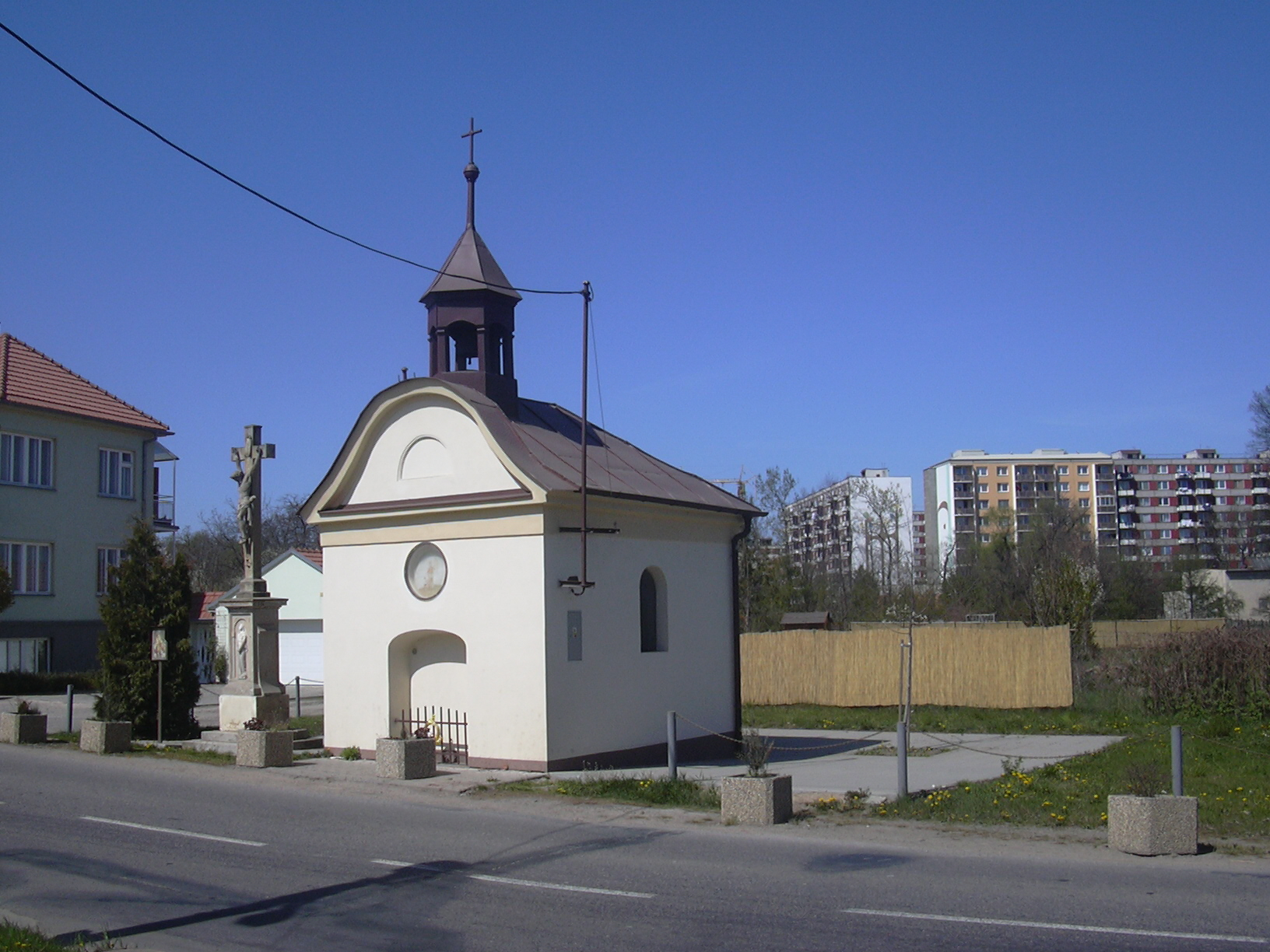
- Chapel in Křečkovice
- Interactive map of Křečkovice
- Country: Czech Republic
- Region: South Moravian Region
- District: Vyškov
- Municipality: Vyškov

Area
  - Total: 0.46 km^{2} (0.18 sq mi)

Population (2021)
  - Total: 1,111
  - Density: 2,400/km^{2} (6,300/sq mi)
- Time zone: UTC+1 (CET)
  - Summer (DST): UTC+2 (CEST)
- Postal code: 682 01

Křečkovice is a village and municipal part of the town of Vyškov in Vyškov District of the South Moravian Region of the Czech Republic. Located approximately 1 kilometre (1 mi) east of Vyškov and 30 kilometres (19 mi) northeast of Brno, it lies at an altitude of 240 m above sea level. It has about 1,100 inhabitants.

== History ==
The village of Křečkovice is first mentioned in 1388, when a fiefdom belonging to a certain Vilém is mentioned for the first time. From the 14th century, Křečkovice belonged to the Bishopric of Olomouc. From 1609, there was a parish church in the village, which disappeared during the Thirty Years' War. In 1700, the inhabitants of Křečkovice clashed with the inhabitants of Brňany over the disputed grove of Březina.

Originally its own municipality, Křečkovice became part of Vyškov in 1950.

== Demographics ==
Historical population

Year	Pop.	±%
1869	347	—
1880	354	+2.0%
1890	378	+6.8%
1900	468	+23.8%
1910	455	−2.8%

Year	Pop.	±%
1921	462	+1.5%
1930	426	−7.8%
1950	368	−13.6%
1961	350	−4.9%
1970	366	+4.6%

Year	Pop.	±%
1980	655	+79.0%
1991	1,196	+82.6%
2001	1,052	−12.0%
2011	1,132	+7.6%
2021	1,111	−1.9%

Source: Censuses

== Monuments ==
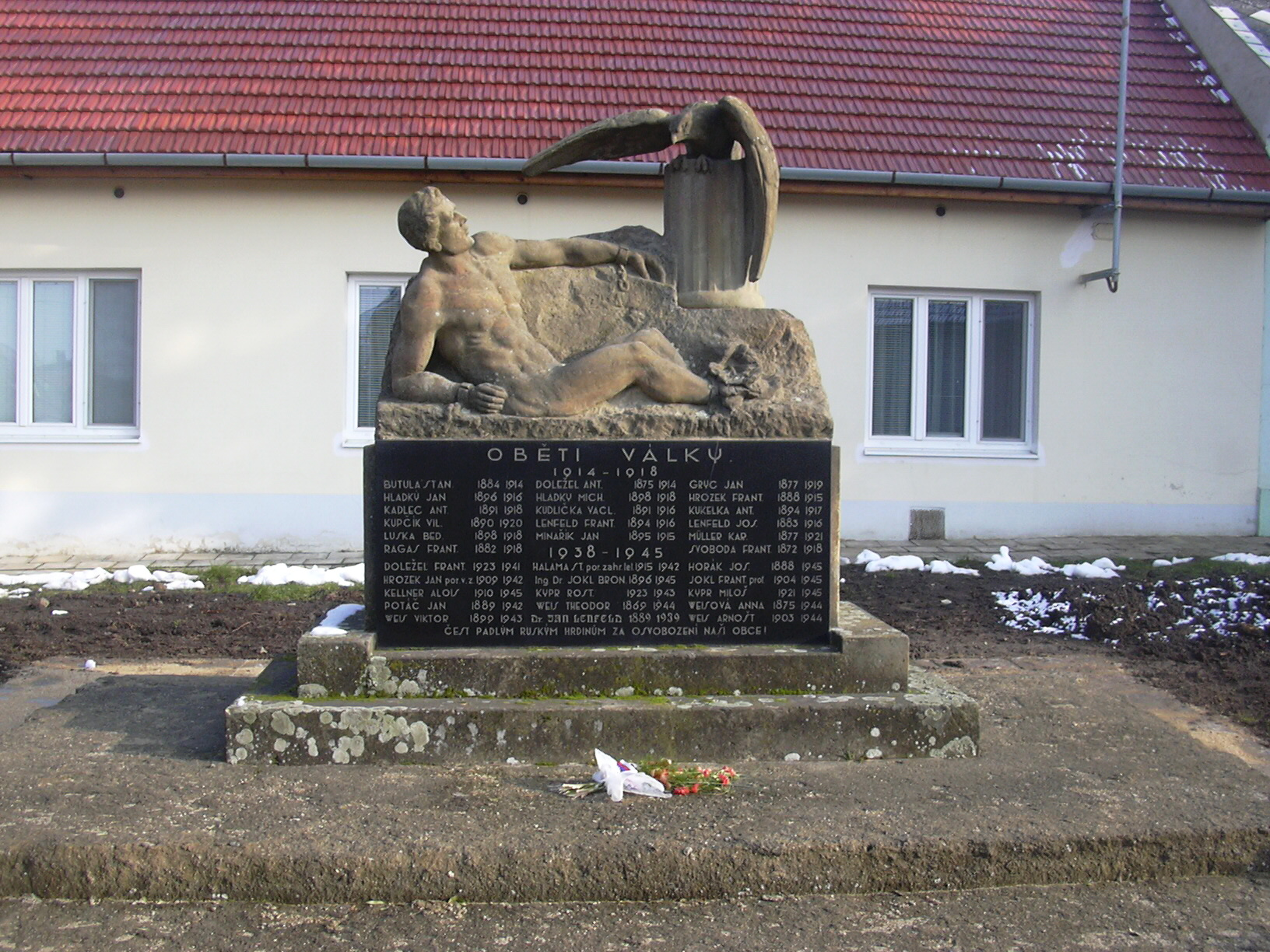
Monument to the victims of both world wars

- Chapel of St. Václav
- Stone cross in front of the chapel
- Monument to the victims of World War I and World War II, in front of house Křečkovská 15/65
