= Vyškov Zoo =

- 49°16′23″N 16°59′49″E
- Date opened: 1965
- Location: Vyškov
- Land area: 7 hectares (17.3 acres)
- No. of animals: 1197
- No. of species: 123
- Memberships: EARAZA
- Website: www.zoo-vyskov.cz

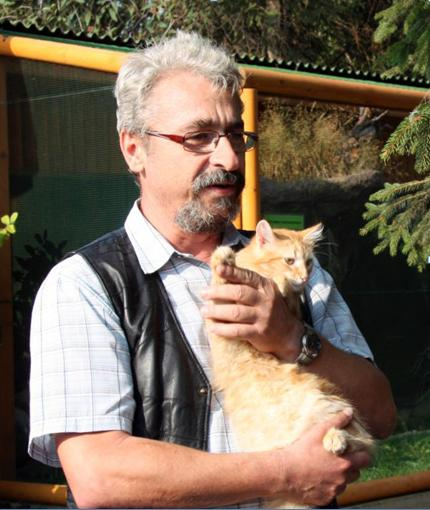
Josef Kachlík

Vyškov Zoo (Czech: Zoopark Vyškov) is a zoo in Vyškov in the South Moravian Region of the Czech Republic.

== History ==
The zoo was founded by Zdeněk Sokolíček and opened on 8 August 1965. After the years of the heyday came the critical phase, which culminated in 1990. There was a choice to either close down the zoo, or invest considerable funds and preserve it. It was decided to renovate the devastated garden, which served primarily as a winter habitat for animals from circuses and menageries. With the arrival of the new director Josef Kachlík steps were taken to develop the old garden into a modern zoo.

== Animals ==
As of 2021, the zoo keeps 1197 animals in 123 species or breeds. The breeding is focused primarily at domestic and farm animals from around the world.

== Gallery ==
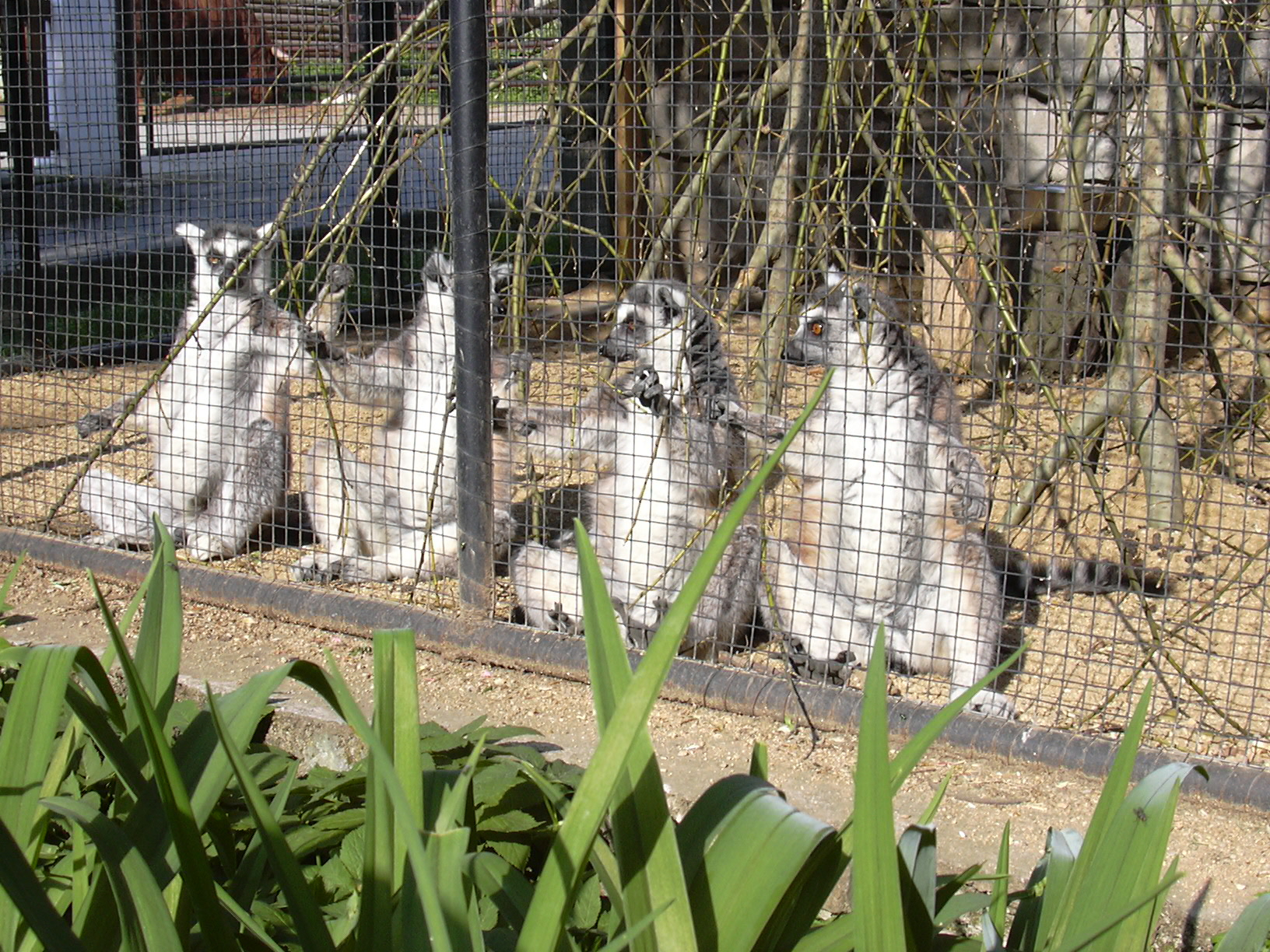

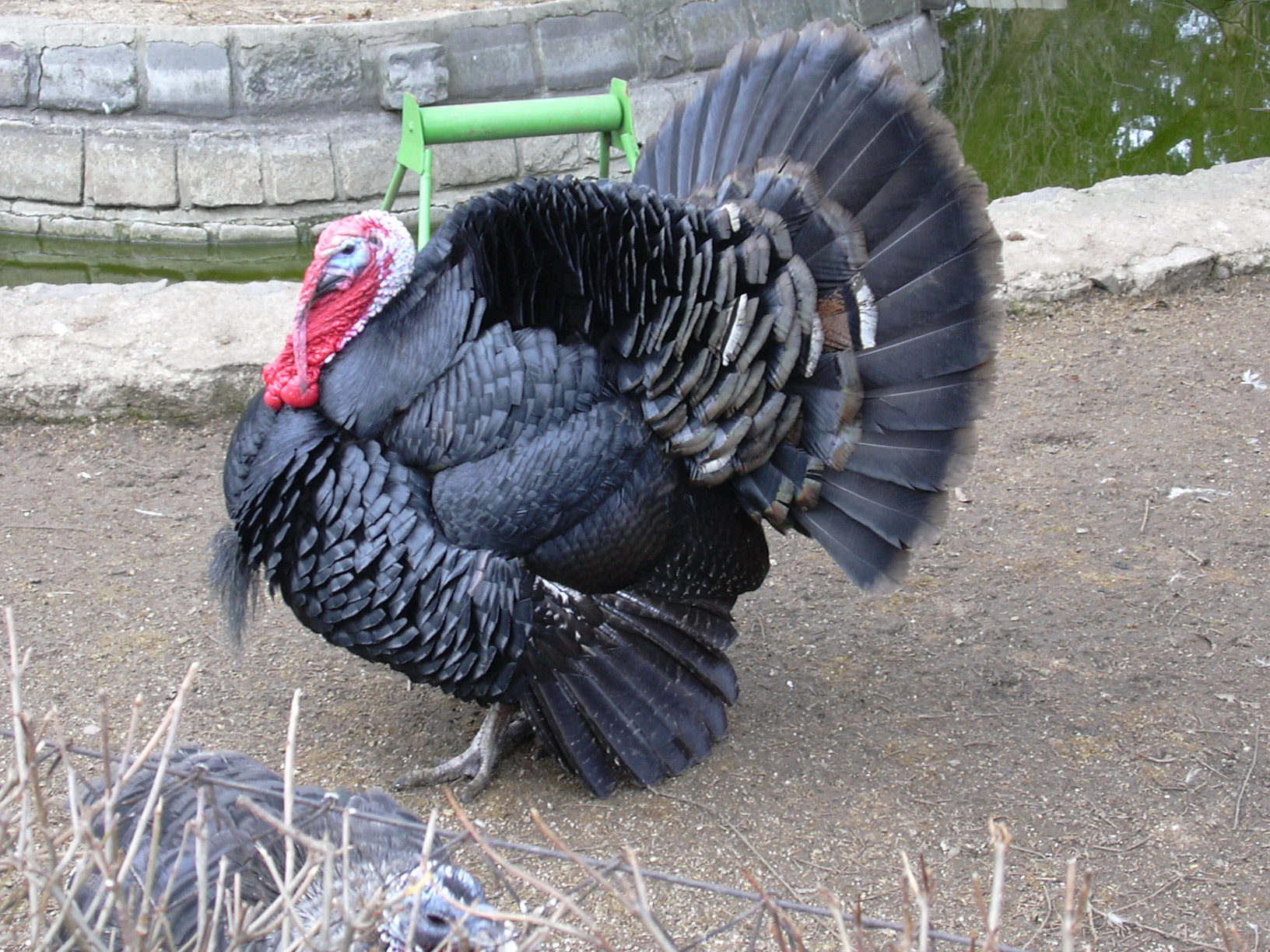

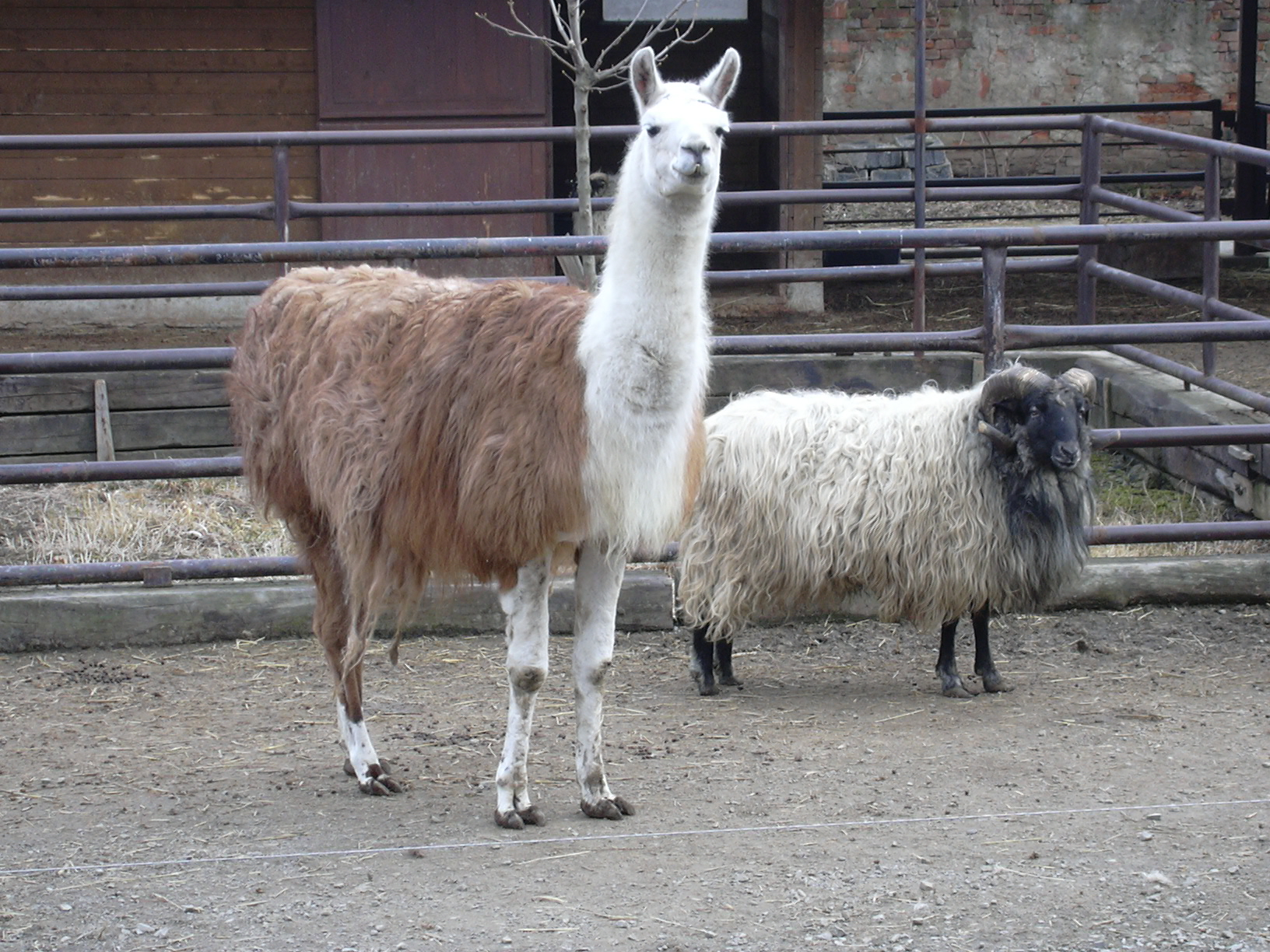

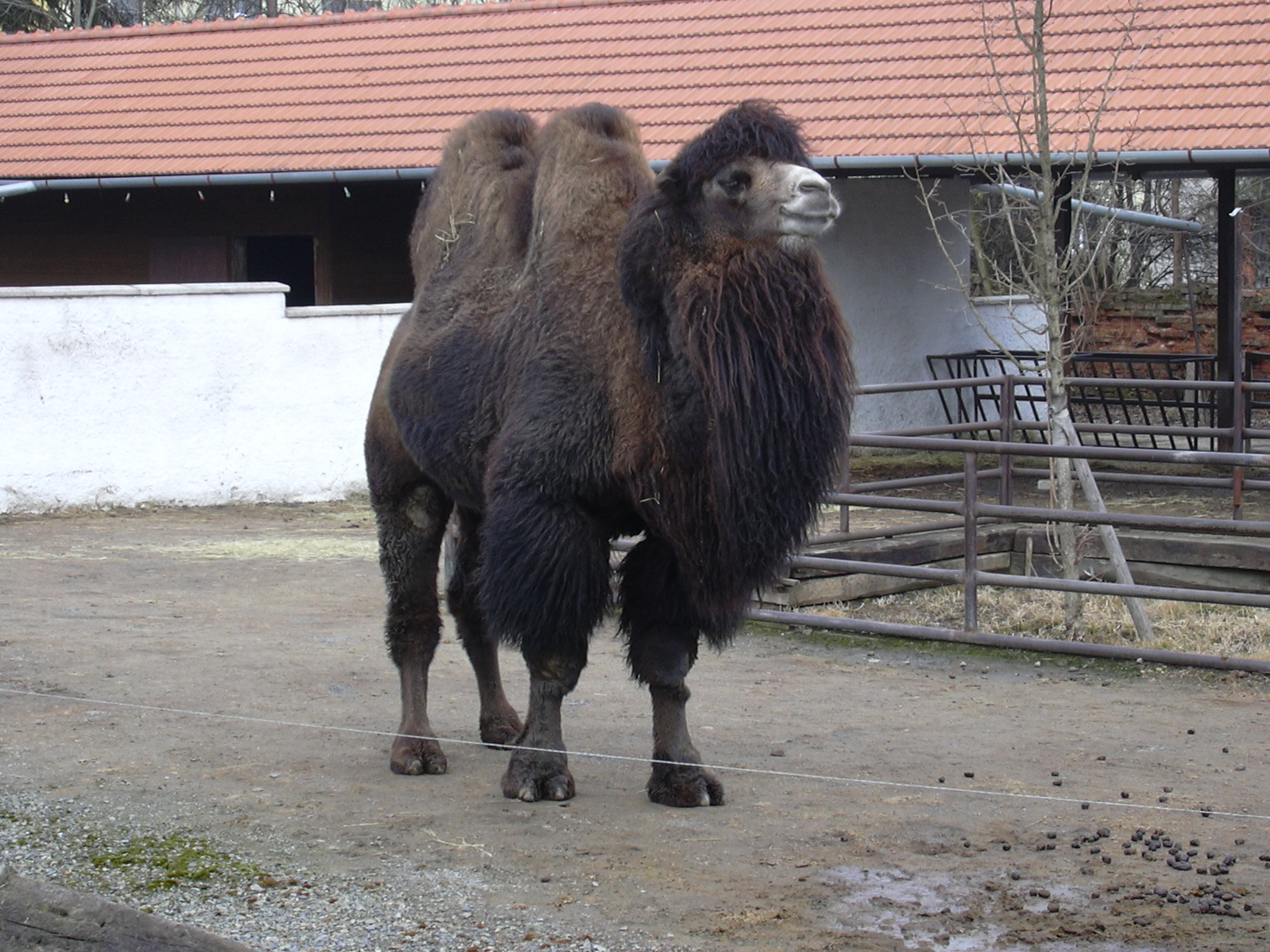

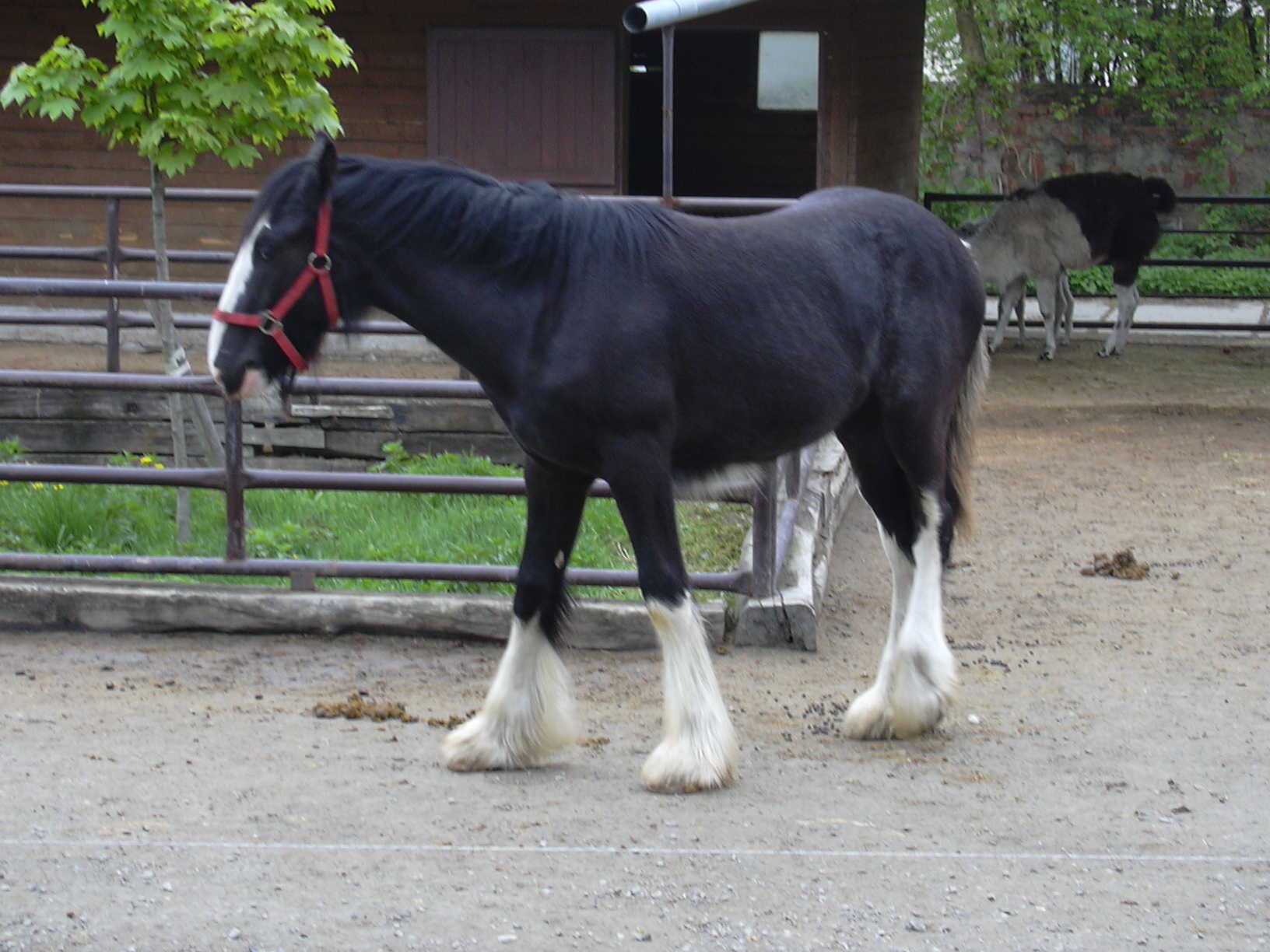
