= Vyškov-Předměstí =

- Municipal part of Vyškov
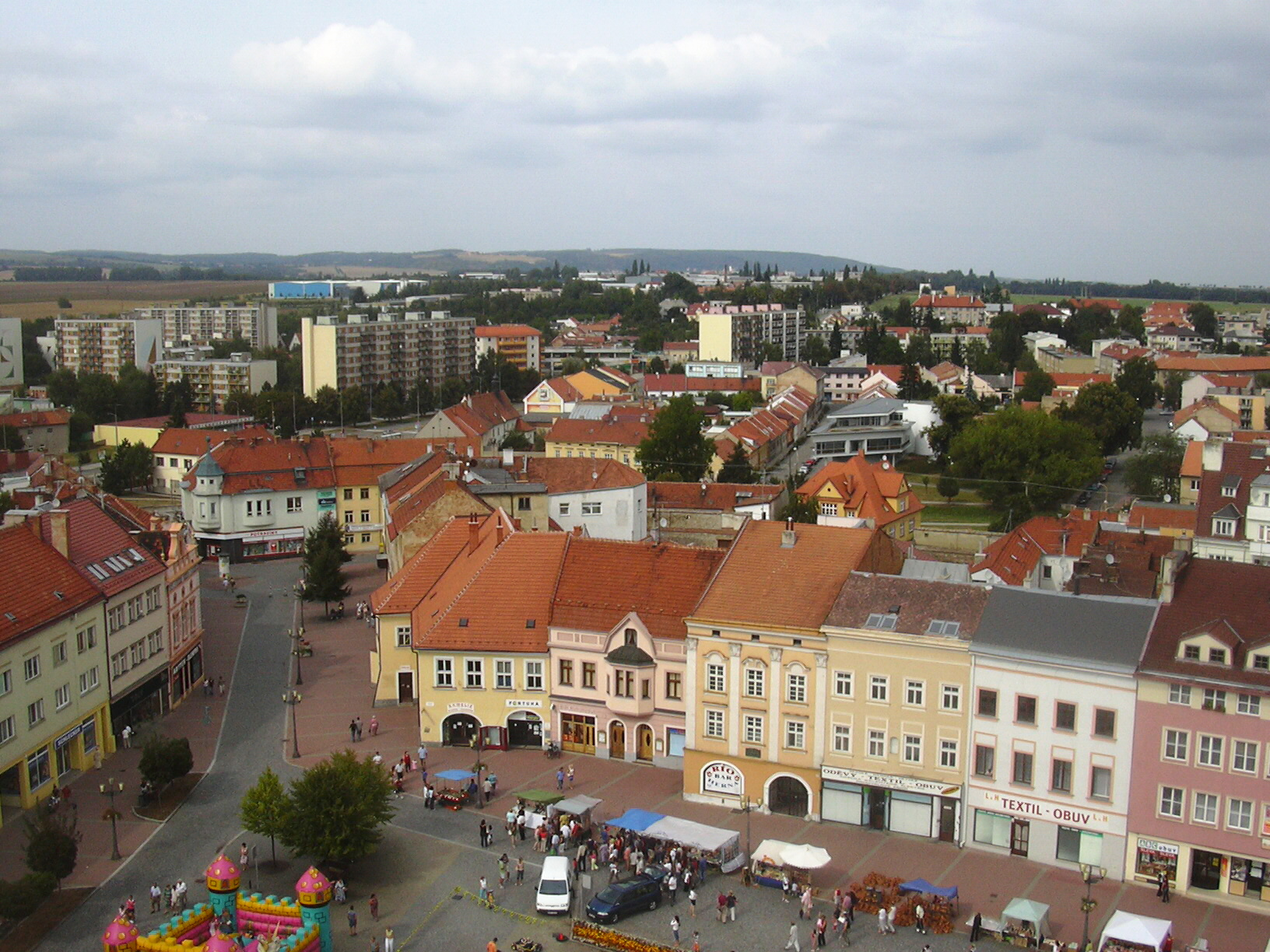
- View of Vyškov-Předměstí from the town hall
- Country: Czech Republic
- Region: South Moravian Region
- District: Vyškov
- Municipality: Vyškov
- Established: January 1, 1980

Area
  - Total: 4.45 km^{2} (1.72 sq mi)
- Elevation: 246 m (807 ft)

Population (2021)
  - Total: 6,275
  - Density: 1,410/km^{2} (3,650/sq mi)
- Time zone: UTC+1 (CET)
  - Summer (DST): UTC+2 (CEST)
- Postal code: 682 01

Vyškov-Předměstí (lit. 'Vyškov-Suburbs') is a district and municipal part of the town of Vyškov in Vyškov District of the South Moravian Region of the Czech Republic. It has about 6,300 inhabitants.

It is located between the town's center and the industrial zone Tóvární on the road to Prostějov. The entire district is divided into two halves by the city thoroughfare Dukelská street.

== History ==
Vyškov-Předměstí was originally located in its own cadastral area, created in 1826, which was incorporated into the Vyškov cadastral area in 1965.

The municipal part of Vyškov-Předměstí was established on January 1, 1980.

== Demographics ==
Historical population

Year	Pop.	±%
1900	3,708	—
1910	3,909	+5.4%
1930	3,153	−19.3%
1980	5,844	+85.3%

Year	Pop.	±%
1991	6,668	+14.1%
2001	6,651	−0.3%
2011	6,697	+0.7%
2021	6,275	−6.3%

Source: Censuses
