= Jellinek =

Jellinek is a Germanized variant of the Czech name Jelínek meaning "little deer" (diminutive of jelen). Notable people with the surname include:

- Adolf Jellinek (1821–1893), Austrian rabbi and scholar
  - Emil Jellinek (1853–1918), automobile entrepreneur, son of Adolf
    - Mercédès Jellinek (1889–1929), daughter of Emil, for whom he named the Mercedes car marque
  - Max Hermann Jellinek (1868–1938), son of Adolf
  - Georg Jellinek (1851–1911), jurist, son of Adolf
- E. Morton Jellinek (1890–1963), psychologist and alcoholism researcher
- George Jellinek (1919–2010), broadcaster, expert in classical music
