= Vyškov-Město =

- Municipal part of Vyškov
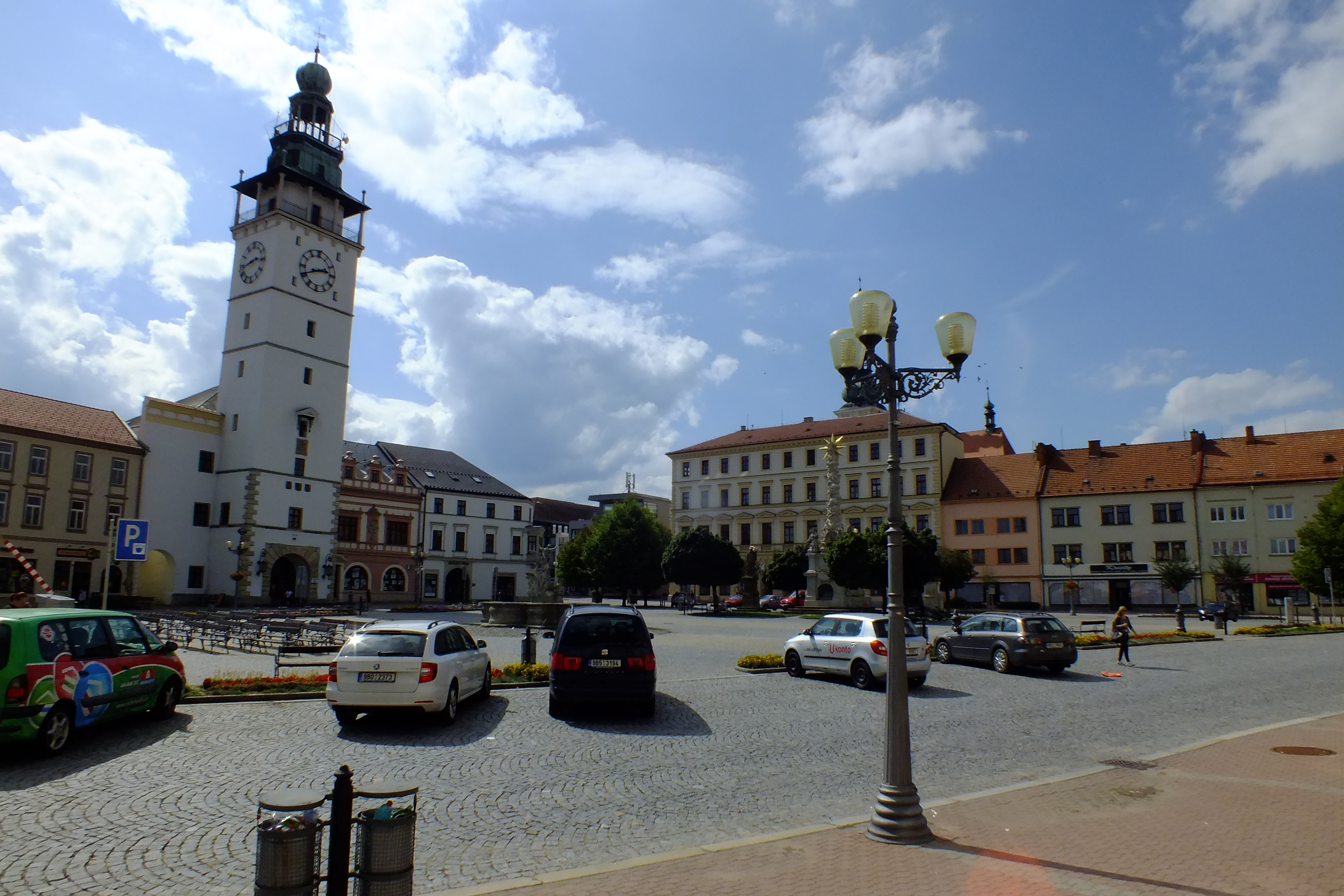
- Masaryk Square
- Country: Czech Republic
- Region: South Moravian Region
- District: Vyškov
- Municipality: Vyškov
- Established: January 1, 1980

Area
  - Total: 1.42 km^{2} (0.55 sq mi)
- Elevation: 246 m (807 ft)

Population (2021)
  - Total: 1,778
  - Density: 1,250/km^{2} (3,240/sq mi)
- Time zone: UTC+1 (CET)
  - Summer (DST): UTC+2 (CEST)
- Postal code: 682 01

Vyškov-Město (lit. 'Vyškov-Town') is a district and municipal part of the town of Vyškov in Vyškov District of the South Moravian Region of the Czech Republic. It has about 1,800 inhabitants.

== History ==
The first written mention of Vyškov dates back to 1141.

The municipal part of Vyškov-Město was established on January 1, 1980.

== Demographics ==
Historical population
| Year | Pop. | ±% |
|---|---|---|
| 1980 | 2,057 | — |
| 1991 | 1,826 | −11.2% |
| 2001 | 1,614 | −11.6% |
| 2011 | 1,474 | −8.7% |
| 2021 | 1,778 | +20.6% |
Source: Censuses
