= Vyškov =

- Town
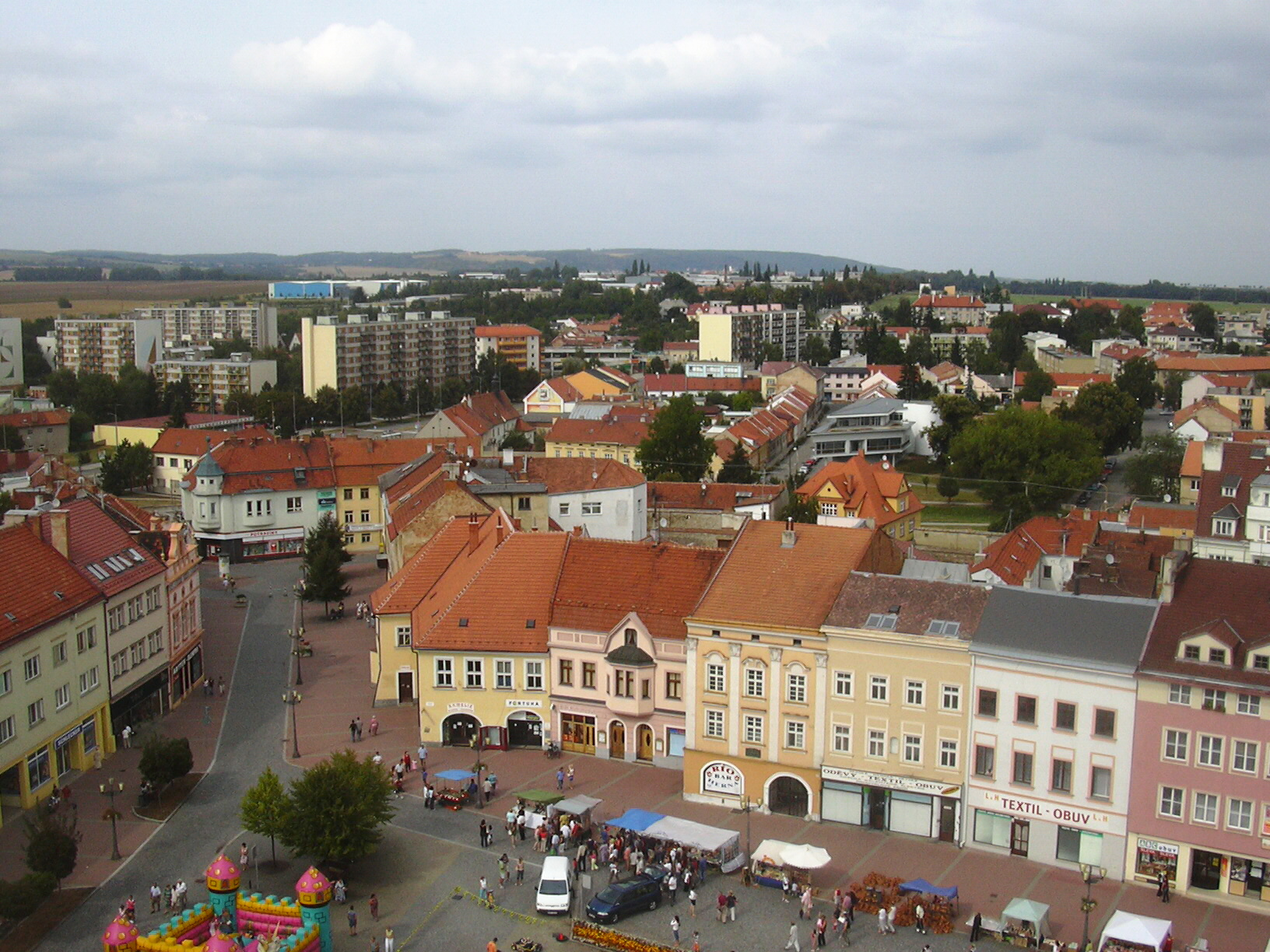
- View from the town hall

- Flag Coat of arms

- Location in the Czech Republic
- Coordinates: 49°16′39″N 16°59′56″E
- Country: Czech Republic
- Region: South Moravian
- District: Vyškov
- First mentioned: 1141

Government
  - Mayor: Karel Jurka (ODS)

Area
  - Total: 50.47 km^{2} (19.49 sq mi)
- Elevation: 254 m (833 ft)

Population (2026-01-01)
  - Total: 20,664
  - Density: 409.4/km^{2} (1,060/sq mi)
- Time zone: UTC+1 (CET)
  - Summer (DST): UTC+2 (CEST)
- Postal code: 682 01
- Website: www.vyskov-mesto.cz

Vyškov (Czech pronunciation: [ˈvɪʃkof]; German: Wischau) is a town in the South Moravian Region of the Czech Republic. It has about 21,000 inhabitants. The Haná River flows through the town. The historic town centre is well preserved and is protected as an urban monument zone. The town is known for the Vyškov Castle and Vyškov Zoo.

== Administrative division ==
Vyškov consists of 13 municipal parts (in brackets population according to the 2021 census):

- Vyškov-Město (1,778)
- Vyškov-Předměstí (6,275)
- Brňany (1,744)
- Dědice (5,668)
- Hamiltony (367)
- Křečkovice (1,111)
- Lhota (368)
- Nosálovice (1,383)
- Nouzka (338)
- Opatovice (380)
- Pařezovice (35)
- Pazderna (281)
- Rychtářov (576)

== Etymology ==
The name Vyškov is derived from the personal name Vyšek or Výšek.

== Geography ==
Vyškov is located about 25 kilometres (16 mi) east of Brno. It lies mostly in the Vyškov Gate. The southern part of the municipal territory lies in the Litenčice Hills. The northwestern part extends into the Drahany Highlands and includes the highest point of Vyškov, the hill Kuchlov at 475 m (1,558 ft) above sea level. The Haná River, formed by the confluence of the Velká Haná and Malá Haná streams in Dědice, flows through the town.

Opatovice Reservoir was built on the Malá Haná in 1972. It serves primarily for water supply.

== History ==
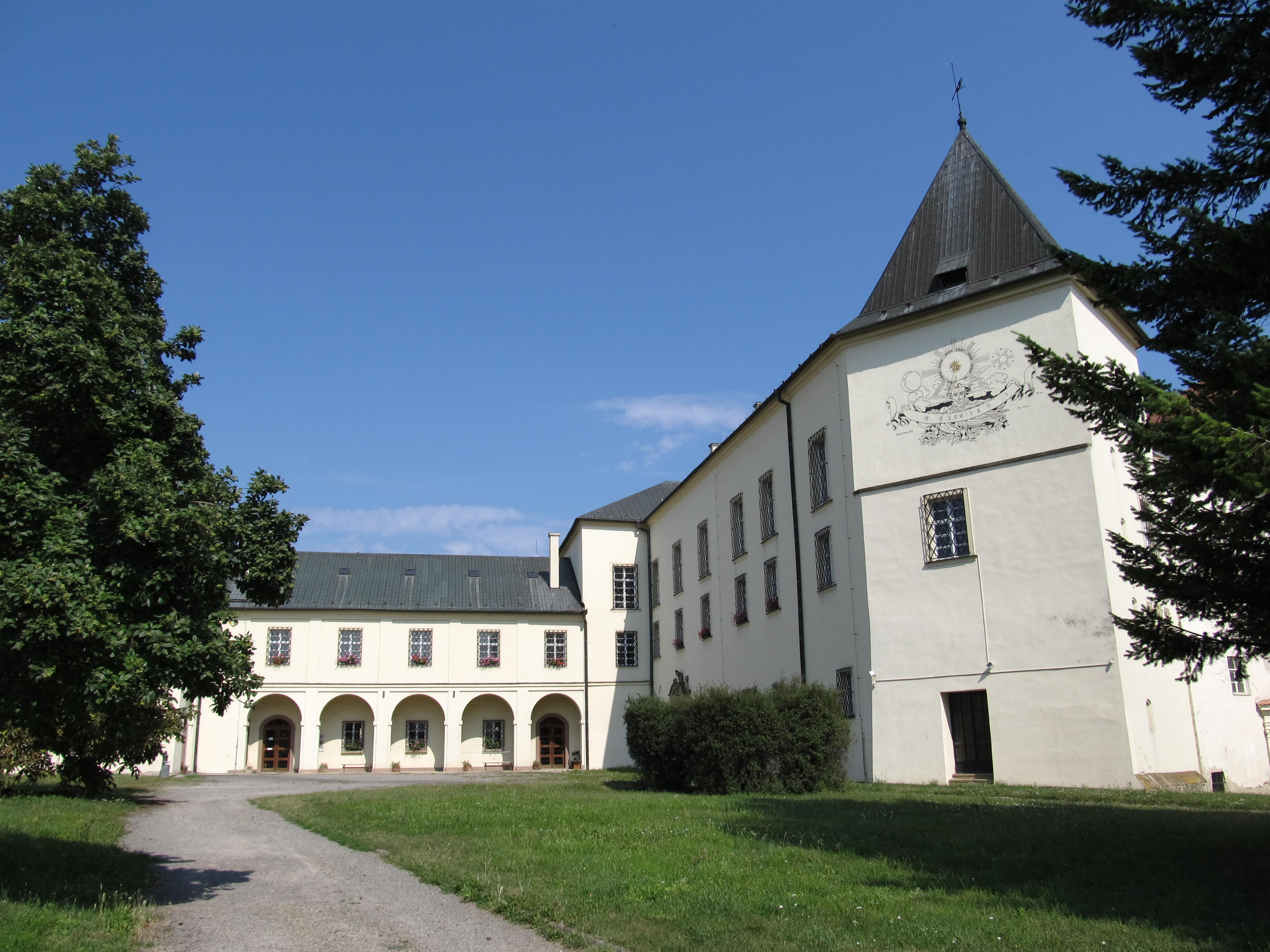
Vyškov Castle

The first written mention of Vyškov is in a deed of bishop Jindřich Zdík from 1141. It was located on crossroads of trade routes from Brno to Olomouc and Kroměříž. In the first half of the 13th century, it was acquired by Olomouc bishops, who owned it for more than 600 years. In the mid-13th century, Vyškov was promoted to a town.

Vyškov was fortified in the mid-14th century and the stone walls were built in the 15th century. During the Hussite Wars, the town was conquered and ravaged by the Hussites. The town recovered during the rule of bishop Tas of Černá Hora in the second half of the 15th century. In the 16th and early 17th centuries, Vyškov prospered and crafts developed.

Vyškov was severely damaged by the Thirty Years' War. The town was twice conquered by the Swedish troops and in 1643 it was completely plundered. Only about a third of the houses and residents survived. Vyškov again recovered, and achieved the greatest development during the rule of Karl II von Liechtenstein-Kastelkorn in the late 17th century. He had rebuilt and extended the local castle and the castle garden. In that time, Vyškov earned the nickname "Moravian Versailles".

In 1753, the town and the castle were burned down by a large fire. The castle never reached its past glory again, even though it was a meeting place of emperors Alexander I of Russia and Francis II before the Battle of Austerlitz in 1805. After the Napoleonic Wars, the town expanded and the fortifications were partially demolished.

Vyškov was one of the most affected towns by World War II in the country. It was liberated from German control on 30 April 1945, but the German army merely retreated to the hills around the town and bombed it almost continuously until victory was declared on 9 May.

A Jewish family in the town was first documented in the early 14th century, however, throughout history, Jews have been expelled from the town several times and a continuous settlement did not emerge until the mid-19th century. The Jewish community was established in 1891, but after it ceased to exist during the Holocaust during World War II, it was not restored.

Until World War II, Vyškov belonged to the smaller Moravian towns, and Brňany, Dědice, Křečkovice and Nosálovice were separate municipalities. Hamiltony and Pazderna were administered as parts of Dědice, which had the title of a market town, and Nouzka was a part of Nosálovice. In 1941–1942, they all became municipal parts of Vyškov. In 1945, the secession of Brňany, Dědice and Křečkovice was rejected by the Local Committee of Vyškov. Efforts to make these parts independent continued in the following years, but unsuccessfully. Opatovice was incorporated into Vyškov in 1980; Lhota, Pařezovice and Rychtářov were incorporated in 1986.

== Demographics ==
As of 2026, the population is 20,664, of which 48.2% are male, and 51.8% are female. People under 15 years old make up 14.6% of the population, and people over 65 years old make up 23.0%.

Historical population

Year	Pop.	±%
1869	10,103	—
1880	10,747	+6.4%
1890	11,270	+4.9%
1900	11,921	+5.8%
1910	12,801	+7.4%

Year	Pop.	±%
1921	12,432	−2.9%
1930	12,341	−0.7%
1950	13,630	+10.4%
1961	13,895	+1.9%
1970	15,404	+10.9%

Year	Pop.	±%
1980	19,268	+25.1%
1991	22,683	+17.7%
2001	22,498	−0.8%
2011	21,383	−5.0%
2021	20,304	−5.0%

Source: Censuses (Note: Excluding Zouvalka, which was part of Vyškov until 2017.)

=== 2021 census ===
As of the 2021 census, 5.2% of the population was born in another country, and 3.1% has foreign citizenship – 0.6% has Slovak, 1.3% Ukrainian, 0.3% Vietnamese, and 1.0% other citizenship.

As of the 2021 census, 93.4% of the population has Czech as their mother tongue, 1.9% Slovak, 0.6% Moravian, 0.9% Ukrainian, 0.2% Vietnamese, 0.2% Russian, and 2.8% other languages.

As of the 2021 census, 31.4% of the population is religious, of which 36.4% belong to the Roman Catholic Church, 1.6% to the Czechoslovak Hussite Church, and 0.4% to the Evangelical United Brethren Church, and 42.9% do not belong to a church or religious society. Another 68.6% of the population is irreligious.

== Economy ==
The Czech branch of Lear Corporation has its headquarters and one of the production plants in Vyškov.

== Transport ==
The D1 motorway from Brno to Ostrava runs next the town. The D46 motorway branches here off from the D1 motorway, heading towards Prostějov and Olomouc.

Vyškov is located on the railway lines Brno–Šumperk, Brno–Bohumín and Vyškov–Přerov.

== Sport ==
Vyškov has a top-level rugby team RC Vyškov, which plays in the Extraliga ragby and has become national champions 14 times.

The town is home to the football club MFK Vyškov.

== Sights ==
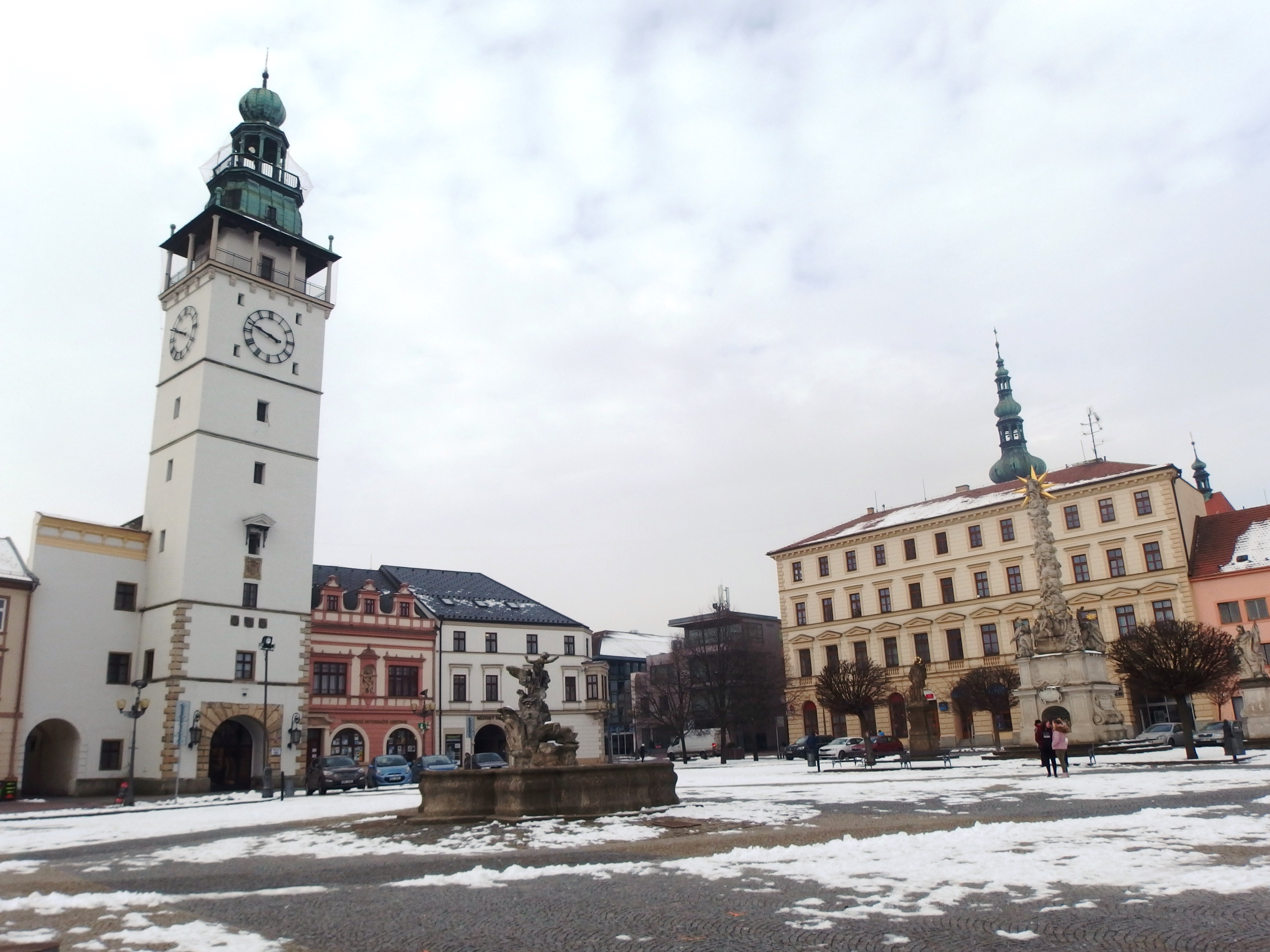
Masarykovo náměstí

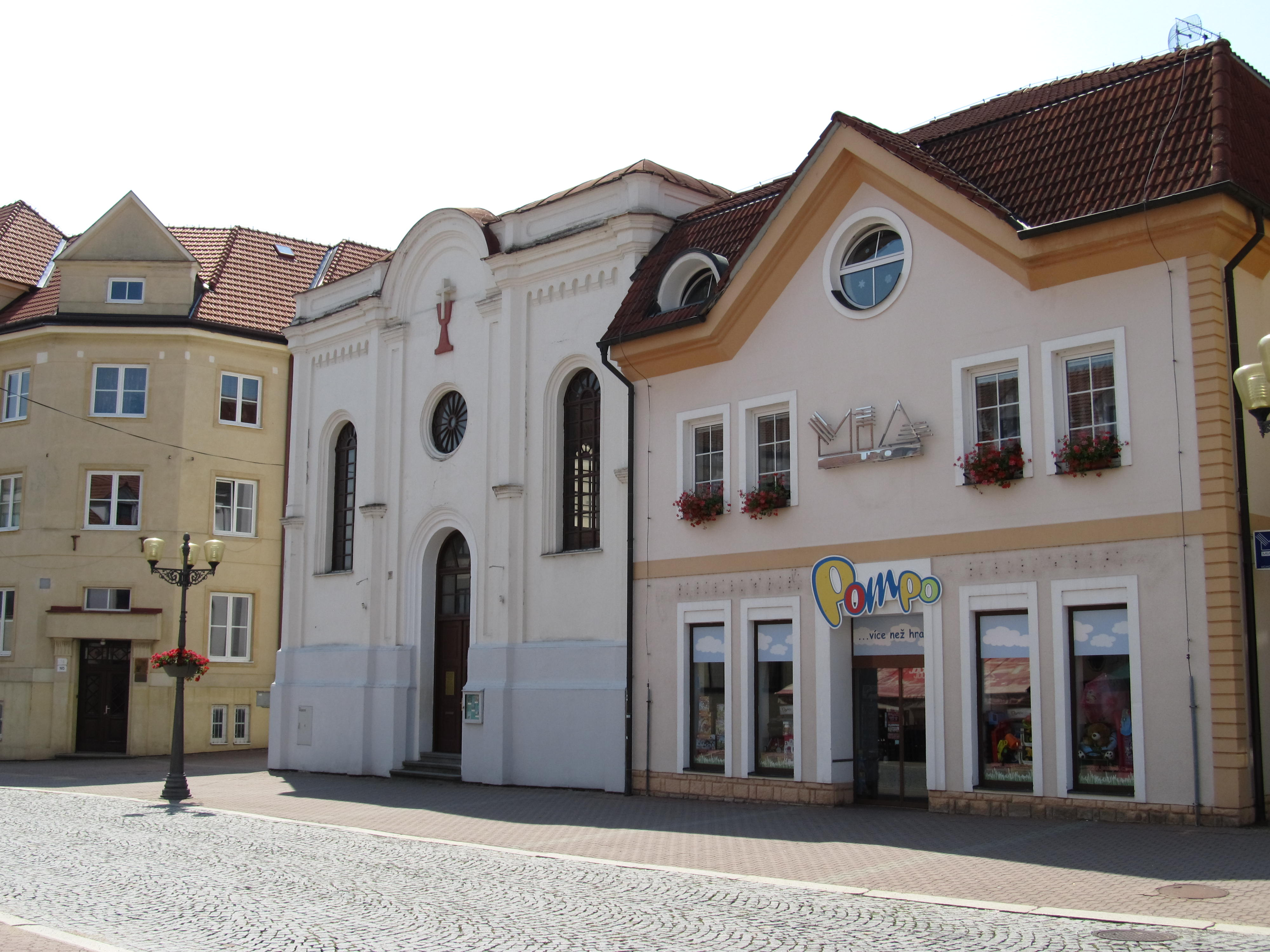
Former synagogue

The Vyškov Castle was originally a Gothic castle, rebuilt into the current form in 1665–1682. Today it houses the regional museum. The museum is known for its extensive collection folk ceramics, which was produced in Vyškov from the beginning of the 18th century until 1945. The castle includes a castle garden. The architectural landmark of the garden is the loggia from 1673.

In the historic centre of Vyškov is the triangle-shaped square Masarykovo náměstí. Its main landmark is the Renaissance town hall, built in 1569. It has stucco decoration from the 18th century. In the middle of the square are a Marian column, a fountain and a well. The marian column comes from 1719. The Baroque fountain was created in the 18th century and has motif of Ganymede on an eagle. The well is from 1839.

The Church of the Assumption of the Virgin Mary is the main church of Vyškov. The original late Gothic church was built in 1464–1466 and rebuilt in the Baroque style in 1773. A Gothic portal from the original church has been preserved. The Chapel of Saint Odile was added in 1692.

The historic centre was delimited by the town walls, the remains of which have been preserved to this day. The town gates were demolished.

The Jewish community is commemorated by the Jewish cemetery and the neo-Romanesque building of the former synagogue. The synagogue is atypically located on the town square.

Among the most visited tourist destinations in the town is the Vyškov Zoo. It was opened in 1965 and keeps over 130 species of animals. In 2006, a Dinopark was opened in Vyškov. It shows life-size dinosaur models.

== Notable people ==
- Andreas Zelinka (1802–1868), mayor of Vienna in 1851–1860
- Alois Musil (1868–1944), Austrian-Czech theologist, orientalist, explorer and writer
- Jan Jelínek (1893–1974), legionnaire and writer
- Jan Koutný (1897–1976), gymnast, Olympic medalist
- Helena Bochořáková-Dittrichová (1894–1980), illustrator and graphic novelist
- Otto Planetta (1899–1934), Austrian Nazi politician who murdered Engelbert Dollfuss
- Karel Kachyňa (1924–2004), film director
- Antonín Tučapský (1928–2014), composer
- Boris Hybner (1941–2016), actor and mime
- Josef Mazura (born 1956), football player and manager
- Michal Grošek (born 1975), ice hockey player
- Lada Kozlíková (born 1979), cyclist
- Michal Barinka (born 1984), ice hockey player
- Michal Kadlec (born 1984), footballer
- Albert Rusnák (born 1994), Slovak footballer

== Twin towns – sister cities ==
Vyškov is twinned with:

- Cognac, France
- Döbeln, Germany
- Jarosław, Poland
- Michalovce, Slovakia
- Virovitica, Croatia
