= Křižánky =

- Municipality
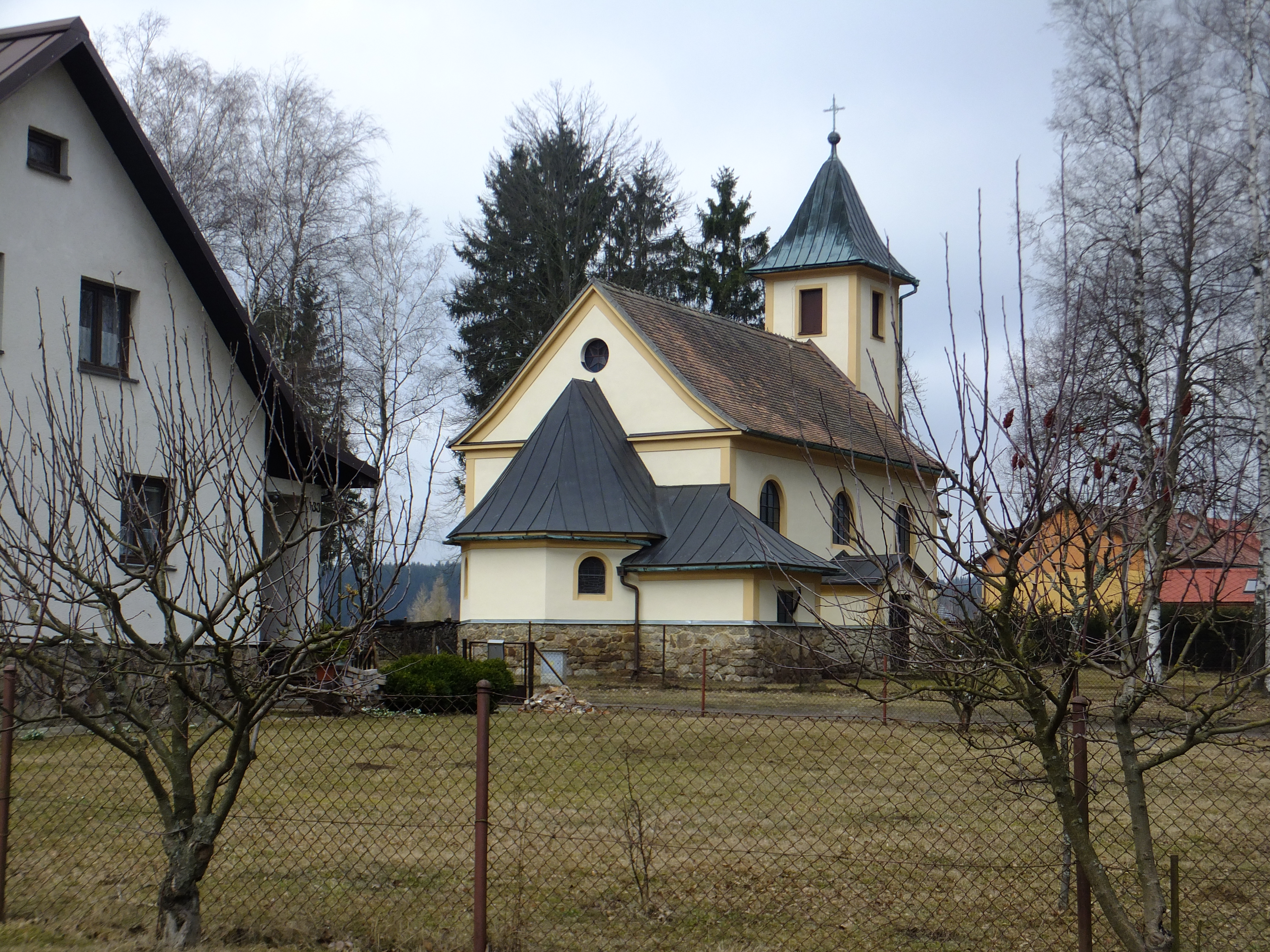
- Church of Our Lady of Help

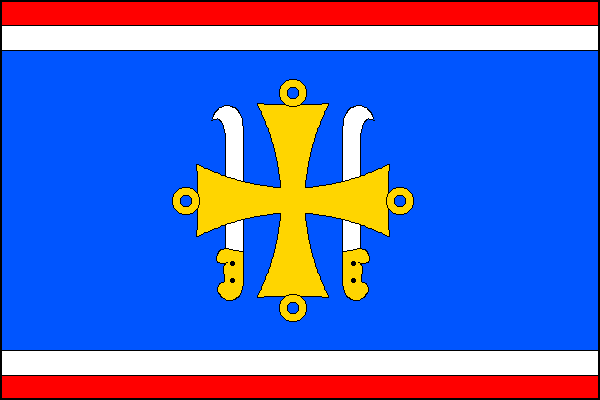
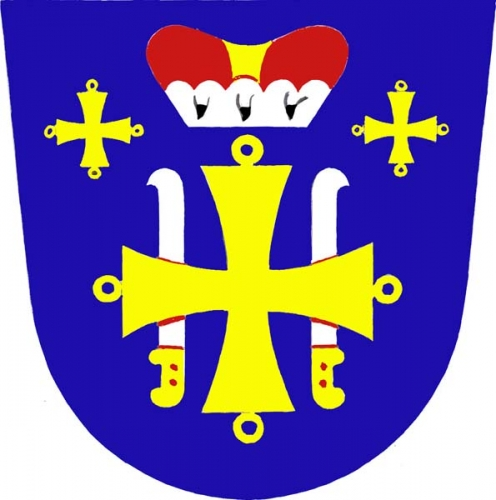
- Flag Coat of arms

- Location in the Czech Republic
- Coordinates: 49°41′9″N 16°3′53″E
- Country: Czech Republic
- Region: Vysočina
- District: Žďár nad Sázavou
- First mentioned: 1392

Area
  - Total: 11.97 km^{2} (4.62 sq mi)
- Elevation: 615 m (2,018 ft)

Population (2026-01-01)
  - Total: 403
  - Density: 33.7/km^{2} (87.2/sq mi)
- Time zone: UTC+1 (CET)
  - Summer (DST): UTC+2 (CEST)
- Postal code: 592 02
- Website: obeckrizanky.cz

Křižánky is a municipality in Žďár nad Sázavou District in the Vysočina Region of the Czech Republic. It has about 400 inhabitants. Most of the built-up area with well preserved folk architecture is protected as a village monument reservation.

== Administrative division ==
Křižánky consists of three municipal parts (in brackets population according to the 2021 census):

- České Křižánky (76)
- České Milovy (25)
- Moravské Křižánky (273)

== Geography ==
Křižánky is located about 16 kilometres (10 mi) northeast of Žďár nad Sázavou and 64 km (40 mi) northwest of Brno. The municipality lies on both banks of the Svratka River, which forms the border between the historical lands of Bohemia and Moravia. The stream Kyšperský potok, which flows into the Svratka in the municipality, supplies the relatively large fishpond Kyšperský rybník.

Křižánky is located in the Upper Svratka Highlands and within the Žďárské vrchy Protected Landscape Area. The mountain Devět skal, which is with an elevation of 836 metres (2,743 ft) the highest peak of the Upper Svratka Highlands and the second highest peak of the Bohemian-Moravian Highlands, is located in the municipal territory.

== History ==
The first written mention of České Křižánky is from 1392. Moravské Křižánky was probably founded later and was first mentioned in 1437. In the mid-17th century, glassworks were founded in both parts of Křižánky and the villages began to develop, when glassmakers built their houses here. From the 1820s, Křižánky was known for the production of files.

== Demographics ==
Historical population

Year	Pop.	±%
1869	1,399	—
1880	1,392	−0.5%
1890	1,197	−14.0%
1900	1,197	+0.0%
1910	1,189	−0.7%

Year	Pop.	±%
1921	1,163	−2.2%
1930	1,132	−2.7%
1950	777	−31.4%
1961	723	−6.9%
1970	618	−14.5%

Year	Pop.	±%
1980	520	−15.9%
1991	406	−21.9%
2001	367	−9.6%
2011	361	−1.6%
2021	374	+3.6%

Source: Censuses

== Transport ==
There are no railways or major roads passing through the municipality.

== Sights ==
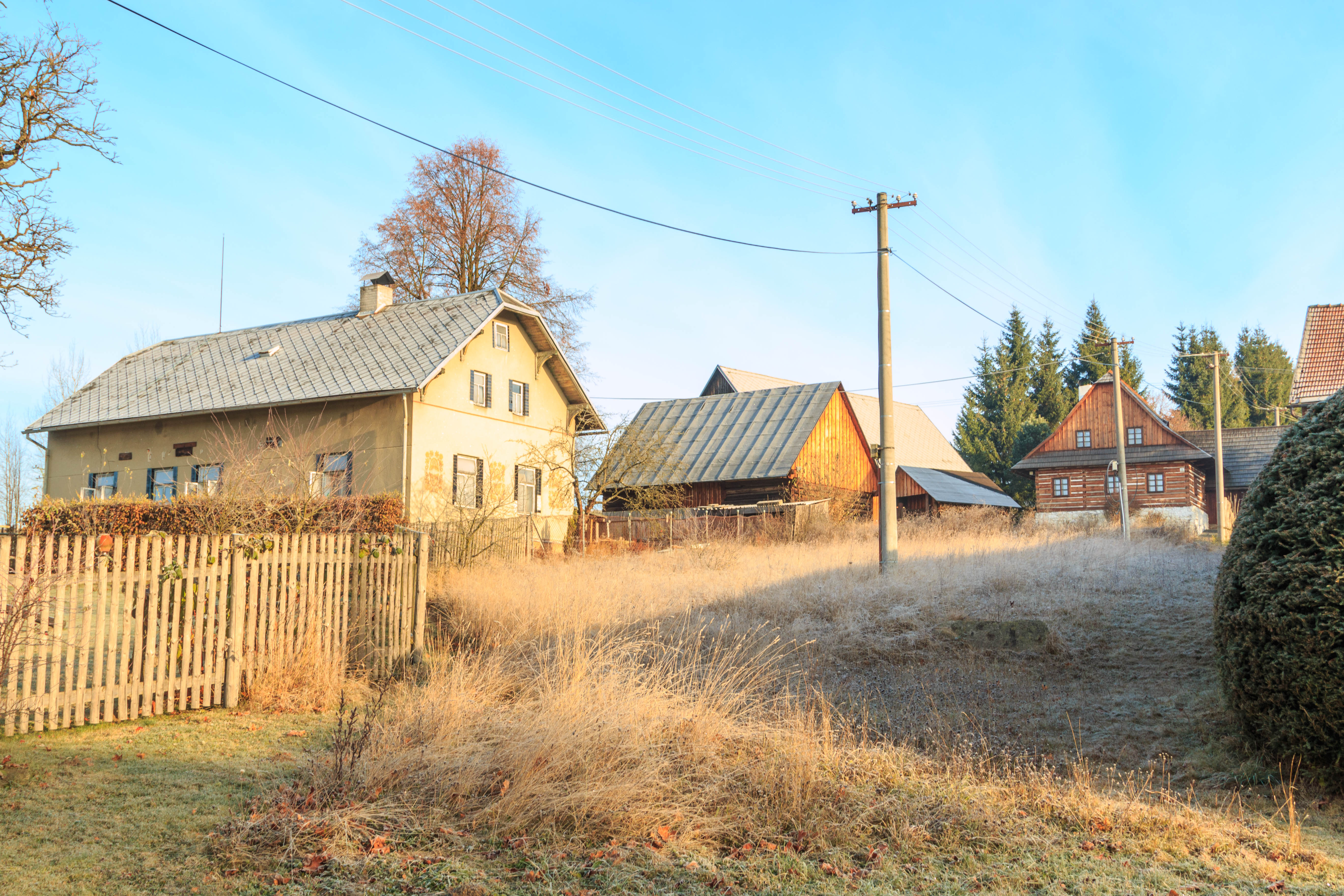
Rural houses in České Křižánky

The main landmark of Křižánky is the Church of Our Lady of Help. It was built in 1932–1934.

For its preserved folk architecture, most of the built-up area is protected as a village monument reservation. The village consists of scattered wooden and brick houses and farm buildings from the 18th–20th centuries.

== Notable people ==
- František Cína Jelínek (1882–1961), landscape painter; lived and worked here
