= Joseph A. Litterer =

American organizational theorist and academic

Joseph August (Joe) Litterer (October 16, 1926 – December 5, 1995) was an American organizational theorist and Professor at the University of Massachusetts, known for his work on the state of the art and history of systemic management.

== Biography ==
Born in Philadelphia to Charles Litterer and Gladys Bader, Litterer obtained his BSc in mechanical engineering and his MBA both from Drexel University. Sequentially he obtained his PhD in business administration from the University of Illinois.

Litterer started his academic career at the University of Illinois, and later moved to the University of Massachusetts. He was visiting professor at many universities national and abroad. He was elected Fellow of the Academy of Management, and its 25th president in the year 1969–1970.

Litterer was married to the American organizational theorist Mariann Jelinek.

== Selected publications ==
- Joseph A. Litterer (1967). The Analysis of Organizations.
- Litterer, Joseph A. Organizations: structure and behaviour. 1969.
- Jelinek, Mariann, Joseph August Litterer, and Raymond E. Miles. Organizations by design: Theory and practice. Business Publications, 1981.

Articles, a selection:

- Litterer, Joseph A. "Systematic management: The search for order and integration." Business History Review 35.04 (1961): 461–476.
- Litterer, Joseph A. "Systematic management: design for organizational recoupling in American manufacturing firms." Business History Review 37.04 (1963): 369–391.
- Litterer, Joseph A. "Conflict in organization: A re-examination." Academy of Management Journal 9.3 (1966): 178–186.
- Jelinek, Mariann, and Joseph A. Litterer. "Toward a cognitive theory of organizations." Advances in managerial cognition and organizational information processing 5 (1994): 3-41.
- Jelinek, Mariann, and Joseph A. Litterer. "Toward entrepreneurial organizations: Meeting ambiguity with engagement." Entrepreneurship Theory and Practice 19 (1995): 137–168.
