= František Cína Jelínek =

Czech painter (1882–1961)

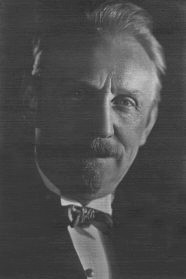
František Cína Jelínek

František Cína Jelínek (6 June 1882 in Prague-Karlín – 3 February 1961 in Prague) was a Czech landscape painter.

== Biography ==
Born on 6 June 1882 in Prague, he was the son of an innkeeper. He graduated from high school in Křemencova Street, then switched to the fourth grade art technical college and later studied at the Prague Academy under professors Vojtěch Hynais and Rudolf Otto von Ottenfeld.

His work was realistic and romantic. He painted natural pictures of the landscape outdoors in rural areas;, he did not like the elements of civilization. Its landscape work is full of dynamism. He built a cottage in Křižánky where he spent the rest of his life.

His paintings are mainly located in galleries in the Czech Republic.

He died in Prague 3 February 1961.

He was a keen skier and cyclist and he was also one of the first promoters of skiing in Svratka, Žďár nad Sázavou.

== Literature ==
- Jelínek, František Cína. In Slovník českých a slovenských výtvarných umělců 1950-2002. Ostrava : Výtvarné centrum Chagall, 1999. ISBN 80-86171-04-3. Svazek IV., s. 218.
- TOMAN, Prokop. Nový slovník československých výtvarných umělců. 3. vyd. Svazek 1. Praha : Rudolf Ryšavý, 1947. Heslo Jelínek, Cína František, s. 428.

== See also ==
- List of Czech painters
