= Mariann Jelinek =

American organizational theorist

Mariann Jelinek is an American organizational theorist, and emeritus Professor of Strategy at the College of William & Mary. She is noted for her contributions in the field of management of technology and innovation.

== Early life and education ==
Born in 1942, in 1960 Jelinek started to study English, French, Modern European history at the University of California, Berkeley, where she received her A.B. in 1967, her M.A. in English literature in 1968 and her Ph.D. in English literature in 1973. In 1977 she obtained his D.B.A. in administrative systems from Harvard Business School with the thesis, entitled "Institutionalizing innovation."

== Career ==
Jelinek started her academic career with appointments at the Tuck School of Business, the McGill University, and the University at Albany, SUNY. In 1984 she was appointed professor at the Case Western Reserve University, and in 1989 moved to the College of William & Mary, where she was Professor of Strategy for 22 years. Since 2001, she has served as a fellow at the Center for Innovation Management Studies (CIMS) at the North Carolina State University, becoming academic fellow in 2002. From the years 2007 to 2010, she was also visiting research scholar at the Eindhoven University of Technology in The Netherlands, and was visiting research scholar at the University of Melbourne in Australia.

== Personal life ==
Mariann Jelinek was married to the American organizational theorist Joseph A. Litterer (1926–1995).

Jelinek's research interests are in the fields of management of technology and innovation, and organizational change, specifically the leveraging information for strategic advantage.

== Selected publications ==
- Lau, James B., and Mariann Jelinek. Behavior in organizations. Irwin, 1979.
- Jelinek, Mariann. Institutionalizing innovation: A study of organizational learning systems. New York: Praeger, 1979.
- Jelinek, Mariann, Joseph August Litterer, and Raymond E. Miles. Organizations by design: Theory and practice. Business Publications, 1981.
- Jelinek, Mariann, and Claudia Bird Schoonhoven. The innovation marathon: Lessons from high technology firms. San Francisco: Jossey-Bass, 1993.

Articles, a selection:

- Jelinek M. (1980) "Toward Systematic Management: Alexander Hamilton Church," Business History Review 54: p. 63-79.
- Goldhar, Joel D., and Mariann Jelinek. "Plan for economies of scope." Harvard Business Review 61.6 (1983): 141–148.
- Adler, Nancy J., and Mariann Jelinek. "Is "organization culture" culture bound?." Human Resource Management 25.1 (1986): 73–90.
