= Vladislav Jelínek =

Czech footballer

Personal information
- Full name: Vladislav Jelínek-Jelen
- Position: Midfielder

Senior career*
Years	Team	Apps	(Gls)
- Smíchov

International career
1906–1907	Bohemia	3	(0)
- * Club domestic league appearances and goals

Vladislav Jelínek-Jelen was a Czech footballer who played as a midfielder.

== Club career ==
During his playing career, Jelínek played for Smíchov.

== International career ==
On 1 April 1906, Jelínek made his debut for Bohemia in Bohemia's second game, (Note: The April 1906 meeting is regarded as the first official game for Bohemia by the Football Association of the Czech Republic (FAČR), with a meeting between Hungary and Bohemia on 5 April 1903 subsequently being recognised as a Prague representative team by the FAČR. The Hungarian Football Federation recognises the April 1903 meeting as official for Bohemia.) starting in a 1–1 draw against Hungary. Jelínek would later make two more appearances for Bohemia.
