= Mercedes Jelinek =

American photographer

- Born: New Haven, Connecticut, USA
- Education: Purchase College, State University of New York, Louisiana State University.
- Website: www.mercedesjelinek.com

Mercedes Jelinek (born 1985) is an American photographer working in New York and Italy. She specializes in black and white portraiture, and her work has been published and exhibited internationally.

== Life and work ==
Jelinek was born in 1985 and graduated high school in Madison, Connecticut. She attended Purchase College, State University of New York, where she earned a BFA in Visual Arts and Louisiana State University, where she received her MFA. From 2014 to 2017, Jelinek was a resident artist at the Penland School of Crafts.

Jelinek's book These Americans, published by Kris Graves Projects, NYC (2017), is a series of photographs depicting individuals who attended the Women’s March (January 21, 2017) on Washington DC and has been collected by the Museum of Modern Art.

Jelinek is among the co-founders of the Better Than A Bandana Mask Project. Her book LOST, Spruce Pine, published by Kris Graves Projects, NYC (2019), is part of LOST II; a set containing twenty photography monographs by twenty artists that have been collected by the Metropolitan Museum of Art, Whitney Museum, Guggenheim Museum, Amon Carter Museum of American Art, Syracuse University, School of the Art Institute of Chicago, Arcadia University, Texas State University, University of Iowa, Ryerson University and George Washington University; amongst others.

== Exhibitions ==
=== Solo ===
- Mercedes Jelinek: Lost in Spruce Pine, Silver Space Gallery, Asheville, NC (2020)
- These Americans, Cary Arts Center Gallery, Cary, NC (2018)

=== Group ===
- Distinction, Photographic Center Northwest, Seattle, WA (2020)
- Lost Carmel, Center for Photographic Arts, Carmel by the Sea, CA (2020)
- Center Forward 2018, Center for Fine Art Photography, Fort Collins, CO (2018)
- Colorless, Foundry Art Centre, St. Charles, MO (2018)
- United/Divided, Glenn Echo Photo Works, Washington D.C.(2018)
- Mono-kromatic, Praxis Gallery, Minneapolis, MN (2018)
- View Find 6: Photography, Page Bond Gallery, Richmond, VA (2017)
- EXQUISITE CORPSE, Cassilhaus Gallery, Chapel Hill, NC (2017)
- This Is a Photograph, Penland Gallery, Penland School of Craft, Penland, NC (2016)
- Maker Moxie, Peters Valley Gallery, Peters Valley School of Craft, Layton, New Jersey (2016)
- Impact, Foundry Art Centre, St. Charles, MO (2016)
- The Barns: 2015 - Penland Gallery, Penland Gallery, Penland, NC (2015)
- 30-Under-30, Vermont Center for Photography, Brattleboro, VT (2015)
- 10x10x10xTieton, Mighty Tieton Gallery, Tieton, WA (2012)
- Ipso Facto, Gallery MC, New York, NY (2008)

== Publications ==
- These Americans by Mercedes Jelinek. Published by KG+, NYC (2017).
- LOST, Spruce Pine by Mercedes Jelinek. Published by KG+, NYC (2019) Collected by The Metropolitan Museum of Art, Getty Research Institute, Whitney Museum, Guggenheim Museum, Amon Carter Museum of American Art, Syracuse University, School of the Art Institute of Chicago, Arcadia University, Texas State University, University of Iowa, Ryerson University and George Washington University; amongst others.
