= Jan Jelínek (legionnaire) =

Czech legionnaire and author

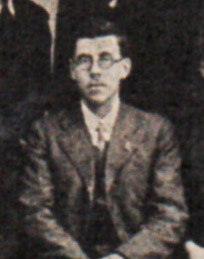
- As president of ČsOL in Boskovice
- Born: 8 April 1893; Vyškov, Austria-Hungary
- Died: 5 July 1974 (aged 81); Boskovice, Czechoslovakia
- Writing career
- Genres: Sociology, history, politics,
- Notable work: The veterans from Czechoslovak Legions of the Region Boskovice
- Movement: Historiography

Jan Jelínek (8 April 1893 – 5 July 1974) was a Czech legionnaire and writer. He is author of a book about legionnaires from the Boskovice region. He wrote about legionnaires in Russian, Italian, and French from 1931 to 1938.

== Military career ==
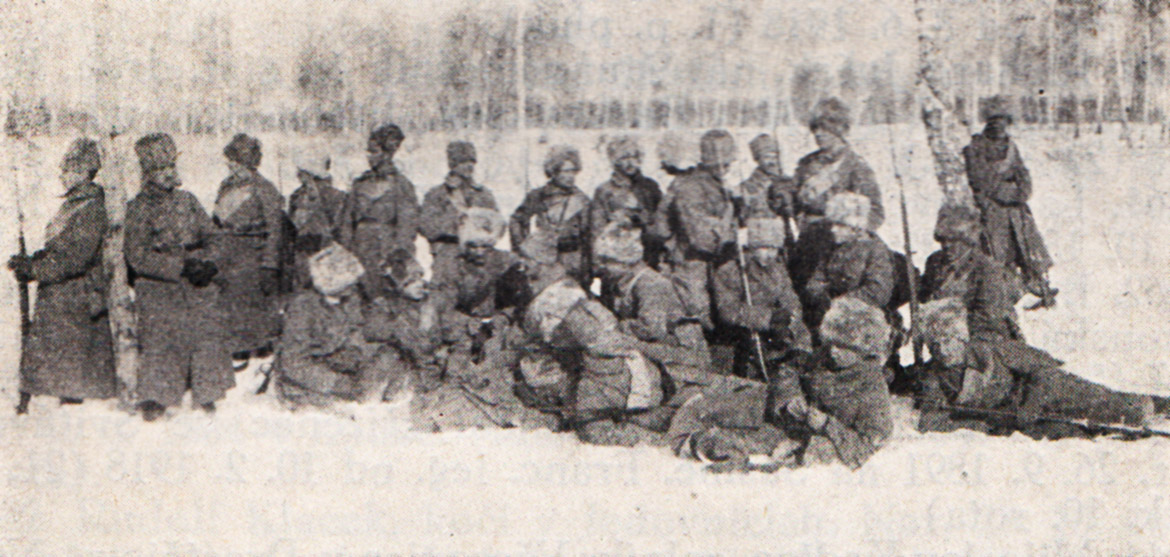
Jan Jelínek, standing second from right, Chelyabinsk, March 1919

On 10 August 1915, during the First World War, Jelínek was enlisted into the Austro-Hungarian 8th field regiment (Moravian). He joined the Czechoslovak Legions at Menzelinsk on 22 August 1917 after being captured by the Imperial Russian Army. He served in the 9th Czechoslovak Rifle Regiment Legion, 3rd troop, and stated that he had been in the 9th company of the 3rd regiment of Karel Havlíček. His legionary service ended on 2 August 1920 with the rank of private.

== Writing career ==
After the war Jelínek moved to Boskovice, worked as a revenue clerk, and wrote for a newspaper. He also became a leading member of the Czechoslovak legionnaires' syndicate (ČsOL).

His The veterans from Czechoslovak Legions of the Region Boskovice describes the activity of the Czechoslovak Legions from Boskovice in Italy, France, and Russia. Nearly 14,300 people from the area served in the First World War, or approximately 17 percent of the 1914 population. Of these legionnaires, 1,824 were killed, 604 were injured, and 2,600 were captured. Jelínek researched the book by interviewing other former legionnaires, gaining insight into their lives after the war, their experience in the legions, and their motivations for joining.

Jelínek made his last public appearance on 25 October 1968 during a celebration of Czechoslovakia's 50th anniversary.
