= Litterer (band) =

Heavy metal band from Iowa

Litterer is a heavy metal band formed in 1980 from Charles City, Iowa. They dissolved in 1996. In 2019 they were inducted into the Iowa Rock 'n' Roll Hall of Fame.

== Discography ==
- 1987 - Rock This City
- 1995 - Romancing The Night

== Members ==
- Tom Litterer - bass guitar and lead vocals
- Steve Litterer - guitar and backing vocals
- Brent Estlund - guitar
- Carleen Litterer - keyboards
- Dave Litterer - drums
