= Nosálovice =

- Municipal part of Vyškov
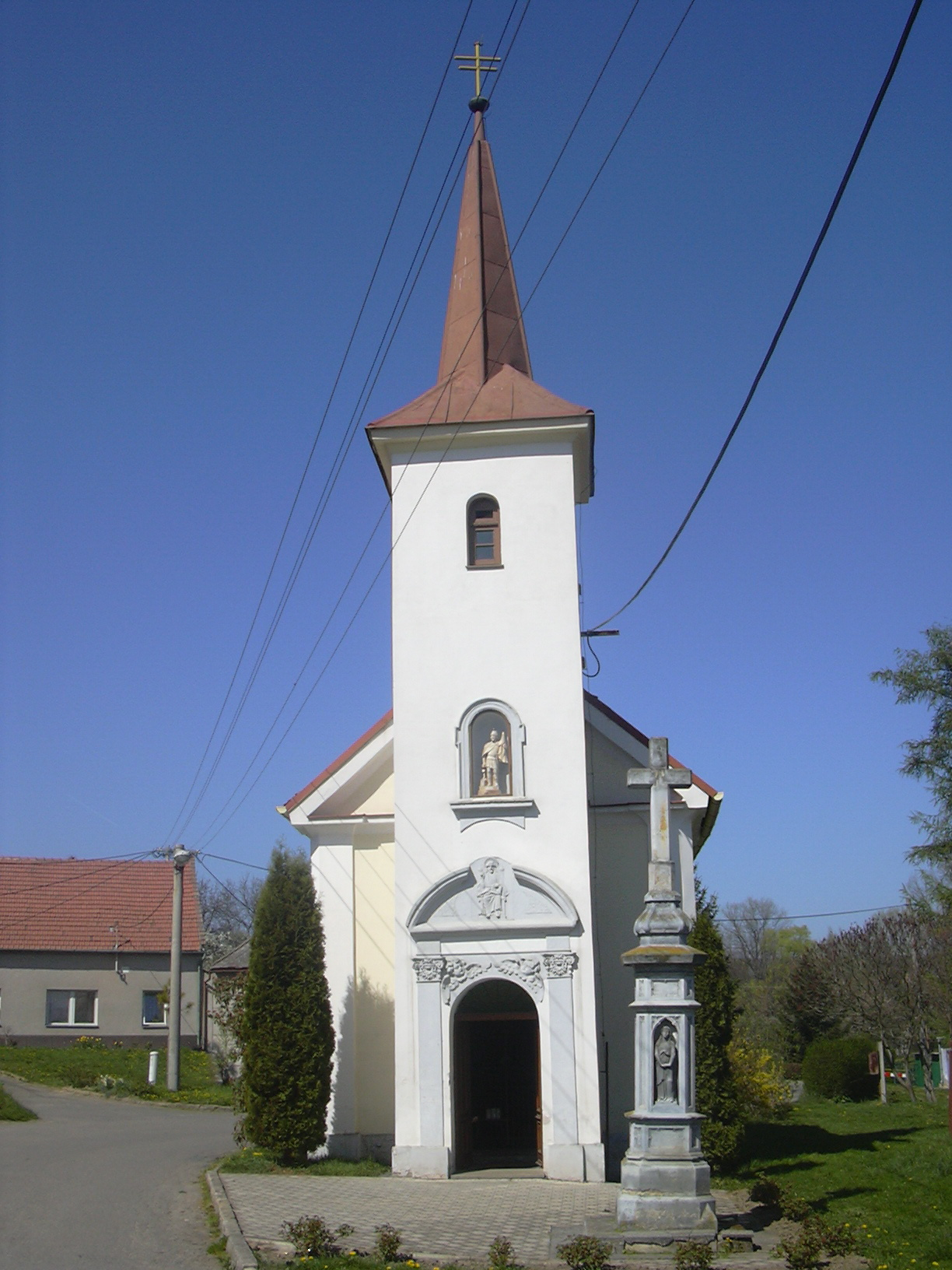
- Chapel of Virgin Mary of Vranov
- Interactive map of Nosálovice
- Country: Czech Republic
- Region: South Moravian Region
- District: Vyškov
- Municipality: Vyškov

Area
  - Total: 1.41 km^{2} (0.54 sq mi)

Population (2021)
  - Total: 1,383
  - Density: 981/km^{2} (2,540/sq mi)
- Time zone: UTC+1 (CET)
  - Summer (DST): UTC+2 (CEST)
- Postal code: 682 01

Nosálovice is a village and municipal part of the town of Vyškov in Vyškov District of the South Moravian Region of the Czech Republic.

Located approximately 1 kilometre (1 mi) southwest of Vyškov and 28 kilometres (17 mi) northeast of Brno, it lies on the road from Vyškov to Blansko at an altitude of 255 m above sea level. It has about 1,400 inhabitants.

== History ==
The first written mention of the village dates back to 1342.

In the mid-14th century, Nosálovice was divided into several parts, which were united by the Staré Brno monastery of Králové. There was a monastery courtyard here, which, although alienated, still belonged to the monastery in 1481.

Originally its own municipality, Nosálovice became part of Vyškov in 1950.

== Demographics ==
Historical population

Year	Pop.	±%
1869	394	—
1880	368	−6.6%
1890	399	+8.4%
1900	475	+19.0%
1910	671	+41.3%

Year	Pop.	±%
1921	842	+25.5%
1930	883	+4.9%
1950	801	−9.3%
1961	926	+15.6%
1970	1,300	+40.4%

Year	Pop.	±%
1980	1,604	+23.4%
1991	1,807	+12.7%
2001	1,583	−12.4%
2011	1,507	−4.8%
2021	1,383	−8.2%

Source: Censuses

== Monuments ==
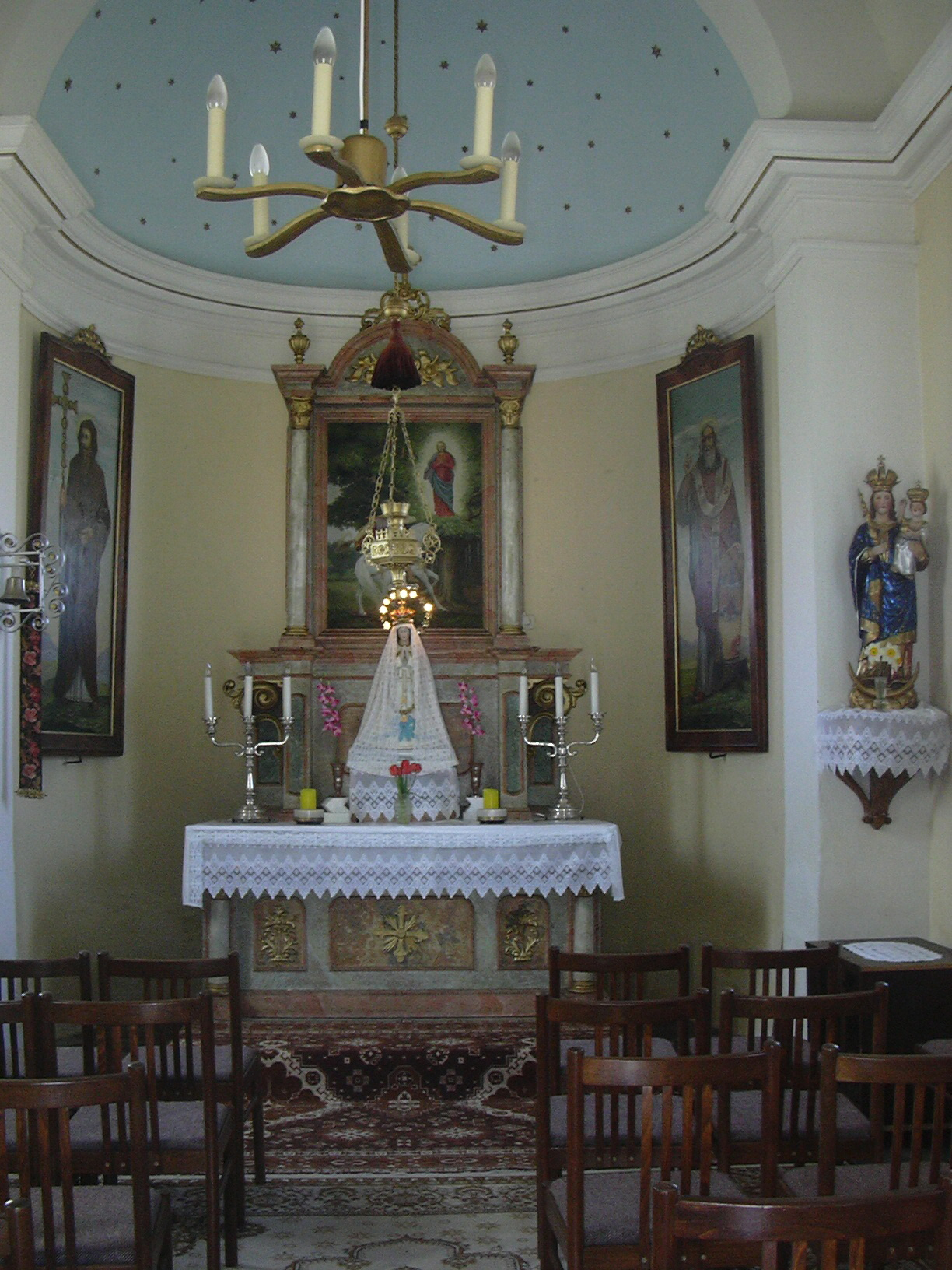
Interior of the chapel of Virgin Mary of Vranov

- Chapel of Virgin Mary of Vranov on the village square
- Boží muka column shrine at the railway crossing
- A stone cross from 1896 in front of the chapel
- A stone cross on Purkyňova street
- A stone cross from 1896 at the intersection of Purkyňova and Nosálovská streets
