= Lhota (Vyškov) =

- Municipal part of Vyškov
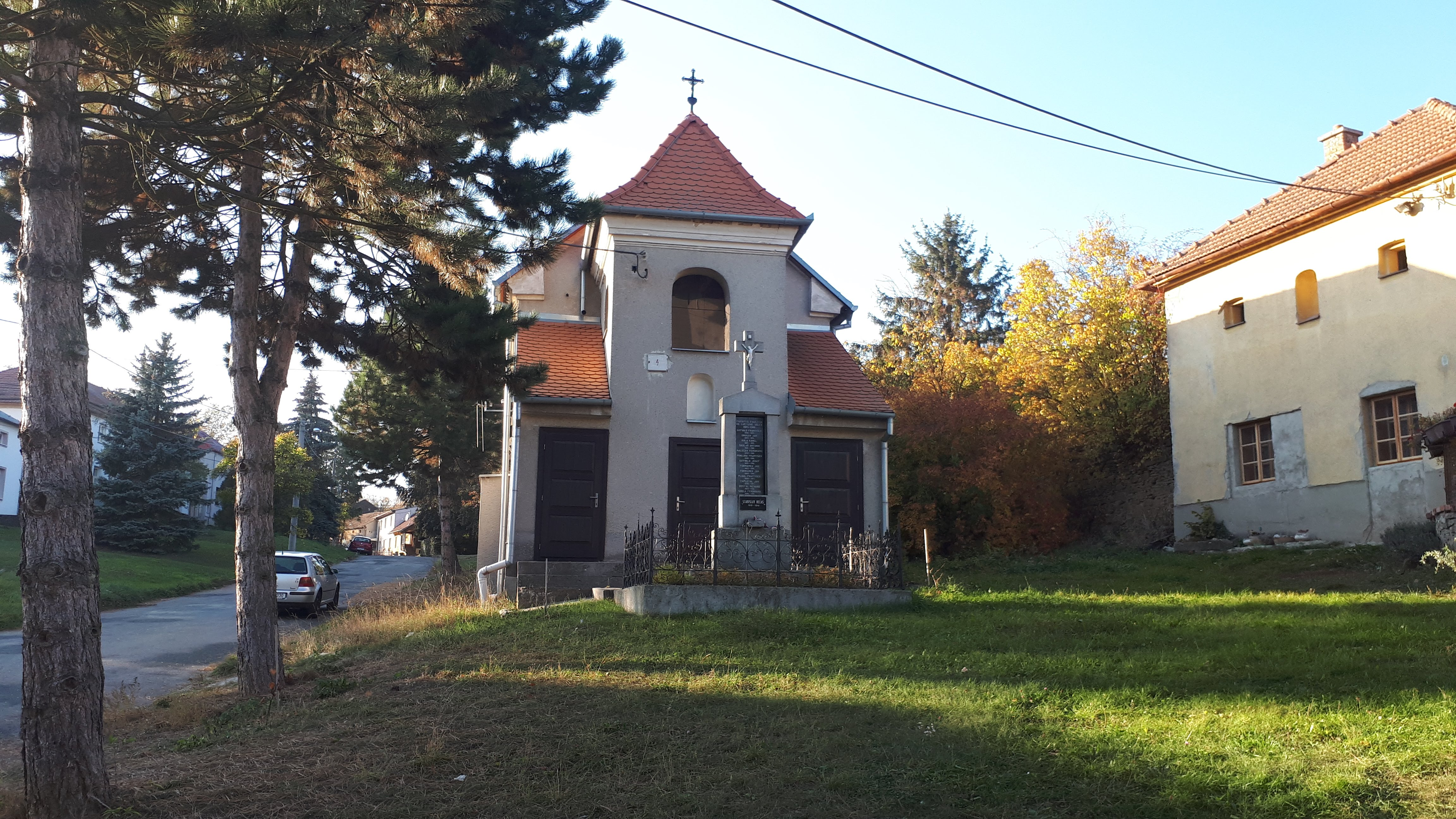
- Chapel in Lhota
- Interactive map of Lhota
- Country: Czech Republic
- Region: South Moravian Region
- District: Vyškov
- Municipality: Vyškov

Area
  - Total: 2.35 km^{2} (0.91 sq mi)

Population (2021)
  - Total: 368
  - Density: 157/km^{2} (406/sq mi)
- Time zone: UTC+1 (CET)
  - Summer (DST): UTC+2 (CEST)
- Postal code: 682 01

Lhota is a village and municipal part of Vyškov, a town in Vyškov District of the South Moravian Region of the Czech Republic. It has about 370 inhabitants.

It is located 6 kilometres (3.7 mi) northwest of Vyškov and 28 kilometres (17 mi) from Brno.

== History ==
Lhota and other villages with the same name were founded during the 13th and first half of the 14th centuries. The inhabitants of these villages were exempted from all wages for a certain period of time, i.e. a period (in Old Czech lhóta, meaning 'grace period') for cutting down the forest and turning it into fields.

During the German occupation in 1941, the inhabitants of 33 municipalities were evicted from the Drahany Highlands, including Lhota, only allowed to return after in 1945. Of the 129 homes, 25 were destroyed and 70 badly damaged.

The village was merged with Rychtářov in 1964, both of which then became part of Vyškov in 1986.

== Demographics ==
Historical population

Year	Pop.	±%
1869	390	—
1880	416	+6.7%
1890	455	+9.4%
1900	466	+2.4%
1910	520	+11.6%

Year	Pop.	±%
1921	493	−5.2%
1930	539	+9.3%
1950	307	−43.0%
1961	362	+17.9%
1970	344	−5.0%

Year	Pop.	±%
1980	328	−4.7%
1991	348	+6.1%
2001	356	+2.3%
2011	352	−1.1%
2021	368	+4.5%

Source: Censuses

== Culture ==
For cultural purposes, Lhota uses a partially reconstructed Sokol building located in the upper part of the settlement on a hill, founded in 1919. The Sokol organization manages the building, including a pub and a sports field, and hosts various events for all ages, like camps, tournaments, trips and easter events.

== Monuments ==
- Monument to the memory of those who died in World War I in front of the bell tower - The names of 13 victims immortalized on the monument.
- Columb shrine at the school from the early 19th century
- Bell tower on the village square
- A cast iron cross built in 1891, in memory of the deceased Karel Kilián
- Stone cross for the honor and greater glory of God from 1897.
- Archaeological site of the extinct settlement of Lipina

== Notable people ==
- Oldřich Skácel (1908-2002), colonel in World War II, was born here
- František Uhlíř (1900-1980) politician and interwar and postwar deputy for the Czechoslovak National Socialist Party, in exile after 1949
