= Rychtářov =

- Municipal part of Vyškov
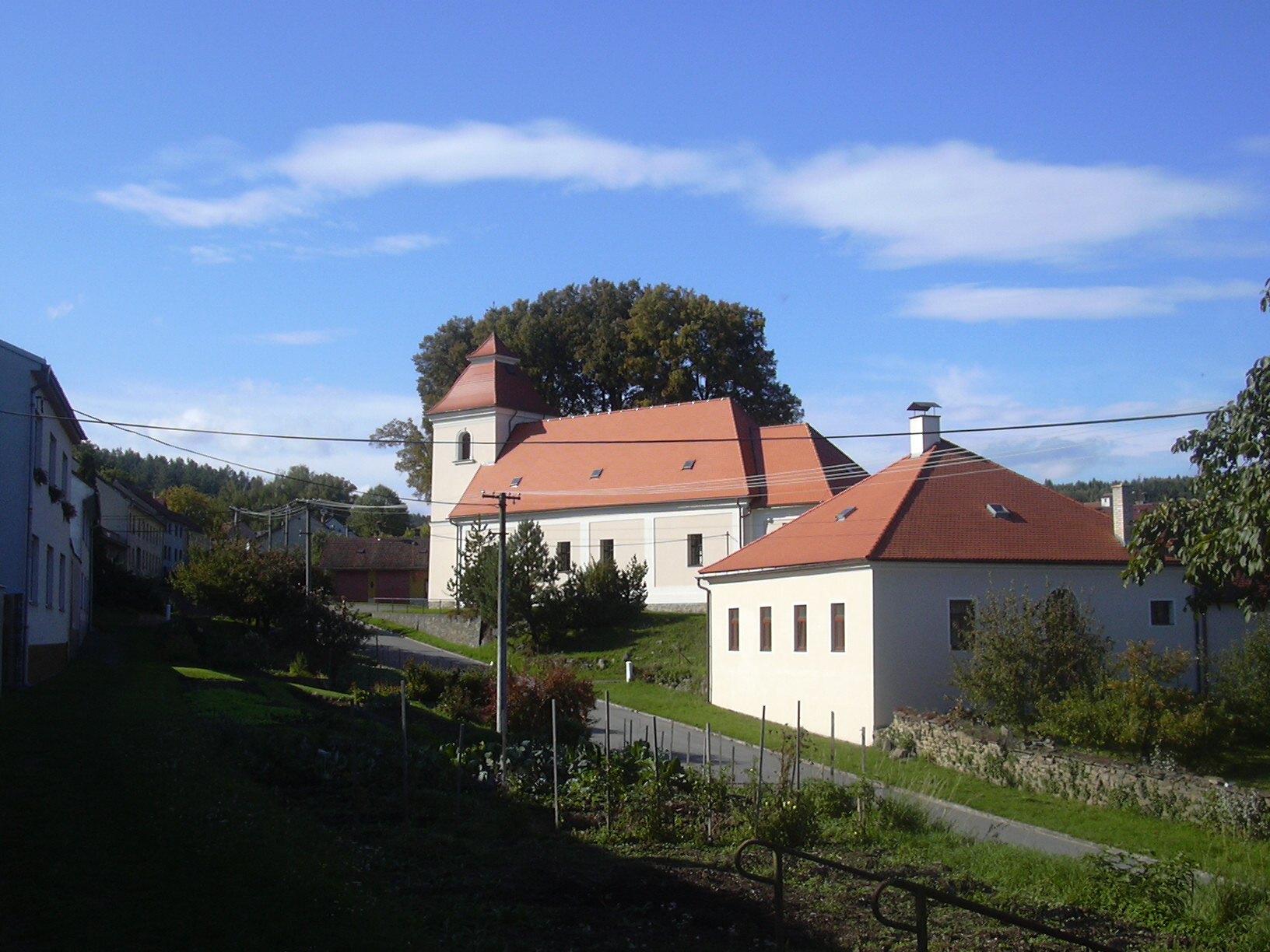
- Church of the Assumption of the Virgin Mary
- Interactive map of Rychtářov
- Country: Czech Republic
- Region: South Moravian Region
- District: Vyškov
- Municipality: Vyškov

Area
  - Total: 11.58 km^{2} (4.47 sq mi)

Population (2021)
  - Total: 576
  - Density: 49.7/km^{2} (129/sq mi)
- Time zone: UTC+1 (CET)
  - Summer (DST): UTC+2 (CEST)
- Postal code: 682 01

Rychtářov (German: Richtersdorf) is a village and municipal part of the town of Vyškov in Vyškov District of the South Moravian Region of the Czech Republic. Located approximately 10 kilometres (6 mi) north of Vyškov and 27 kilometres (17 mi) north-east of Brno, it lies at an altitude of 401 m above sea level. Rychtářov has a population of 576 as of the 2021 census.

== Etymology ==
The name of the village of Rychtářov probably comes from the personal name Rychtář, which would indicate "Rychtář's property". The first written mention from 1381 mentions the name Rechtářov, but in documents from 1460, 1537 and 1558 the form Dechtářov appears. This suggests the possibility that the origin of the name is related to the general term dehtář, i.e. "tar producer".

The exact time and reason for the name change are unknown. There is a theory that the change may have occurred due to an incorrect transcription or incorrect reading of the letters R and D in contemporary documents. Another possibility is a connection with the introduction of German law and the system of regents in the 12th century, when Rychtářov could have acquired a name according to its administrative status.

== History ==
The first written mention of Rychtářov dates back to 1381, where the village was mentioned in the dowry deed of Anna, wife of Peter of Šternberk, under the name "Rechtarow".

In the 18th and 19th centuries, the village underwent gradual economic and administrative development. Land registers were introduced and property changes took place as part of Maria Theresa's reforms. In 1855, a cholera epidemic hit Rychtářov, claiming 48 lives. Many families died out completely, which led to the decision to establish a new cemetery outside the church grounds. In 1883, a post office was established here, which improved the village's connection with Vyškov and other settlements.

At the turn of the 19th and 20th centuries, the infrastructure was further developed - a new municipal school, a municipal inn and a sawmill were built. In 1913, electric lighting was introduced in the village, which contributed to the modernization and improvement of living conditions. After World War I, a parquet and joinery machine shop was established in Rychtářov, which brought job opportunities to local residents.

During the German occupation in 1941, the inhabitants of 33 municipalities were evicted from the Drahany Highlands, including Rychtářov, in connection with the expansion of the military area and the village remained almost abandoned. After the end of World War II and the occupation in 1945, the original inhabitants were able to return and the village's reconstruction began.

During the socialist era, an agricultural cooperative was founded in Rychtářov, which led to the mechanization of agriculture, but also to a change in traditional farming. In 1961, it merged with Lhota to form the municipality of Rychtářov-Lhota, which became a part of Vyškov in 1986.

== Demographics ==
Historical population

Year	Pop.	±%
1869	672	—
1880	677	+0.7%
1890	742	+9.6%
1900	723	−2.6%
1910	738	+2.1%

Year	Pop.	±%
1921	691	−6.4%
1930	757	+9.6%
1950	475	−37.3%
1961	582	+22.5%
1970	528	−9.3%

Year	Pop.	±%
1980	568	+7.6%
1991	561	−1.2%
2001	570	+1.6%
2011	538	−5.6%
2021	576	+7.1%

Source: Censuses

== Monuments ==
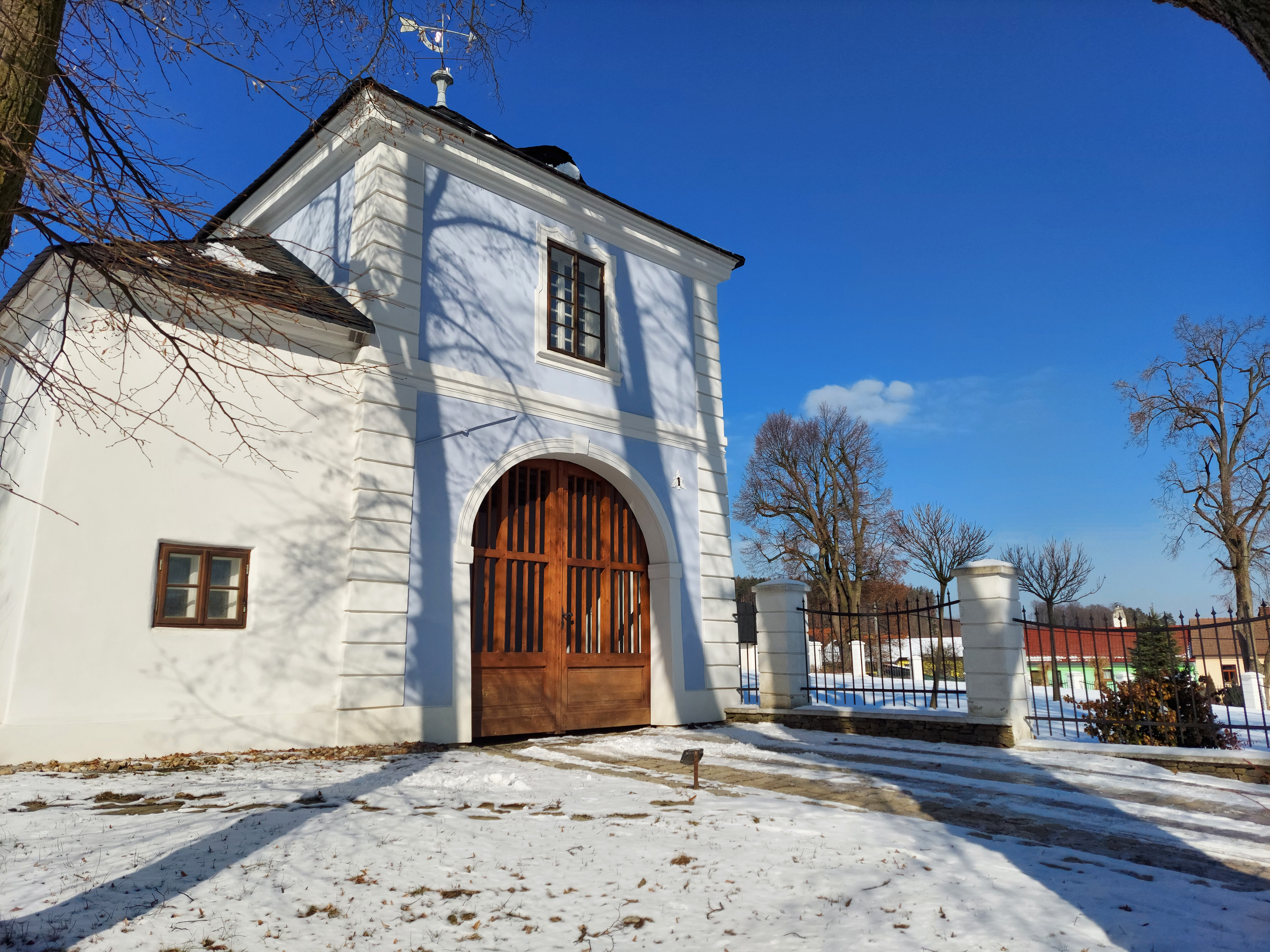
Troyerstein hunting lodge

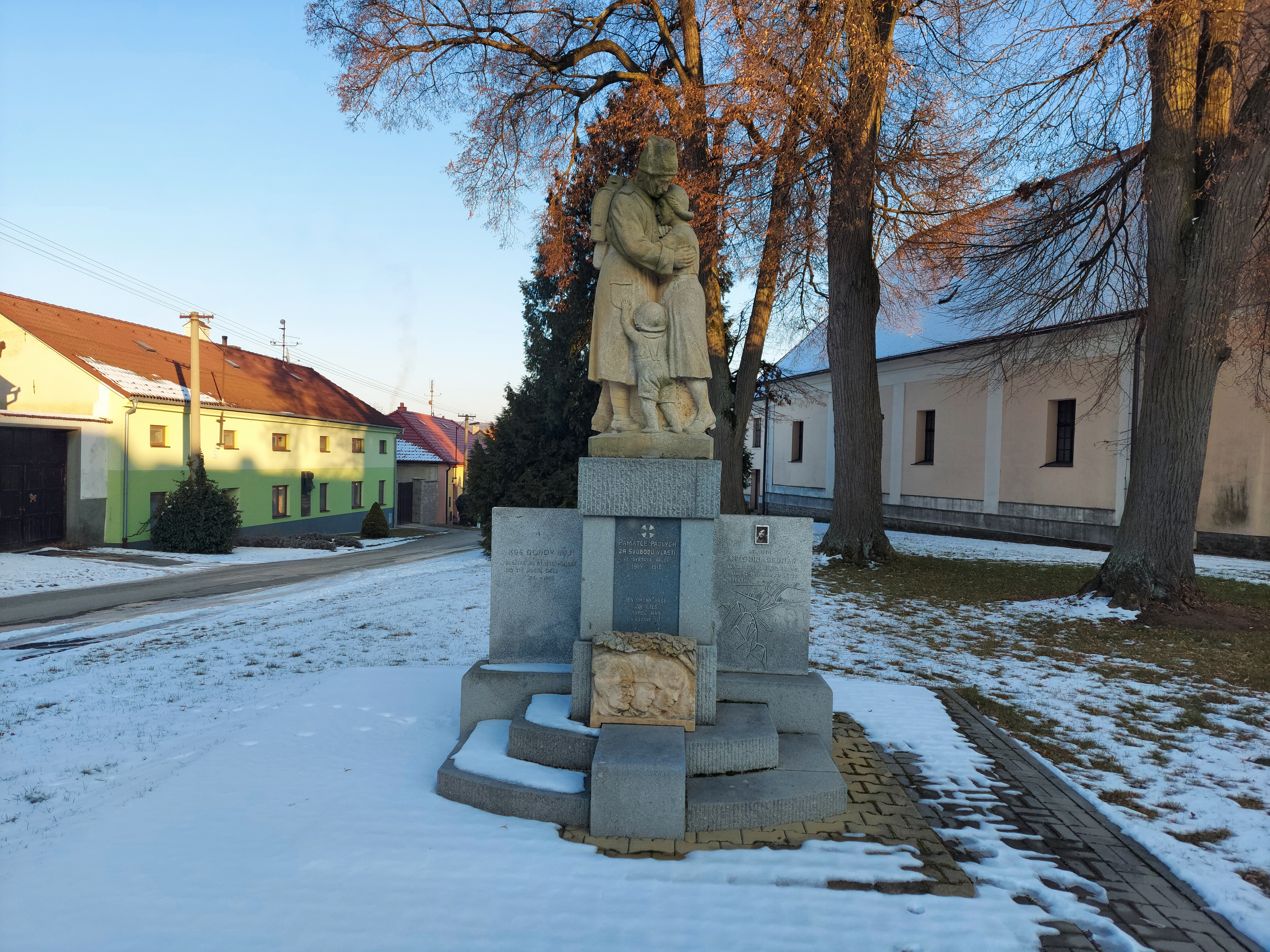
Monument to fallen soldiers

- Church of the Assumption of the Virgin Mary
- Troyerstein hunting lodge
- Childhood house of known resident Alois Musil with a memorial plaque, house num. 14
- Musa Villa - built by Alois Musil
- Ruins of Kuchlov Castle
- Ruins of Stagnov Castle
- Remains of the Na valech ('On the ramparts') hillfort
- Boží muka column shrine
- Monument to the fallen soldiers of World War I and World War II

== Notable people ==
- Alois Musil (1868-1944), theologian, orientalist, explorer and writer
