= Opatovice (Vyškov) =

- Municipal part of Vyškov
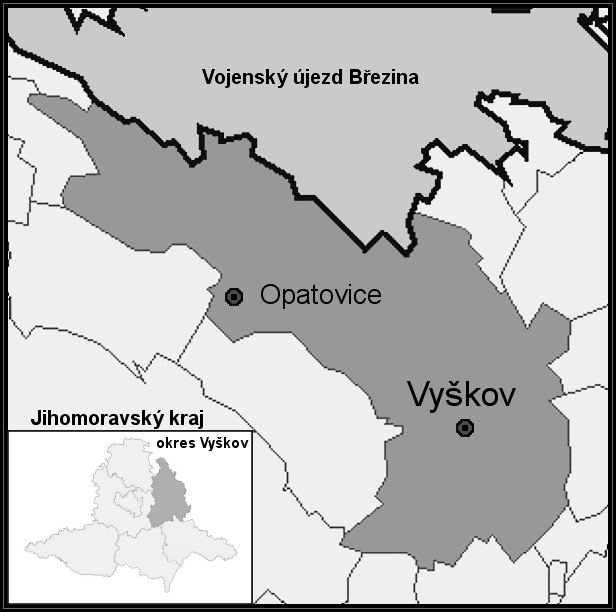
- Location of Opatovice within Vyškov
- Interactive map of Opatovice
- Country: Czech Republic
- Region: South Moravian Region
- District: Vyškov
- Municipality: Vyškov

Area
  - Total: 5.95 km^{2} (2.30 sq mi)

Population (2021)
  - Total: 380
  - Density: 64/km^{2} (170/sq mi)
- Time zone: UTC+1 (CET)
  - Summer (DST): UTC+2 (CEST)
- Postal code: 682 01

Opatovice is a village and municipal part of Vyškov, a town in Vyškov District of the South Moravian Region of the Czech Republic. It has about 380 inhabitants.

It is located 4 kilometres (2.5 mi) northwest of Vyškov and 28 kilometres (17 mi) from Brno.

== History ==
The first known mention of Opatovice dates back to 1376. The oldest known history is connected with the Dědice and Račice estates, which extended over the territory of today's Opatovice.

During the German occupation in 1941, the inhabitants of 33 municipalities were evicted from the Drahany Highlands, including Opatovice, only allowed to return after in 1945. The population declined by a third, from 683 in 1941 to 457 in 1950.

Opatovice became a part of Vyškov in 1980.

== Demographics ==
Historical population

Year	Pop.	±%
1869	565	—
1880	625	+10.6%
1890	614	−1.8%
1900	601	−2.1%
1910	635	+5.7%

Year	Pop.	±%
1921	634	−0.2%
1930	603	−4.9%
1950	457	−24.2%
1961	473	+3.5%
1970	472	−0.2%

Year	Pop.	±%
1980	438	−7.2%
1991	343	−21.7%
2001	335	−2.3%
2011	374	+11.6%
2021	380	+1.6%

Source: Censuses

== Religion ==
Opatovice belongs to the seat of the Roman Catholic parish of Vyškov-Dědice. It is part of the Vyškov deanery of the Roman Catholic Archdiocese of Olomouc. The territory of the local parish includes not only the area of Dědice and Opatovice, but also the settlements of Hamiltony, Pazderna, Lhota, Radslavice and Radslavičky. The main spiritual center of the parish is the Church of the Holy Trinity in the center of Dědice.

== Sport ==
A Sokol building has served Opatovice since 1920. It mainly hosts football events, alongside football tennis, tourism, and cycling.

== Monuments ==
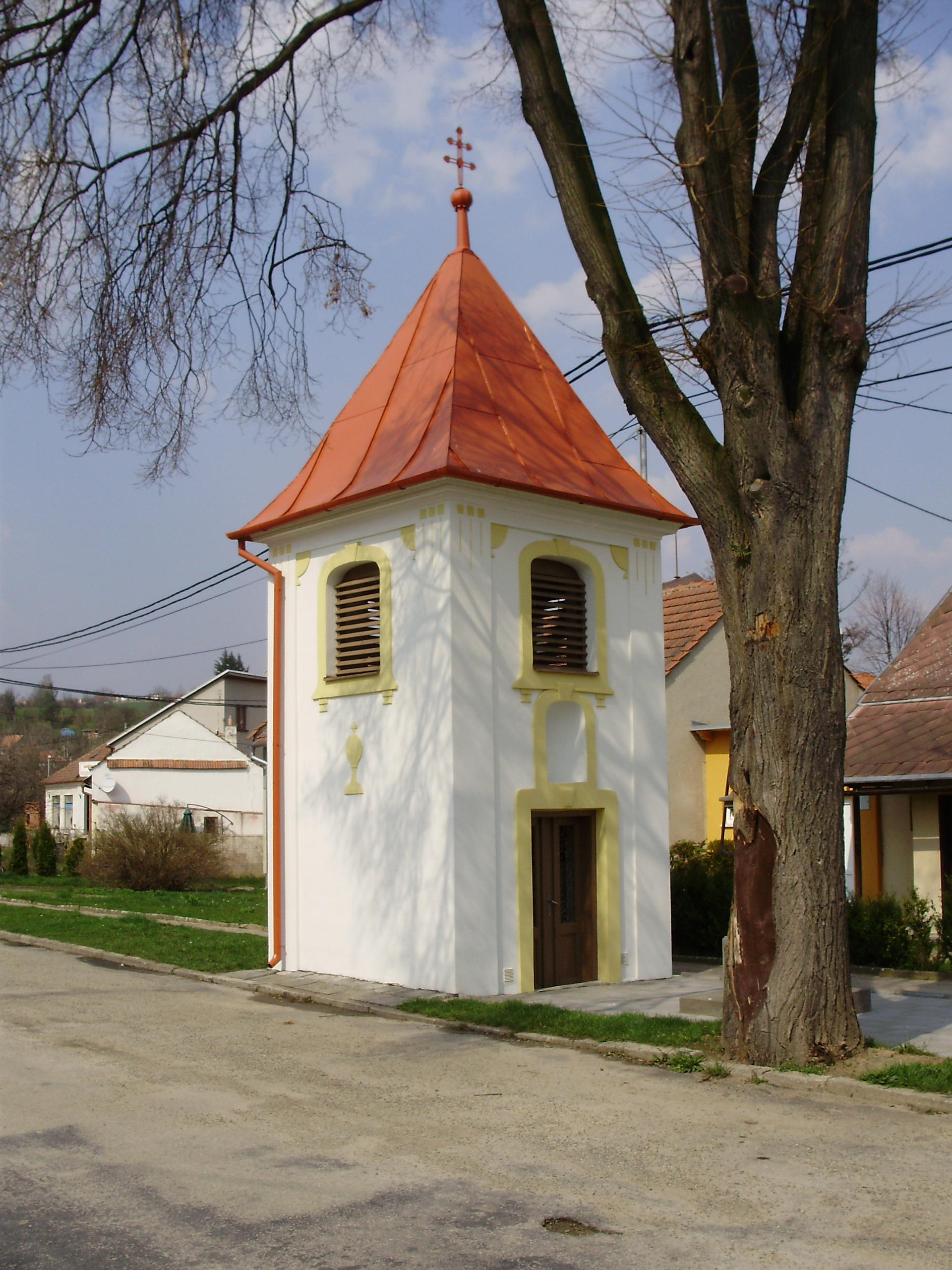
Bell tower

- Baroque bell tower - stands in the middle of the village square and was built in the second half of the 18th century. Inside the bell tower is a simple altar with a porcelain statue of the Virgin Mary.
- Cross in front of the bell tower, built in 1877
- Monument dedicated to those who died in World War I
- Chapel of John of Nepomuk between a dam and Opatovice
- Opatovice reservoir - a waterworks created by flooding about 70 hectares of the valley of the Haná river, completed in 1972. Approximately 2 million m³ of water are withdrawn from the reservoir's storage volume annually for treatment into drinking water for the Vyškov and Bučovice areas.

== Notable people ==
- František Kolařík (1867-1927), composer
- Antonín Tučapský (1928-2014), leader of the Moravian teachers' choir association
- František Zabloudil (1910-1990), Royal Air Force pilot, resistance fighter during World War II
- Bohumír Fürst (1909-1978), Royal Air Force pilot, resistance fighter during World War II
- Jan Kozár (1933-2009), Roman Catholic priest
