= Hamiltony =

- Municipal part of Vyškov
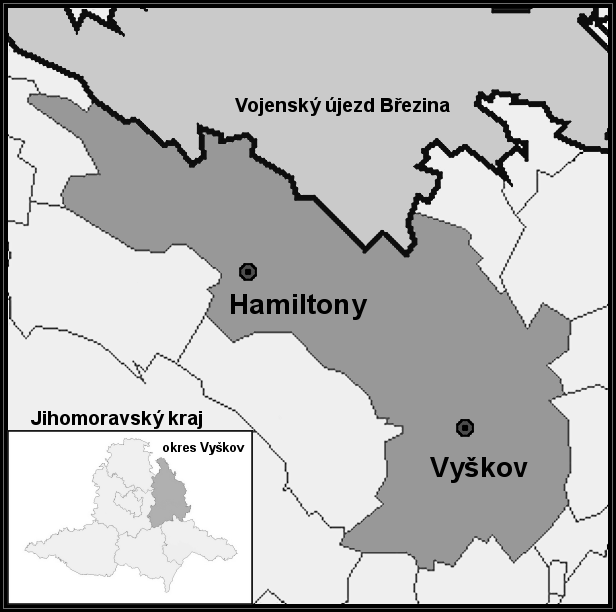
- Location of Hamiltony within Vyškov
- Interactive map of Hamiltony
- Country: Czech Republic
- Region: South Moravian Region
- District: Vyškov
- Municipality: Vyškov

Area
  - Total: 2.05 km^{2} (0.79 sq mi)

Population (2021)
  - Total: 367
  - Density: 179/km^{2} (464/sq mi)
- Time zone: UTC+1 (CET)
  - Summer (DST): UTC+2 (CEST)
- Postal code: 682 02

Hamiltony is a village and municipal part of Vyškov, a town in Vyškov District of the South Moravian Region of the Czech Republic. It has about 370 inhabitants.

It is located in a narrow valley of the Haná river, 4 kilometres (2.5 mi) northwest of Vyškov and 28 kilometres (17 mi) from Brno.

== History ==
Hamiltony was named after the Maximilian Reichsgraf von Hamilton, prince-bishop of Olomouc from 1761 to 1776, under whom the village was founded. Its original name was Hamiltonky until 1784.

In the mid-19th century, the village was known as Hamilton, which later changed to the current name Hamiltony. Hamiltony, like Pazderna, was a settlement of the town of Dědice. In 1941, it became a part of Vyškov. After the separation in 1945, it was a municipality until 1949, when it again became a part of Vyškov.

== Demographics ==
Historical population

Year	Pop.	±%
1869	250	—
1880	297	+18.8%
1890	351	+18.2%
1900	374	+6.6%
1910	451	+20.6%

Year	Pop.	±%
1921	478	+6.0%
1930	476	−0.4%
1950	414	−13.0%
1961	432	+4.3%
1970	377	−12.7%

Year	Pop.	±%
1980	332	−11.9%
1991	312	−6.0%
2001	326	+4.5%
2011	372	+14.1%
2021	367	−1.3%

Source: Censuses

== Religion ==
Hamiltony is affiliated with the Roman Catholic parish of Vyškov-Dědice. It is part of the Vyškov deanery of the Archdiocese of Olomouc. The territory of the local parish includes not only the area of Hamiltony itself, but also the settlements of Pazderna, Lhota, Opatovice, Radslavice and Radslavičky. The main spiritual center of the parish is the Church of the Holy Trinity in the center of Dědice.

Every year on 5 July, a church pilgrimage takes place here.

== Monuments ==
- Chapel of Saints Cyril and Methodius, nicknamed Strachotínka, built in 1871
- Ruins of the Dědice castle
