= Anna Maria Achenrainer =

Austrian writer

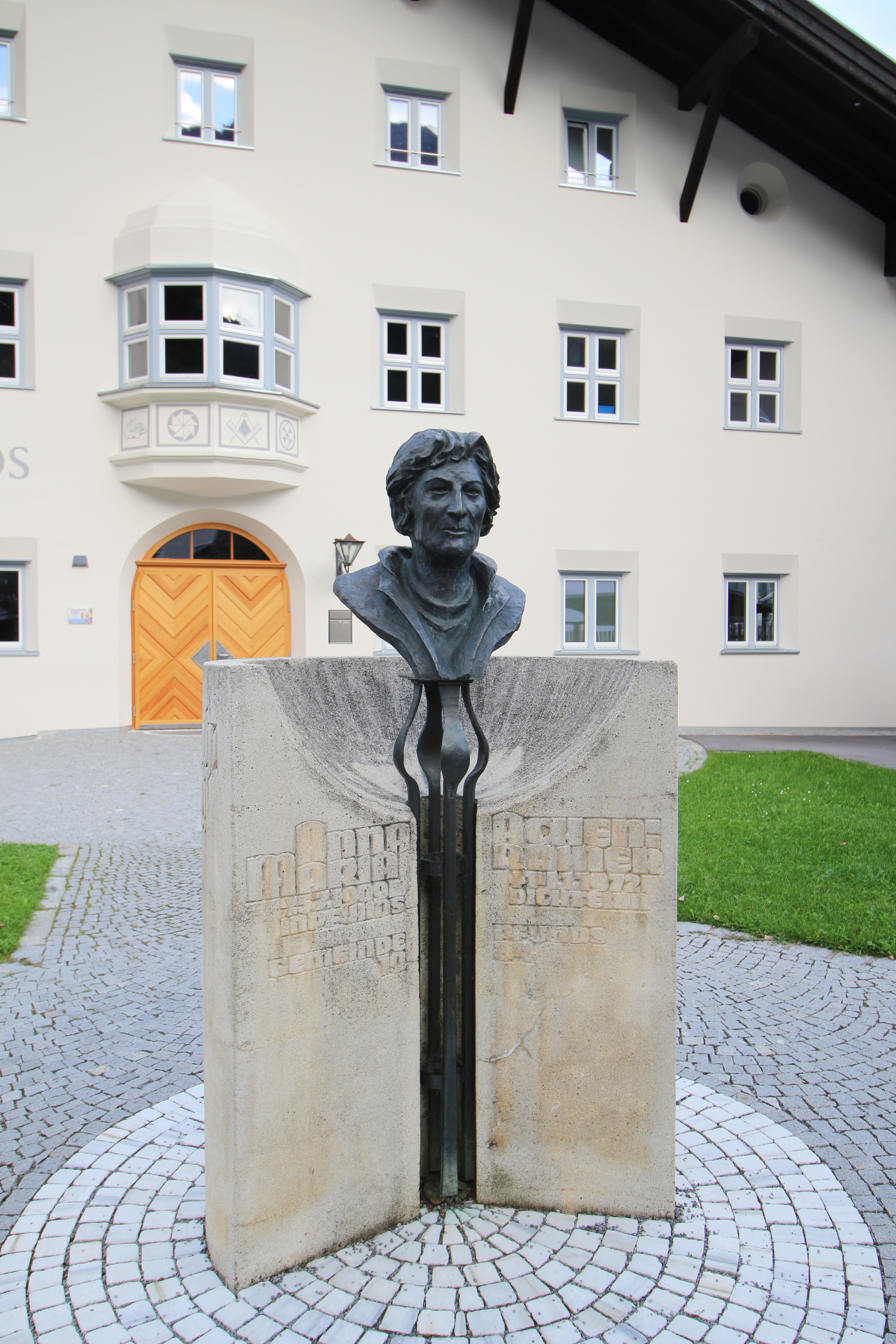
Monument to Anna Maria Achenrainer, Pfunds, Tyrol

Anna Maria Achenrainer (5 July 1909 – 14 January 1972) was an Austrian writer.

== Life ==
Achenrainer was born in Pfunds. Her father died in World War I and she was taken to an orphanage.

Achenrainer learnt teaching in Innsbruck, where she started publishing her poems in the magazine Tiroler Volksboten, and she was also one of the founders of the literacy association Turmbund.

Achenrainer died in Innsbruck on 14 January 1972, and her tomb is in a cemetery of Mühlau, Innsbruck.

== Prizes ==
- 1950: Grand Austrian State Prize (Großer Österreichischer Staatspreis ) for Appassionata
- 1970: Order of Merit of the State of Tyrol ( Verdienstkreuz des Landes Tirol)

== Works ==
- Appassionata. Gedichte. Inn, Innsbruck, 1950
- Der zwölfblättrige Lotos. Gedichte. Egger, Imst, 1957
- Der grüne Kristall. Gedichte. Mit Linolschnitten von Margarethe Krieger. S. Gideon, Gießen, 1960
- Die Windrose. Gedichte. Rohrer, Vienna and Innsbruck, 1962
- Das geflügelte Licht. Gedichte. Mit Rohrfederzeichnungen von Rudolf Kreuzer. Wagner, Innsbruck, 1963
- Frauenbildnisse aus Tirol. 21 Biographien. Wagner, Innsbruck, 1964
- Horizonte der Hoffnung. Gedichte. Eingeleitet und ausgewählt von Franz Hölbing. Stiasny, Graz, 1966
- Lob des Dunkels und des Lichts. Gedichte. ÖVA, Vienna, 1968
- Zeit der Sonnenuhren. Ein Jahrbuch. Karlsruher Bote, Karlsruhe, 1969
- Antonia van Mer. Erzählung. ÖVA, Vienna, 1972

== Sources ==
- Deutsches Literatur-Lexikon. Biographisch-bibliographisches Handbuch. 3., völlig neu bearbeitete Auflage. Hg. Wilhelm Kosch (Begr.), Hubert Herkommer and Konrad Feilchenfeldt. Francke, Bern und München, 1968 Band 1, Seite 7
- Elisabeth Pfurtscheller: Anna Maria Achenrainer (1909 - 1972). Die Stellung der Lyrikerin im Tiroler Literatur- und Kulturbetrieb der 50er und 60er Jahre, dargestellt anhand ihres Nachlasses. Universität Innsbruck, 2006
- Paul Wimmer: Wegweiser durch die Literatur Tirols seit 1945. Bläschke, Darmstadt, 1978 Seite 22ff.
