= Němčice nad Hanou =

- Town
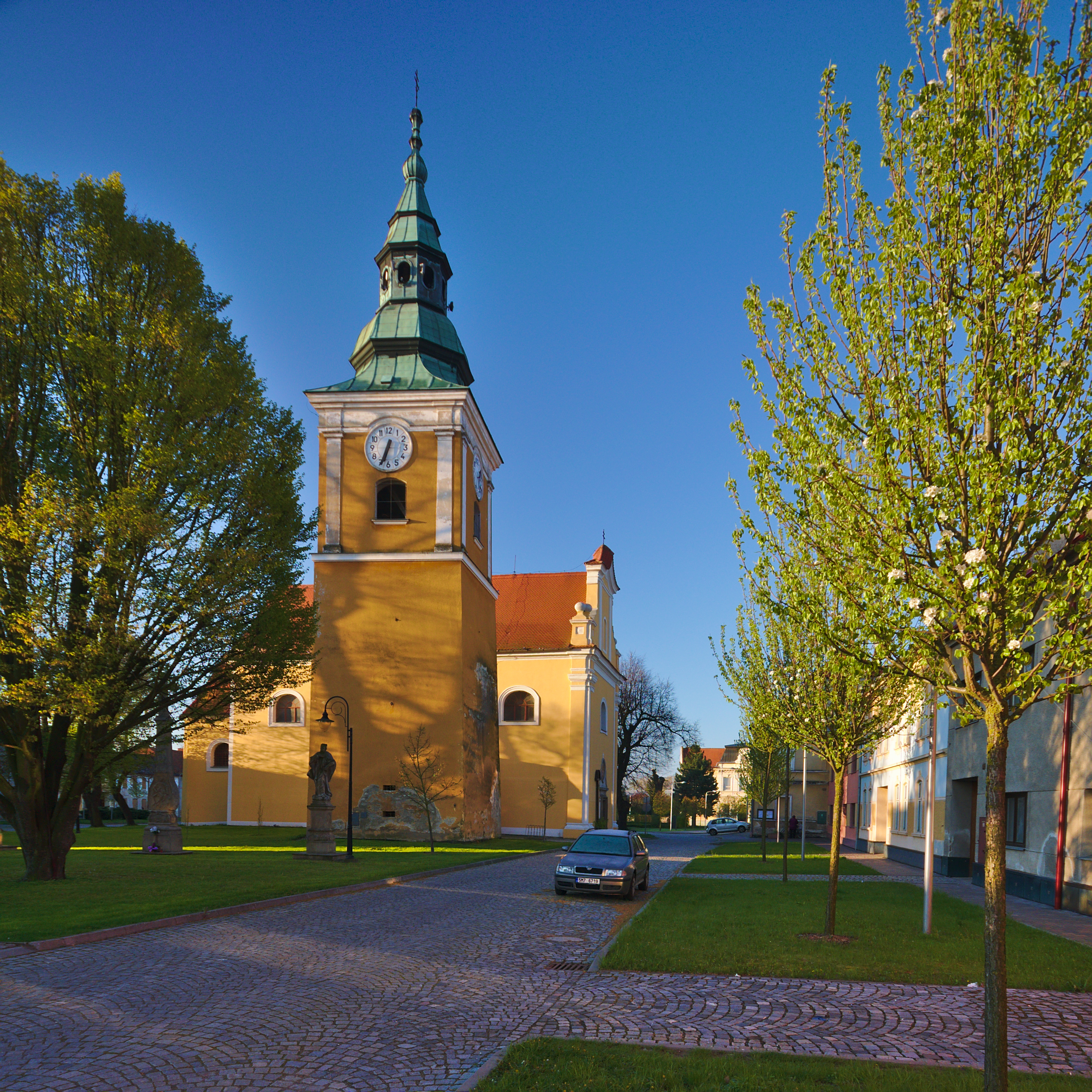
- Church of Saint Mary Magdalene

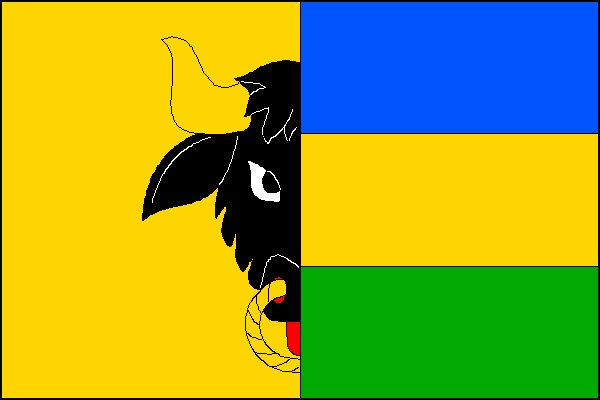
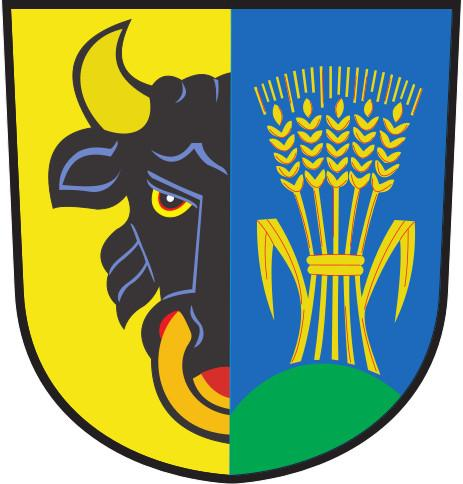
- Flag Coat of arms

- Location in the Czech Republic
- Coordinates: 49°20′31″N 17°12′22″E
- Country: Czech Republic
- Region: Olomouc
- District: Prostějov
- First mentioned: 1406

Government
  - Mayor: Martin Ernst

Area
  - Total: 12.06 km^{2} (4.66 sq mi)
- Elevation: 204 m (669 ft)

Population (2026-01-01)
  - Total: 1,902
  - Density: 157.7/km^{2} (408.5/sq mi)
- Time zone: UTC+1 (CET)
  - Summer (DST): UTC+2 (CEST)
- Postal code: 798 27
- Website: www.nemcicenh.cz

Němčice nad Hanou (Czech pronunciation: [ˈɲɛmtʃɪtsɛ ˈnad ɦanou]; German: Niemtschitz an der Hanna) is a town in Prostějov District in the Olomouc Region of the Czech Republic. It has about 1,900 inhabitants.

== Geography ==
Němčice nad Hanou is located about 15 kilometres (9 mi) southeast of Prostějov and 27 km (17 mi) south of Olomouc. It lies mostly in an agricultural landscape of the Upper Morava Valley, only the southwestern tip of the municipal territory extends into the Vyškov Gate. The Haná River flows along the southern municipal border.

== History ==
The area was already inhabited in the La Tène period. The Celtic settlement in Němčice nad Hanou belongs to the most important archaeological sites in Moravia with many valuable finds.

The first written mention of Němčice nad Hanou is from 1406. In 1563, during the rule of the Pernštejn family, the village was promoted to a market town by Emperor Ferdinand I. Němčice nad Hanou became a town in 1970.

== Demographics ==
Historical population

Year	Pop.	±%
1869	1,087	—
1880	1,187	+9.2%
1890	1,302	+9.7%
1900	1,373	+5.5%
1910	1,756	+27.9%

Year	Pop.	±%
1921	1,853	+5.5%
1930	1,983	+7.0%
1950	1,826	−7.9%
1961	2,094	+14.7%
1970	2,035	−2.8%

Year	Pop.	±%
1980	2,221	+9.1%
1991	2,055	−7.5%
2001	2,110	+2.7%
2011	1,996	−5.4%
2021	1,854	−7.1%

Source: Censuses

== Transport ==
Němčice nad Hanou is located on the railway line Olomouc–Vyškov.

== Culture ==
Němčice nad Hanou lies in the ethnographic region of Haná.

== Sights ==
The main landmark of the town is the Church of Saint Mary Magdalene. It was built in the Baroque style in 1662.

== Notable people ==
- Martin Ferdinand Quadal (1736–1811), Moravian-Austrian painter and engraver
- Andreas Ignaz Wawruch (1772–1842), Austrian medical doctor
