= Deutsches Theater-Lexikon =

German encyclopedia

The Deutsche Theater-Lexikon is, according to its subtitle, a "biography and bibliography manual". The encyclopedia lists stage actors from the German-speaking area.

The Deutsche Nationalbibliothek leads the Deutsche Theater-Lexikon under the citation form "Kosch Theater" in the list of the "Fachliche Nachschlagewerke for the Integrated Authority File“.

== History ==
The handbook was founded in 1953 by Wilhelm Kosch and was continued from the third volume by Hanspeter Bennwitz and Ingrid Bigler-Marschall. From 1953 to 2012, seven volumes were published (from Vol. 1: A-Hurk to Vol. 7: Wolbring-Zysset), plus three supplementary volumes since 2012 (as of November 2015).

Until the second volume, the work was published by Kleinmayr (Klagenfurt and Vienna). The following volumes were published by Verlag Francke in Bern and Verlag Saur in Zurich and Munich.

== Published volumes ==
- Vol. 1: A–Hurk, 1953
- Vol. 2: Hurka–Pallenberg, 1960
- Vol. 3: Pallenberg–Singer, 1992
- Vol. 4: Singer–Tzschoppe, 1998
- Vol. 5: Uber–Weisbach, 2004
- Vol. 6: Weisbrod–Wolansky, 2008
- Vol. 7: Wolbring–Zysset, 2012

Supplementary volumes (since 2012)

== Literature ==
- Walter Hinck: Deutsches Theater-Lexikon. In Arbitrium. Zeitschrift für Rezensionen zur germanistischen Literaturwissenschaft, Jg. 1993, Heft 2, p. 129–131 (Review of volumes 1-3, published from 1953 to 1992)
