= Pazderna (Vyškov) =

- Municipal part of Vyškov
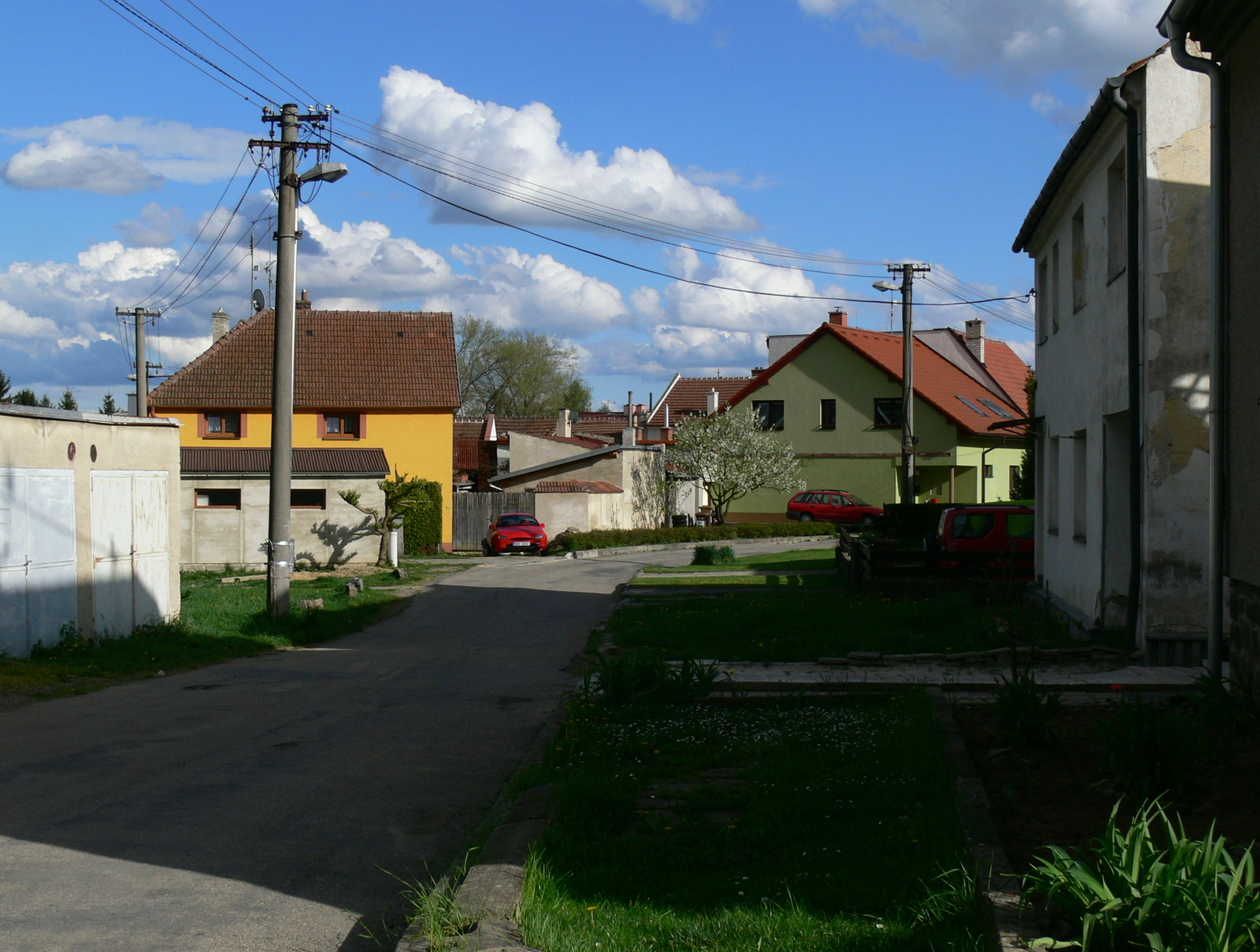
- U Splavu street
- Interactive map of Pazderna
- Country: Czech Republic
- Region: South Moravian Region
- Municipality: Vyškov

Area
  - Total: 0.12 km^{2} (0.046 sq mi)

Population (2021)
  - Total: 281
  - Density: 2,300/km^{2} (6,100/sq mi)
- Time zone: UTC+1 (CET)
  - Summer (DST): UTC+2 (CEST)
- Postal code: 682 02

Pazderna, formerly Pazderňa, is a municipal part of Vyškov, Czech Republic. Located approximately 2 kilometres (1.2 mi) northwest of the center of Vyškov, it is enclaved inside the municipal part of Dědice.

== History ==
Pazderna was founded on the Vyškov estate and the Víceměřice estate around 1760. An embryo of the village can be seen on the map of the 1st military survey carried out in the 1880s. Like Hamiltony, it was a settlement of the town of Dědice.

The drive to Tomáškův mlýn (lit. 'Tomášek's mill') began on the edge of Pazderna. The weir on the Haná river was damaged during the flood that occurred from 22 to 23 March 1931. The drive was filled in during the regulation of Haná.

== Demographics ==
Historical population

Year	Pop.	±%
1869	243	—
1880	243	+0.0%
1890	211	−13.2%
1900	199	−5.7%
1910	231	+16.1%

Year	Pop.	±%
1921	208	−10.0%
1930	215	+3.4%
1950	198	−7.9%
1961	168	−15.2%
1970	157	−6.5%

Year	Pop.	±%
1980	431	+174.5%
1991	374	−13.2%
2001	356	−4.8%
2011	310	−12.9%
2021	281	−9.4%

Source: Censuses

== Sights ==
- Chapel with a bell tower on the village square
- Cast iron cross
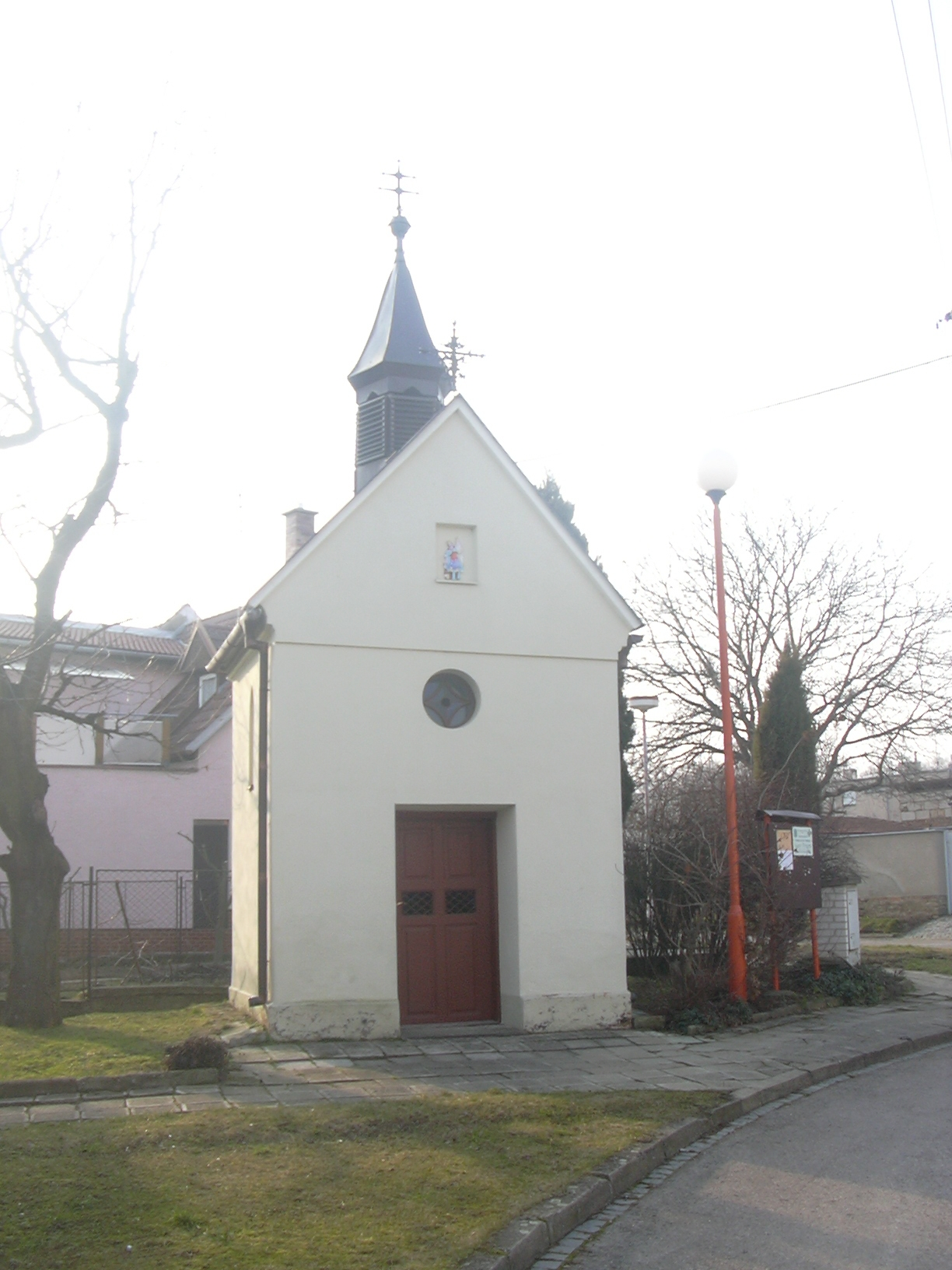
Chapel

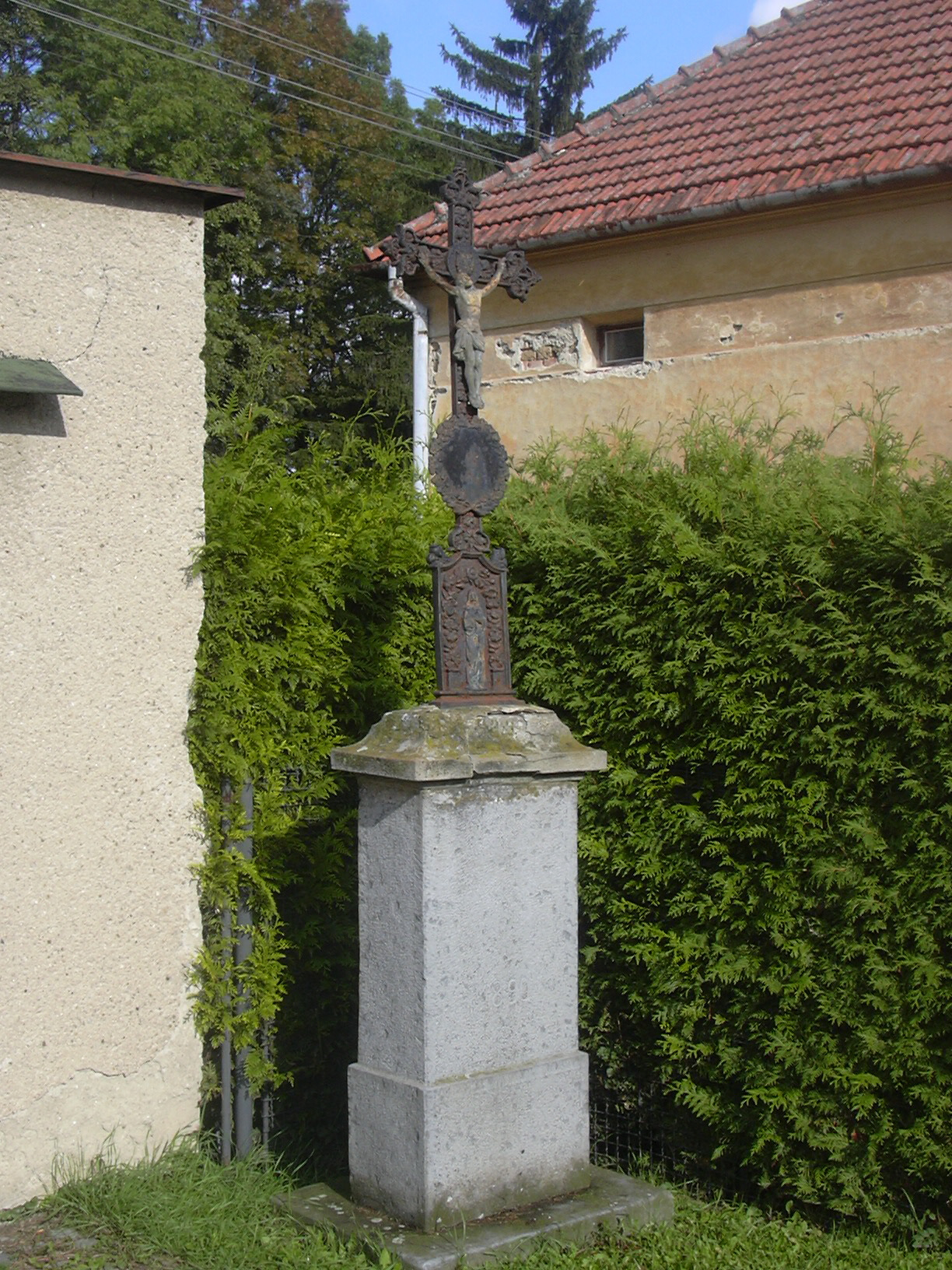
Cross
