= Hanspeter Bennwitz =

German musicologist (1930–2022)

Hanspeter Bennwitz (4 May 1930 – 20 May 2022) was a German musicologist. He was born in Dresden on 4 May 1930, and died in Mainz on 20 May 2022, at the age of 92.

== Publications ==
- Die Donaueschinger Kammermusiktage von 1921–1926. Dissertation Freiburg i.Br. 1961.
- Kleines Musiklexikon. Francke, Bern-München 1963.
- Interpretenlexikon der Instrumentalmusik. Francke, Bern/München 1964.
- Deutsches Theater-Lexikon. Biographisches und bibliographisches Handbuch von Wilhelm Kosch. Lieferung 20 und 21, Francke, Bern-München 1966 and 1971.
- with Franz Emanuel Wienert: CIEL. Ein Förderprogramm zur Elementarerziehung und seine wissenschaftlichen Voraussetzungen. Vandenhoeck, Göttingen 1973, ISBN 3-525-85352-1.
- with Georg Feder, Ludwig Finscher and Wolfgang Rehm: Musikalisches Erbe und Gegenwart. Musikergesamtausgaben in der Bundesrepublik Deutschland. Bärenreiter, Kassel/Basel 1975, ISBN 3-7618-0521-7.
- Gründungsgeschichten. Ein fiktives Tagebuch. In Festschrift 10 Jahre Gesamtschule in Mainz. Von der Bürgerinitiative zum Förderverein. Mainz 1989.
- with Gabriele Buchmeier: Christoph Willibald Gluck: Ezio (Prager Fassung von 1750). Sämtliche Werke. III/14, Bärenreiter, Kassel 1990.
- with Gabriele Buschmeier, Georg Feder, Klaus Hofmann, Wolfgang Plath: Opera Incerta. Echtheitsfragen als Problem musikwissenschaftlicher Gesamtausgaben. Steiner, Stuttgart 1991, ISBN 3-515-05996-2.
- with Gabriele Buschmeier, Albrecht Riedmüller: Komponistenbriefe des 19. Jahrhunderts. Steiner, Stuttgart 1997, ISBN 3-515-07138-5
