= Martin Ferdinand Quadal =

Czech-Austrian painter and engraver

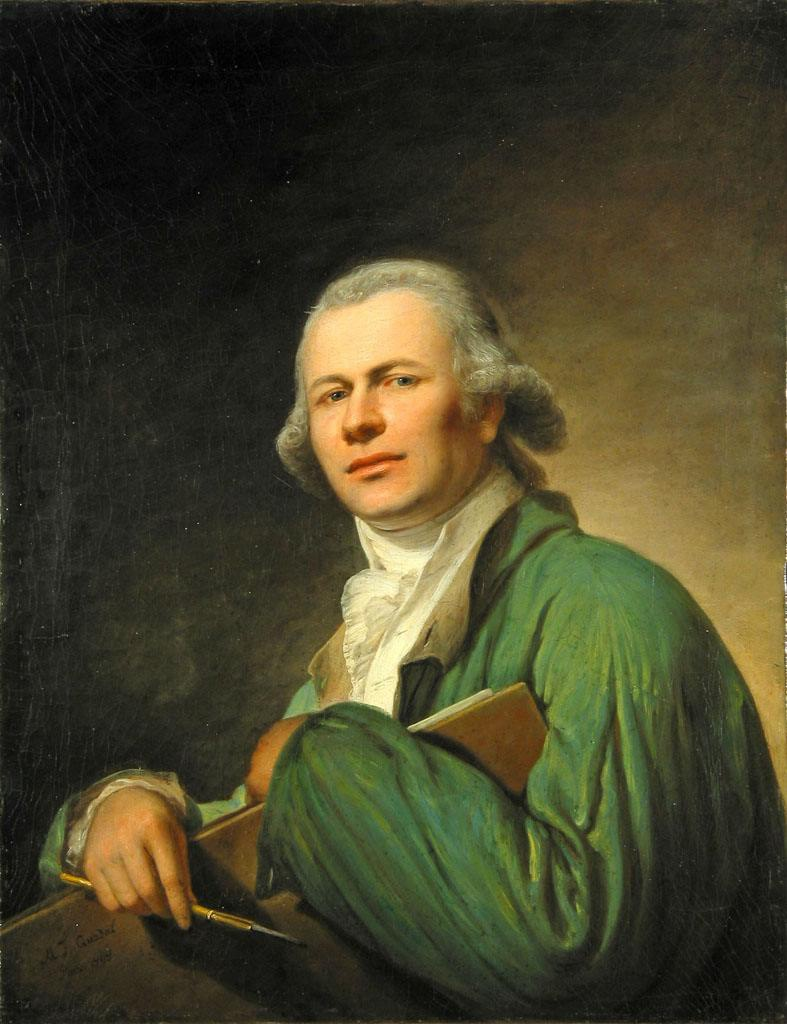
- Self-Portrait, 1798
- Born: Martin Ferdinand Quadal; 28 October 1736; Měrovice nad Hanou, Moravia
- Died: 10 January 1811 (aged 74); Saint Petersburg, Russia
- Known for: Painting, engraving, sculpture
- Movement: Austrian school

Martin Ferdinand Quadal (born Czech: Chvátal; 28 October 1736 – 10 January 1811) was a Czech-Austrian painter and engraver. Quadal is a representative of the Austrian school of painting, working all across Europe in England, Italy, Austria, Holland, Germany, France, and Russia.

== Life ==
Quadal was born on 28 October 1736 in Měrovice nad Hanou in Moravia. He came to London at an early age. He then studied painting and sculpture at the Akademie der bildenden Künste in Vienna and Paris Academy. He became a student of Francois Boucher in 1767. He was also employed by Louis Joseph, Prince de Conde and was particularly successful in France for his paintings of horses.

The painter visited France and Italy, worked at Vienna in 1787–1789. He came to Saint Petersburg in 1797 upon the invitation of Emperor Paul I and lived there until 1804. After a second visit to London, he returned to Saint Petersburg, where he died on 10 January 1811.

== Works ==
Quadal painted animal pieces, as well as military scenes, genre subjects, still lifes, and portraits. In 1779, he relocated to Dublin where he completed several paintings with animal subjects, and a number of these were brought by the Dublin Society for the use of its students. These included Studies of Dogs, Studies of Boars, Bears, Deer and Wolves, Leopards’ Heads, Deer’s Heads, Heads of Wolves, and Owls, Squirrels and Guinea Pigs, all of which are now in the National Museum on Kildare Street. During this period, he also painted a portrait of Richard, 4^{^{th}} Viscount Powerscourt, which is currently housed at Powerscourt.

From Dublin he went to London, where he exhibited four works at the Society of Artists in 1791. He etched a Group of Cats, a Child with a Dog, and Studies from Domestic and Wild Animals (London, 1793). He then visited France and Italy, lived and worked in Vienna in 1787–9, and in Saint Petersburg in 1797–1804. He became the master of the Academy of Saint Petersburg. Quadal's works are also displayed at the Pushkin Museum of Fine Arts, the State Hermitage, and the State Tretyakov Gallery.

Notable paintings by Quadal include a 1788 portrait of Emperor Joseph II with Archduke Franz; a self-portrait that is now in the RISD Museum in Providence, Rhode Island; portraits of Anna Elisabeth van Tuyl van Seeroskerken and Friedrich Gottlieb Klopstock; a portrait of the Grand Duchess Maria, daughter of Tsar Paul I, that is now in the Louvre; and an 1807 portrait of Prince Nikolai Saltykov that is now in the Hermitage in Saint Petersburg.
