= Andreas Ignaz Wawruch =

Austrian physician (1772–1842)

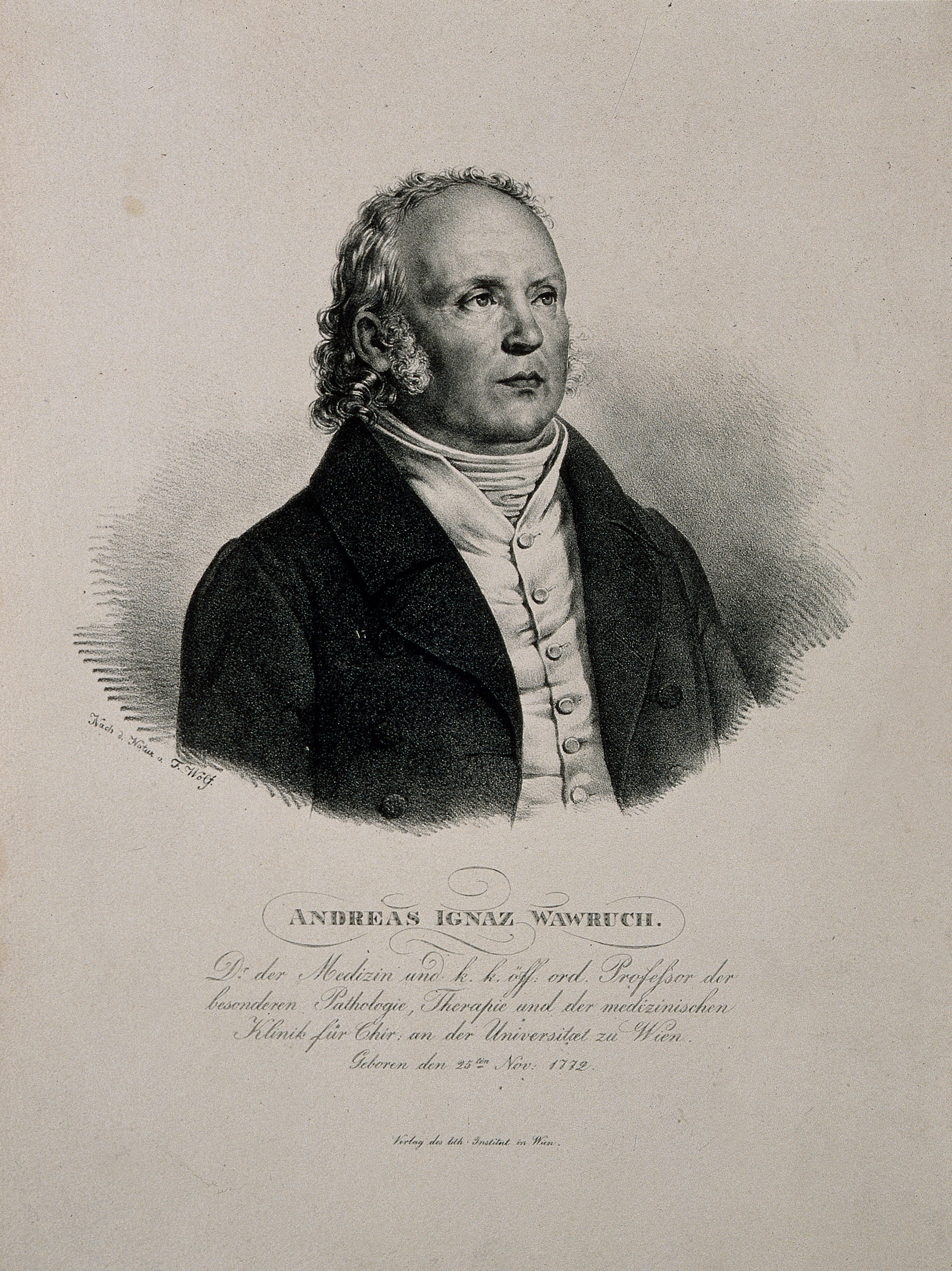
Andreas Ignaz Wawruch; Lithograph by F. Wolf

Andreas Ignaz Wawruch (Note: BLKÖ erroneously refers to him as Andreas Johann Wawruch) (25 November 1772 (Note: 1782 by some sources, including the Beethoven-Haus website; the earlier date is extensively justified by Lorenz) – 20 March 1842) was an Austrian medical doctor and university professor. He was particularly noted for his association with, and medical attendance on, Ludwig van Beethoven.

== Early life ==
Andreas Ignaz Wawruch was born on 25 November 1772 in Němčice, Moravia. He was the son of Ignaz Wawruch, a peasant farmer, and Anna Wawruch, (b. Kazyk). He was given violin and singing lessons by his uncle, Kaspar Wawruch, (a theologian and local schoolteacher) (Note: Kaspar Wawruch died a schoolteacher in the town of Tovačov in 1818.) and in 1786 was admitted to the Archbishop's Chapel at Kroměříž as a boy soprano.

== Studies ==
After earlier studies in theology, classical literature, and music, Wawruch studied medicine at the University of Prague. At the end of 1810, he became an assistant medical doctor at the University of Vienna Hospital and also a teaching assistant in pathology and pharmacology. In 1812, he received his doctorate in medicine from the University of Vienna with his dissertation "Tentamen inaugurale philologico-medicum sistens antiquitates typhi contagiosi" (tr. "An inaugural philological-medical essay on the antiquities of contagious typhus.") Shortly thereafter, he completed his habilitation there.

He married Josepha Hildenbrand (who was the daughter of his teacher, Professor Valentin von Hildenbrand (1763-1818)) on 22 October 1815 in Vienna. (Note: Alservorstadt Parish, Marriage Register Vol. 1809-17, folio 216: Josepha von Hildenbrand was born in 1791 in Western Volhynia (part of modern Ukraine), where her father was personal physician to Count Adam Mniszek.) Ignaz Schuppanzigh attested that Josephina was a talented fortepianist; Gerhard von Breuning stated that Wawruch was a gifted cellist. They had six children. (Note: Josepha (1817-1840), Agnes (1819-after 1854), Ernestine (1820-after 1852), Maria (1821-after 1854), Johanna (1824-1840) and Theodor (1825-1840). A-Wsa, Konskriptionsbogen (Conscription form) Alsergrund 149/18r and 30r. Mag. Zivilgericht (Civil Court), A2, Fasz. 2-77 and 78/1840.)

== Career and later life ==
In 1812, Wawruch accepted a position as professor of medicine at the University of Prague. In 1819, he accepted another position as professor of medicine at the University of Vienna and the Medical Clinic for Surgeons. In Vienna, he became one of Ludwig van Beethoven's physicians. He was considered a good cellist and was a great admirer of the composer; Beethoven sent a score of Handel's Messiah to Wawruch as a New Year’s gift. Wawruch attended Beethoven medically until his death in 1827. In 1832, he became co-editor of the Medical Yearbooks series of the Imperial and Royal Austrian State (Medicinische Jahrbücher des k.k. österreichischen Staates). He was also a member of the Imperial and Royal Society of Physicians in Vienna (k.k. Gesellschaft der Aerzte zu Wien).

Wawruch died on 20 March 1842 in Vienna.

== Works ==
- De priscorum Graeciae ac Latii medicorum studio restaurando (On restoring the study of ancient Greek and Latin physicians), 1808.
- Tentamen inaugurale philologico-medicum sistens antiquitates typhi contagiosi (An inaugural philological-medical essay on the antiquities of contagious typhus), Brno 1812.
- Observationes clinicae Taeniam (Solium) concernentes (Clinical observations concerning tapeworm (Solium)), Beck, Wien 1833.
- Disquisitio medica cholerae cujus mentio in sacris bibliis occurrit ( Medical investigation of cholera, which is mentioned in the Holy Bible ), Beck, Wien 1833.
- Praktische Monographie der Bandwurmkrankheit durch 206 Krankheitsfälle erläutert (Practical monograph of tapeworm disease explained through 206 cases), Gerold, Wien 1844

== Bibliography ==
- Constantin von Wurzbach: "Wawruch, Andreas Johann." In: Biographisches Lexikon des Kaiserthums Oesterreich (Biographical Lexicon of the Empire of Austria). Part 53 Kaiserlich-königliche Hof- und Staatsdruckerei, Vienna 1886, p. 164 (digitalised).
- Julius Pagel (1896). "Wawruch, Andreas Ignaz" . Allgemeine Deutsche Biographie (in German). Vol. 41. Leipzig: Duncker & Humblot. p. 277.
- Wawruch, Andreas Ignaz. In: Rudolf Vierhaus (Ed.): Deutsche Biographische Enzyklopädie. 2., überarbeitete und erweiterte Auflage. Band 10: Thies–Zymalkowski. K. G. Saur, Munich 2008, ISBN 978-3-598-25040-8, p. 430 (books.google.de – restricted view).
