= Jan of Předbořice =

14th century Bohemian priest and abbot

Jan of Předbořice was a 14th-century Bohemian priest and abbot. He came from the village of Předbořice. In 1391, he was mentioned as a sacristan belonging to the monastery at Nezamyslice. As a prior, he was sent to bring tithes to Rome in 1395 and 1396.

Jan is possibly related to the minor nobleman Hroch of Předbořice, as a similar coat of arms to the one Hroch bore is monumented in the monastery at Nezamyslice.

== In popular culture ==
The vicar in the 2018 video game Kingdom Come: Deliverance is based on Jan.
