= Drahany =

- Market town
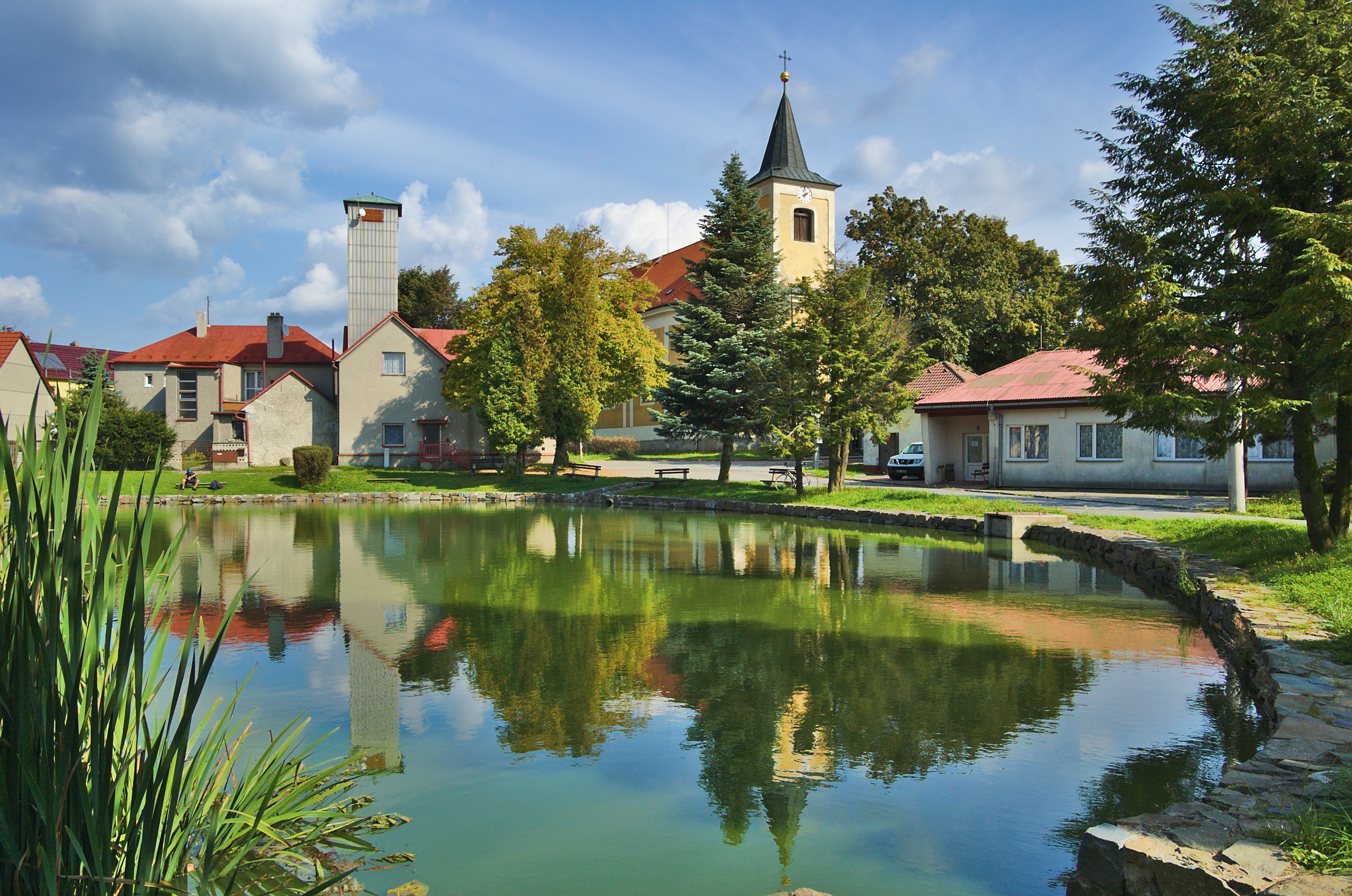
- Church of Saint John the Baptist

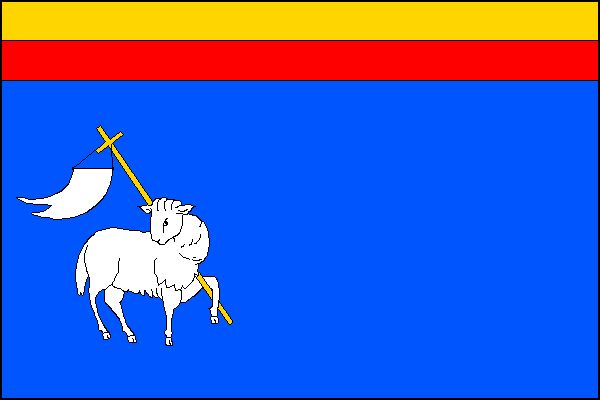
- Flag Coat of arms

- Location in the Czech Republic
- Coordinates: 49°26′0″N 16°53′51″E
- Country: Czech Republic
- Region: Olomouc
- District: Prostějov
- First mentioned: 1310

Area
  - Total: 6.76 km^{2} (2.61 sq mi)
- Elevation: 626 m (2,054 ft)

Population (2026-01-01)
  - Total: 538
  - Density: 79.6/km^{2} (206/sq mi)
- Time zone: UTC+1 (CET)
  - Summer (DST): UTC+2 (CEST)
- Postal code: 798 61
- Website: www.drahany.com

Drahany (Czech pronunciation: [ˈdraɦanɪ]) is a market town in Prostějov District in the Olomouc Region of the Czech Republic. It has about 500 inhabitants.

== Etymology ==
According to one theory, the name is derived from the personal name Drahan. According to other theory, it is derived from the Old Czech word draha (i.e. 'way', 'road') and referred to a road from Brno to Prostějov that led this way.

== Geography ==
Drahany is located about 14 kilometres (9 mi) west of Prostějov and 30 km (19 mi) southwest of Olomouc. It lies in the Drahany Highlands. The highest point is the hill Horka at 656 m (2,152 ft) above sea level. The Velká Haná Stream, which is the main source of the Haná River, originates here and flows to the south.

In the western part of the municipal territory is the fishpond Nebeský rybník. Together with its surroundings, it is protected as a nature monument with an area of 6.4 ha (16 acres).

== History ==
The first written mention of Drahany is from 1310, when the local castle, occupied by marauding knights, was conquered by King John of Bohemia. In 1322, King John sold the village to Lords of Kravaře, who annexed it to their Plumlov estate. In 1348, Drahany was first referred to as a market town. During the Hussite Wars, Drahany was badly damaged and lost its status of a market town. In 1495, the Plumlov estate with Drahany was acquired by the Pernštejn family. During their rule, Drahany developed. The prosperity ended in the times of the Thirty Years' War, during which the village was damaged and depopulated. From 1590 until the establishment of an independent municipality in 1848, Drahany was owned by the Liechtenstein family.

Drahany was again promoted to a market town in 1908. After World War II, the population decreased, as Drahany remained an agricultural municipality without significant industry.

== Demographics ==
Historical population

Year	Pop.	±%
1869	904	—
1880	947	+4.8%
1890	1,012	+6.9%
1900	1,003	−0.9%
1910	1,001	−0.2%

Year	Pop.	±%
1921	1,007	+0.6%
1930	990	−1.7%
1950	799	−19.3%
1961	755	−5.5%
1970	674	−10.7%

Year	Pop.	±%
1980	621	−7.9%
1991	564	−9.2%
2001	530	−6.0%
2011	523	−1.3%
2021	487	−6.9%

Source: Censuses

== Transport ==
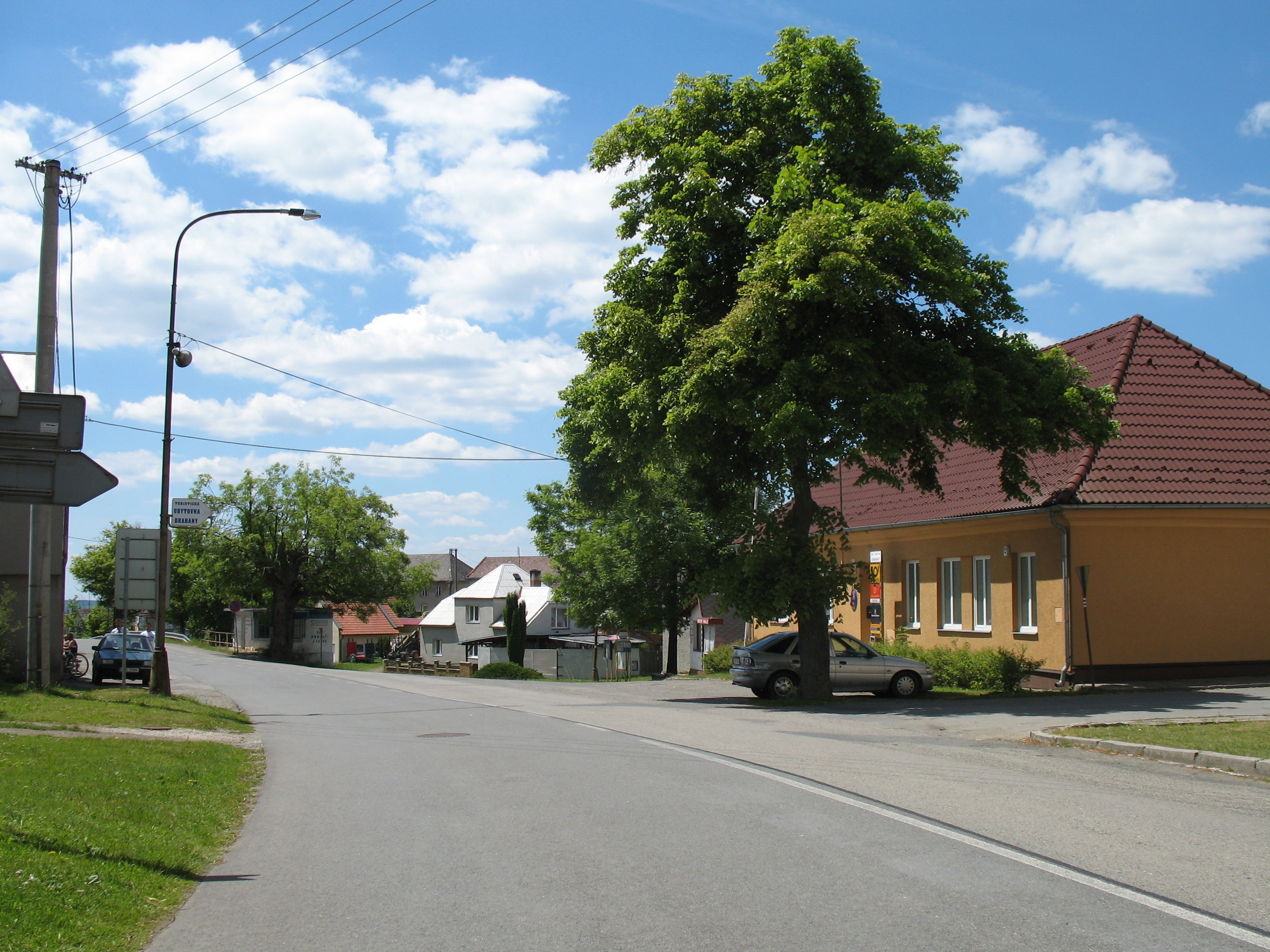
Municipal office by the main street

There are no railways or major roads passing through the municipality.

== Sights ==
The main landmark of Drahany is the Church of Saint John the Baptist. It was built in the late Baroque style in 1790.

== Notable people ==
- Wilhelm Kosch (1879–1960), Austrian historian of literature
