= Kovářov =

- Municipality
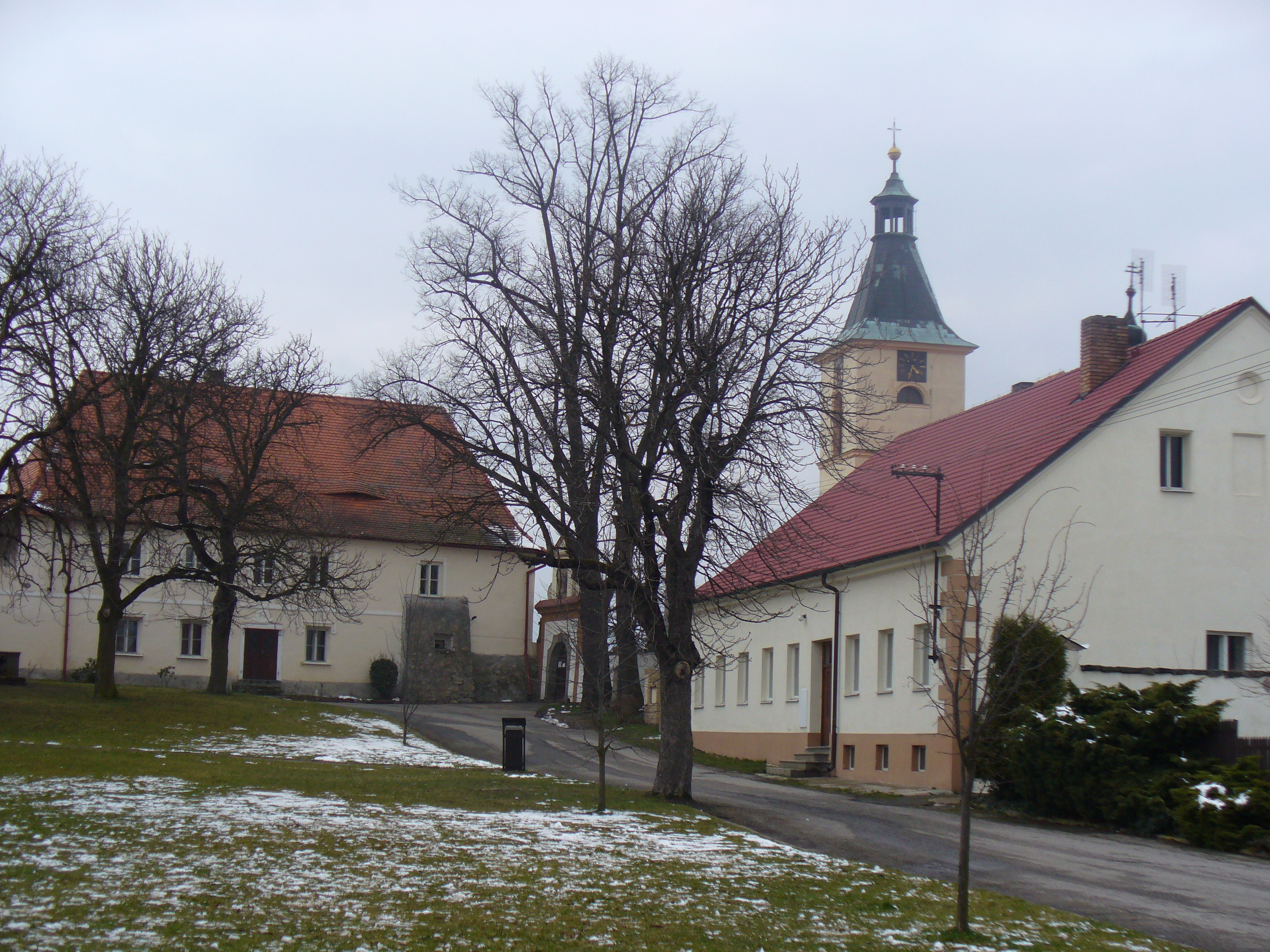
- Common in Kovářov

- Flag Coat of arms

- Location in the Czech Republic
- Coordinates: 49°31′4″N 14°16′41″E
- Country: Czech Republic
- Region: South Bohemian
- District: Písek
- First mentioned: 1220

Area
  - Total: 50.46 km^{2} (19.48 sq mi)
- Elevation: 461 m (1,512 ft)

Population (2026-01-01)
  - Total: 1,480
  - Density: 29.3/km^{2} (76.0/sq mi)
- Time zone: UTC+1 (CET)
  - Summer (DST): UTC+2 (CEST)
- Postal code: 398 55
- Website: www.kovarov.cz

Kovářov is a municipality and village in Písek District in the South Bohemian Region of the Czech Republic. It has about 1,500 inhabitants.

== Administrative division ==
Kovářov consists of 17 municipal parts (in brackets population according to the 2021 census):

- Kovářov (697)
- Březí (21)
- Chrást (48)
- Dobrá Voda (1)
- Hostín (12)
- Kotýřina (22)
- Lašovice (76)
- Onen Svět (7)
- Předbořice (135)
- Radvánov (81)
- Řenkov (26)
- Vepice (39)
- Vesec (61)
- Vladyčín (43)
- Zahořany (141)
- Záluží (9)
- Žebrákov (23)

== Etymology ==
The name Kovářov was derived either from the personal name Kovář, or from the Czech word kovář (i.e. 'smith'), meaning "Kovář's/smith's".

== Geography ==
Kovářov is located about 25 kilometres (16 mi) northeast of Písek and 56 km (35 mi) south of Prague. The eastern part of the municipal territory with the Kovářov village lies in the Vlašim Upland. The western part lies in the Benešov Uplands and borders the Orlík Reservoir. The highest point is the hill Koňský vrch at 587 metres (1,926 ft) above sea level. The territory of Kovářov is rich in small fishponds.

== History ==
The first written mention of Kovářov is from 1220. From 1592 until the establishment of an independent municipality, it was part of the Orlík estate.

== Demographics ==
Historical population

Year	Pop.	±%
1869	3,657	—
1880	3,643	−0.4%
1890	3,525	−3.2%
1900	3,429	−2.7%
1910	3,264	−4.8%

Year	Pop.	±%
1921	3,015	−7.6%
1930	2,867	−4.9%
1950	2,159	−24.7%
1961	2,040	−5.5%
1970	1,892	−7.3%

Year	Pop.	±%
1980	1,728	−8.7%
1991	1,547	−10.5%
2001	1,468	−5.1%
2011	1,430	−2.6%
2021	1,442	+0.8%

Source: Censuses

== Transport ==
There are no railways or major roads passing through the municipality.

== Sights ==
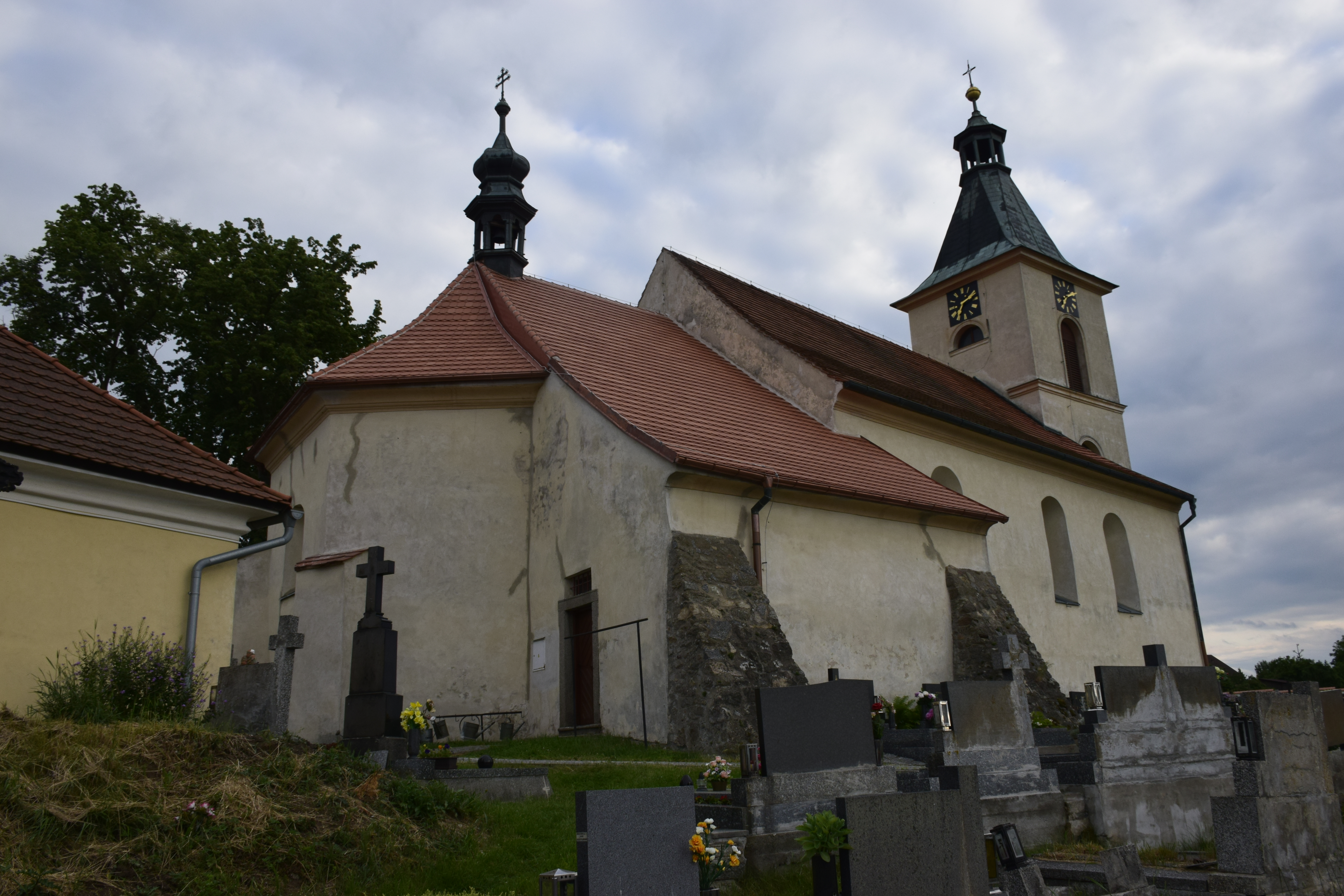
Church of All Saints

The main landmark of Kovářov is the Church of All Saints. The early Gothic church from the 13th century was expanded with Baroque towers in 1712.

== Notable people ==
- Jan of Předbořice, 14th century priest and abbot

== Twin towns – sister cities ==
Kovářov is twinned with:

- Seftigen, Switzerland
