= Nezamyslice =

- Market town
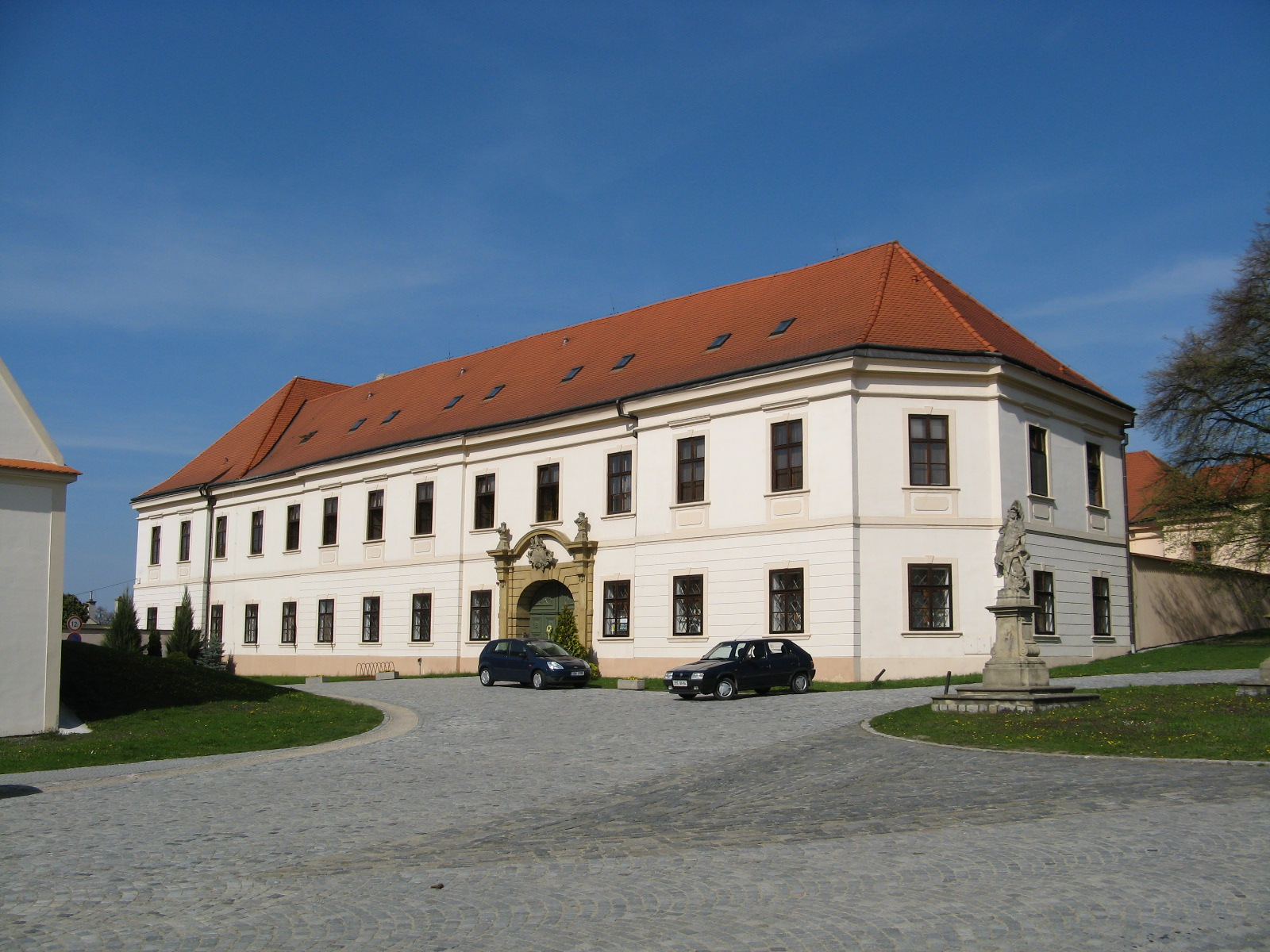
- Nezamyslice Castle

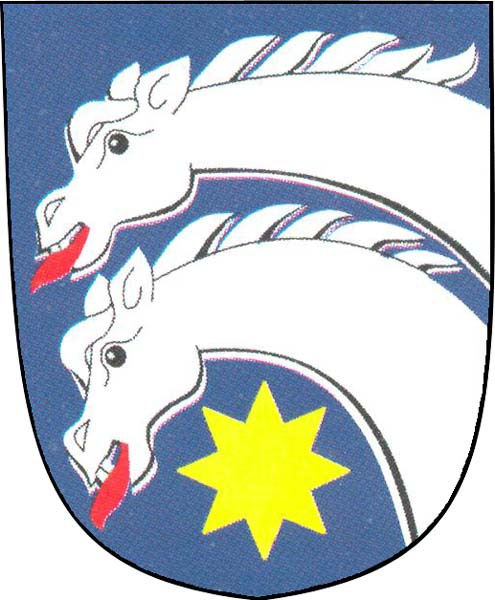
- Flag Coat of arms

- Location in the Czech Republic
- Coordinates: 49°19′32″N 17°10′24″E
- Country: Czech Republic
- Region: Olomouc
- District: Prostějov
- First mentioned: 1276

Area
  - Total: 7.35 km^{2} (2.84 sq mi)
- Elevation: 204 m (669 ft)

Population (2026-01-01)
  - Total: 1,508
  - Density: 205/km^{2} (531/sq mi)
- Time zone: UTC+1 (CET)
  - Summer (DST): UTC+2 (CEST)
- Postal code: 798 26
- Website: www.nezamyslice.cz

Nezamyslice (Czech pronunciation: [ˈnɛzamɪslɪtsɛ]) is a market town in Prostějov District in the Olomouc Region of the Czech Republic. It has about 1,500 inhabitants.

== Administrative division ==
Nezamyslice consists of two municipal parts (in brackets population according to the 2021 census):

- Nezamyslice (1,414)
- Těšice (65)

== Geography ==
Nezamyslice is located about 17 kilometres (11 mi) south of Prostějov and 29 km (18 mi) south of Olomouc. It lies in an agricultural landscape, on the border between the Litenčice Hills and Vyškov Gate. The Haná River flows through the market town.

== History ==
The first written mention of Nezamyslice is from 1276. The village of Těšice was first mentioned in 1274. Until 1383, the village was divided into three parts with different owners; among the most important owners were the Lords of Kravaře and Lords of Cimburk. In 1383, the Augustinian monastery in Lanškroun bought all the parts. The monastery owned Nezamyslice until the abolishment of the monastery in 1784. In 1813, Count Segur purchased the village. From 1819 until the establishment of an independent municipality in 1848, Nezamyslice was a property of Archduke Franz Ferdinand of Austria.

== Demographics ==
Historical population

Year	Pop.	±%
1869	980	—
1880	1,127	+15.0%
1890	1,155	+2.5%
1900	1,269	+9.9%
1910	1,416	+11.6%

Year	Pop.	±%
1921	1,469	+3.7%
1930	1,500	+2.1%
1950	1,306	−12.9%
1961	1,423	+9.0%
1970	1,396	−1.9%

Year	Pop.	±%
1980	1,401	+0.4%
1991	1,291	−7.9%
2001	1,277	−1.1%
2011	1,434	+12.3%
2021	1,479	+3.1%

Source: Censuses

== Transport ==
The D1 motorway from Brno to Ostrava runs south of the market town.

Nezamyslice is located on the railway lines Brno–Šumperk and Vyškov–Uničov.

== Sights ==
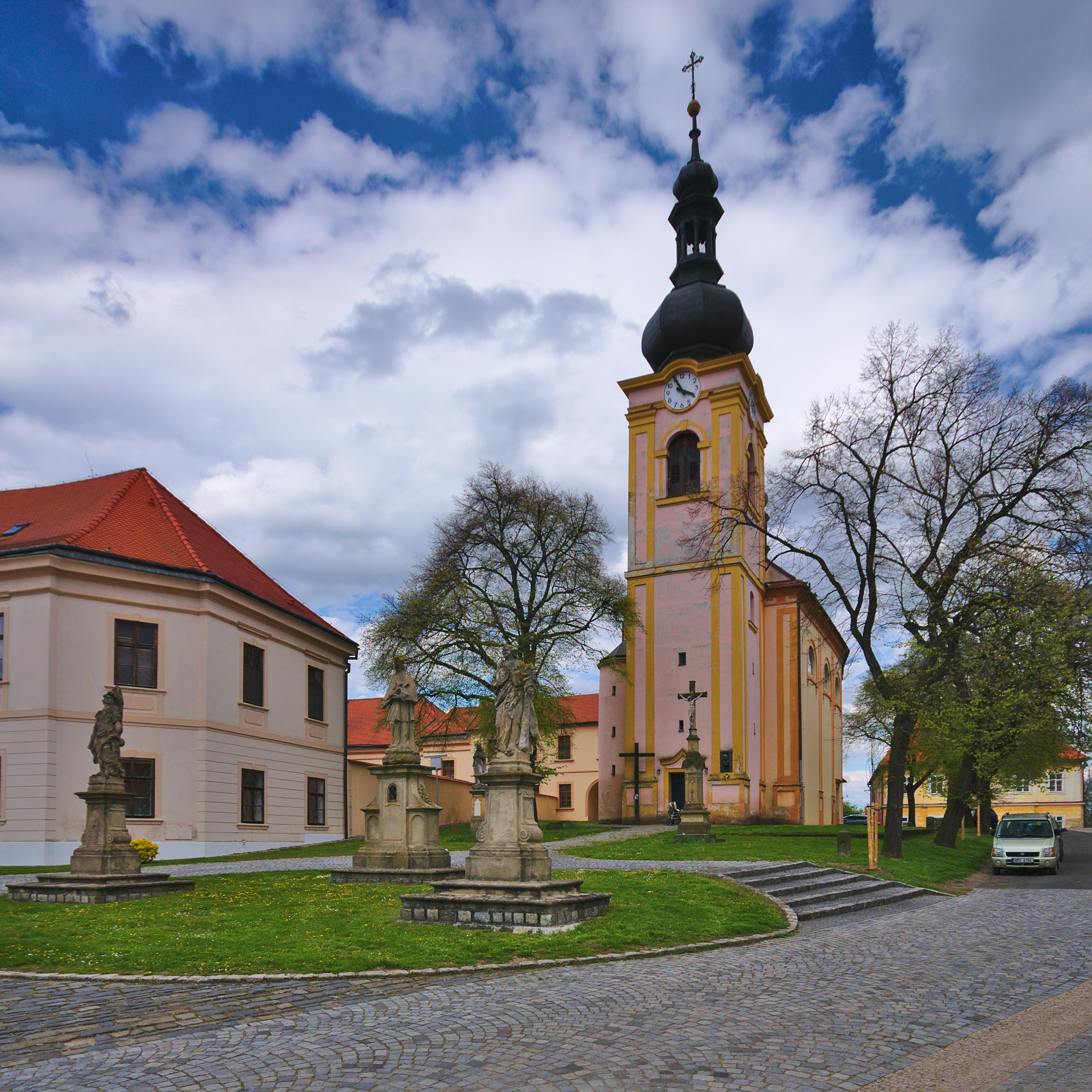
Church of Saint Wenceslaus

The main landmark of Nezamyslice is the Church of Saint Wenceslaus. It was built in the Baroque style in 1697.

Next to the church is the Nezamyslice Castle. It is a Baroque building dating from 1764. Today it houses a social welfare institute. A part of the castle complex is a Baroque granary, built in 1679.

== Notable people ==
- Jan of Předbořice, 14th century priest; abbot of the Nezamyslice Monastery
