= Haná (river) =

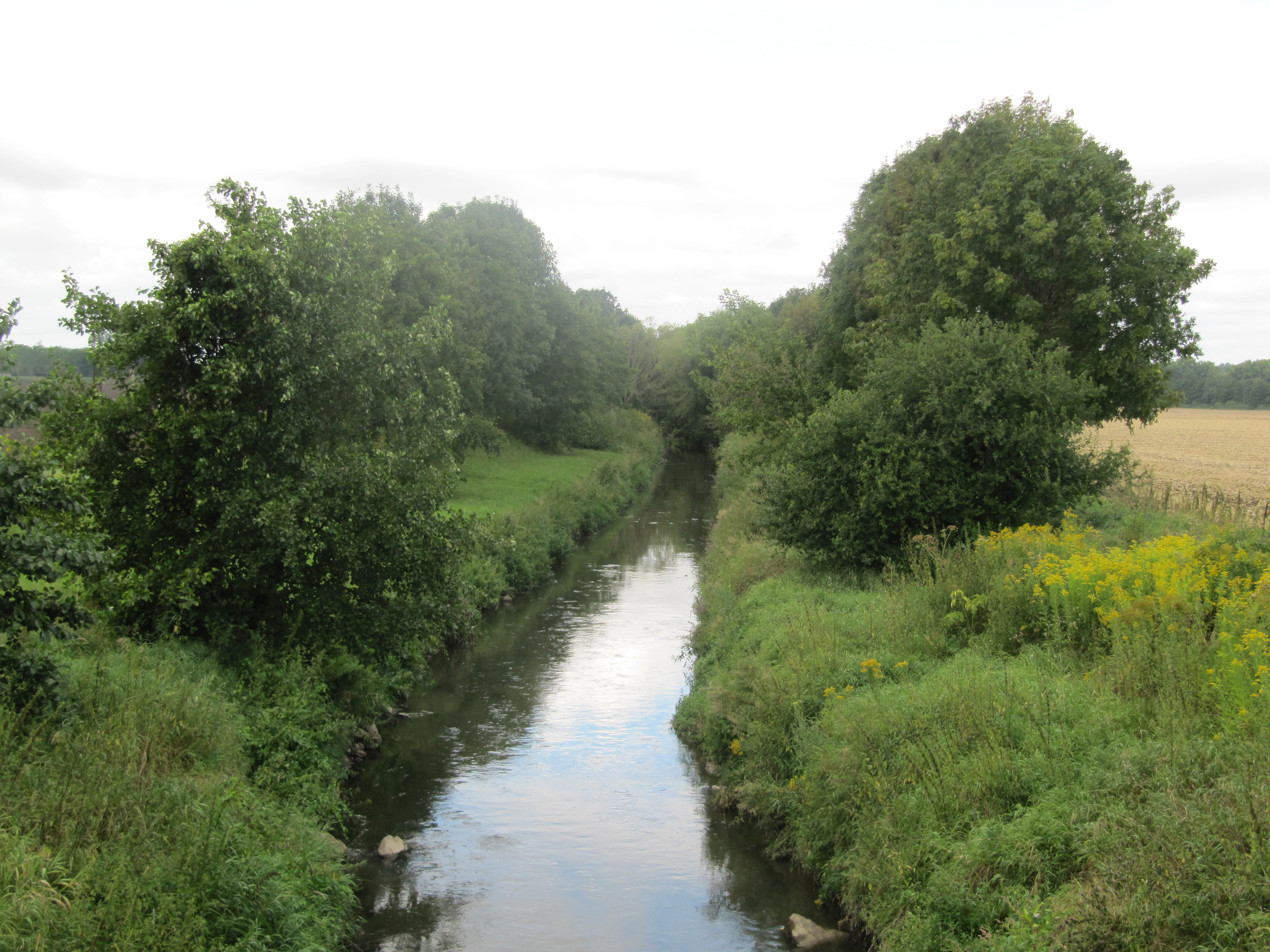
- The Haná in Měrovice nad Hanou

Location
- Country: Czech Republic
- Regions: Olomouc; South Moravian; Zlín

Physical characteristics
- Source: Velká Haná
  - location: Drahany, Drahany Highlands
  - coordinates: 49°26′7″N 16°54′9″E
  - elevation: 630 m (2,067 ft)
- Mouth
  - location: Morava
  - coordinates: 49°19′37″N 17°21′52″E
  - elevation: 190 m (623 ft)
- Length: 57.0 km (35.4 mi)
- Basin size: 607.8 km^{2} (234.7 sq mi)
- Discharge
  - average: 1.70 m^{3}/s (60 cu ft/s) near estuary

Basin features
- Progression: Morava→ Danube→ Black Sea

The Haná (Czech pronunciation: [ˈɦanaː]) is a river in the Czech Republic, a right tributary of the Morava River. It flows through the Olomouc, South Moravian and Zlín regions. It is formed by the confluence of the Velká Haná and Malá Haná streams. Together with the Velká Haná, which is its main source, the Haná is 57.0 km (35.4 mi) long. Without the Velká Haná, it is 35.3 km (21.9 mi) long.

== Etymology ==
The origin of the name is unknown. According to one theory, the name is derived from the Germanic word gana, meaning 'rich'. Other theory says that the name is connected with the pre-Slavic word ganna that denotes a stony river, a river that brings stones. The river gave the name to the ethnographic region of Haná.

== Characteristic ==
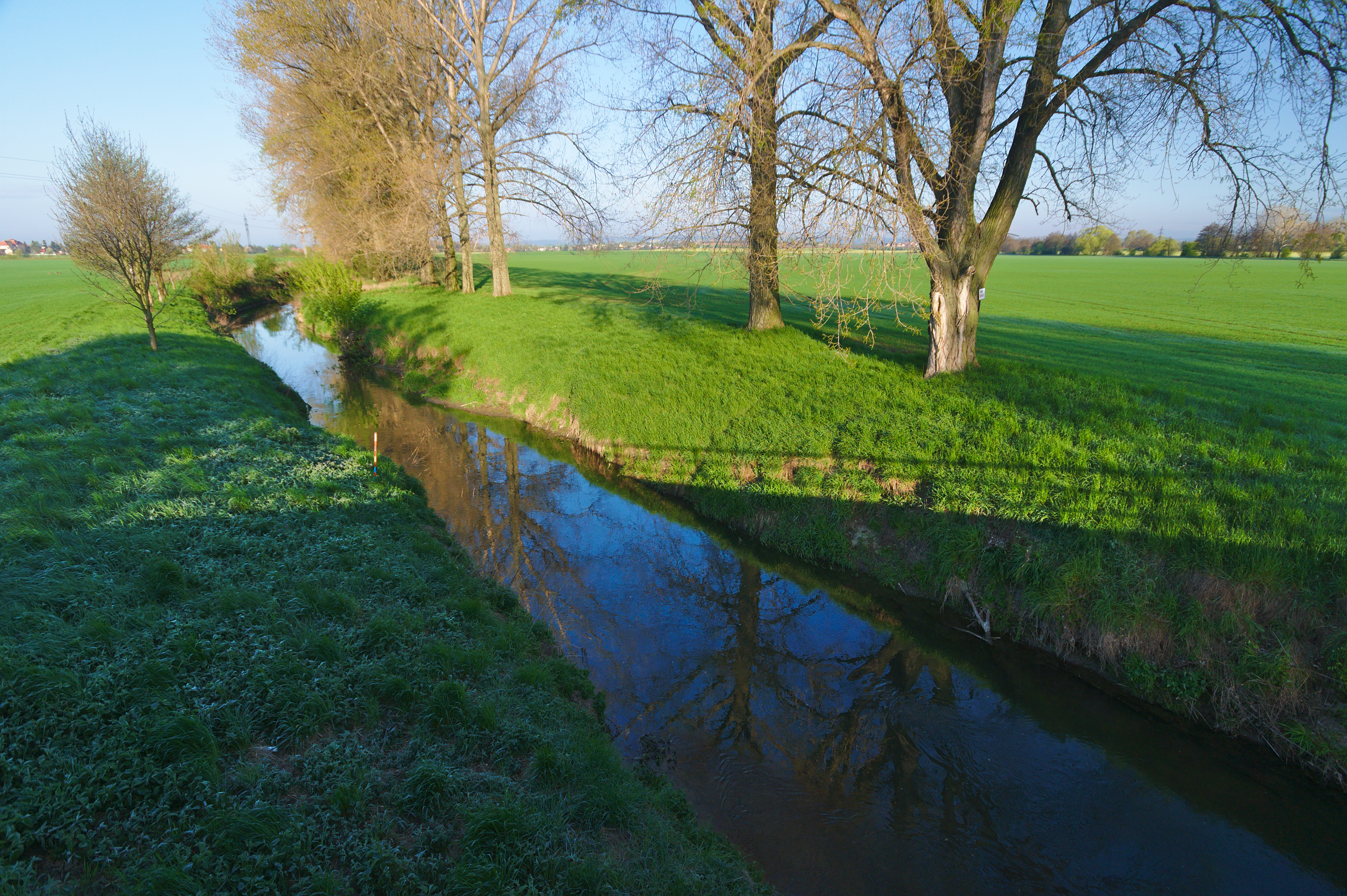
The Haná in Němčice nad Hanou

From a water management point of view, the Haná and Velká Haná are two different rivers with separate numbering of river kilometres. In a broader point of view, the Haná (as Velká Haná) originates in the territory of Drahany in the Drahany Highlands at an elevation of 630 m (2,067 ft) and flows to Kroměříž, where it enters the Morava River at an elevation of 190 m (623 ft). It is 57.0 km (35.4 mi) long. Its drainage basin has an area of 607.8 km^{2} (234.7 sq mi). The name Haná is used from the confluence of the Velká Haná with the Malá Haná in Vyškov and from this point to the confluence with the Morava, the river is 35.3 km (21.9 mi) long. The average discharge at its mouth is 1.70 m^{3}/s (60 cu ft/s).

The sources and longest tributaries of the Haná are:

Tributary	Length (km)	Side
Brodečka	33.3	left
Velká Haná	21.7	–
Malá Haná	17.7	right
Tištinka	16.0	right
Pustiměřský potok	15.0	left
Rostěnický potok	15.0	right
Švábenický potok	11.9	right

== Course ==
The river flows through the municipal territories of Vyškov, Topolany, Hoštice-Heroltice, Ivanovice na Hané, Dřevnovice, Nezamyslice, Mořice, Němčice nad Hanou, Měrovice nad Hanou, Kojetín, Bezměrov and Kroměříž.

== Bodies of water ==
There are no reservoirs and fishponds built on the Haná or Velká Haná. The largest body of water in the basin area is the Opatovice Reservoir, built on the Malá Haná.
