= Deutsches Literatur-Lexikon =

German encyclopedia

The Deutsche Literatur-Lexikon (English, German Literature Dictionary) is a biographical reference work on authors and literature, now in its third edition. The lexicon is also known as Kosch for short, after its founder Wilhelm Kosch.

== History of the book ==
The first edition was published in 1927 and 1930 in two volumes and the second, greatly expanded edition from 1947 to 1958 in four volumes:

1. Volume 1: Aachen – Hasenauer, 1949.
2. Volume 2: Hasenberger – Müllner, 1953.
3. Volume 3: Münch – Sparre, 1956.
4. Volume 4: Spartakus – Zyrl, 1958.

Since 1966, the work has been published in a third edition, first edited by Heinz Rupp (responsible for the Middle Ages) and Carl Ludwig Lang (responsible for modern times) by K. G. Saur Verlag in Munich and Francke in Berne, then by Walter de Gruyter Verlag, Berlin. The complete edition is not yet complete; the last volume to date (April 2017) is the 36th (Worch – Zasius). Supplements covering registered and anonymous authors were published in six volumes from 1994 to 1999.
