= Dřevnovice =

- Municipality
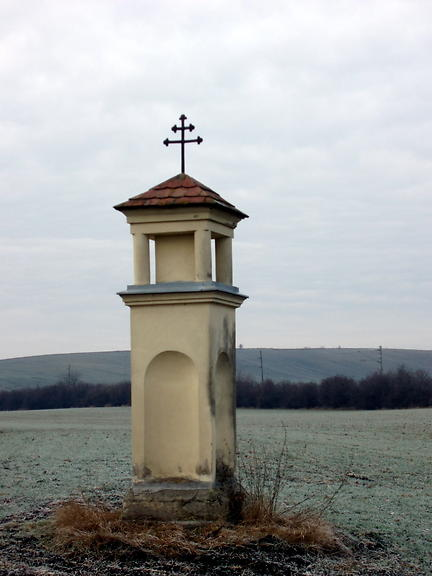
- Column shrine

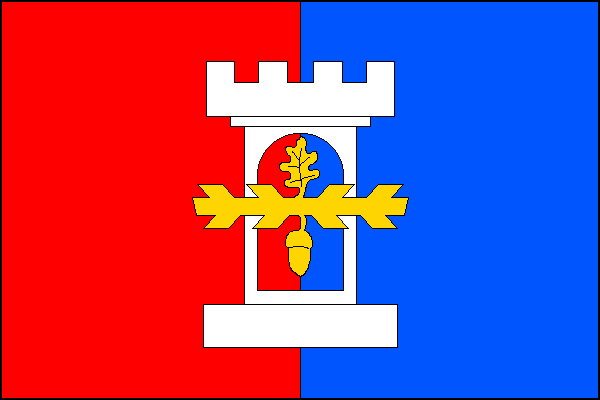
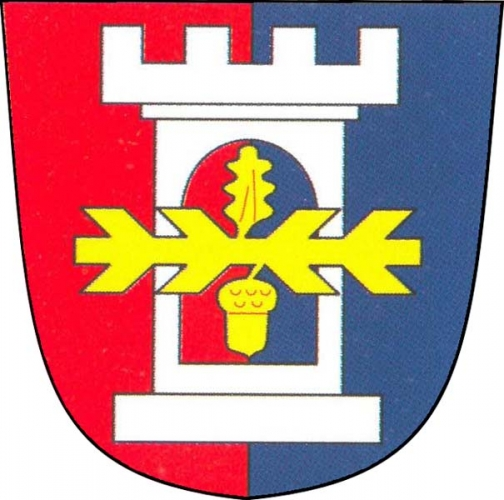
- Flag Coat of arms

- Location in the Czech Republic
- Coordinates: 49°19′41″N 17°8′36″E
- Country: Czech Republic
- Region: Olomouc
- District: Prostějov
- First mentioned: 1365

Area
  - Total: 3.80 km^{2} (1.47 sq mi)
- Elevation: 213 m (699 ft)

Population (2026-01-01)
  - Total: 458
  - Density: 121/km^{2} (312/sq mi)
- Time zone: UTC+1 (CET)
  - Summer (DST): UTC+2 (CEST)
- Postal code: 798 26
- Website: www.drevnovice.cz

Dřevnovice is a municipality and village in Prostějov District in the Olomouc Region of the Czech Republic. It has about 500 inhabitants.

Dřevnovice lies approximately 16 kilometres (10 mi) south of Prostějov, 31 km (19 mi) south of Olomouc, and 213 km (132 mi) south-east of Prague.

== Demographics ==
Historical population
Year	Pop.	±%
1869	421	—
1880	444	+5.5%
1890	451	+1.6%
1900	443	−1.8%
1910	516	+16.5%
1921	553	+7.2%
1930	660	+19.3%
1950	569	−13.8%
1961	558	−1.9%
1970	480	−14.0%
1980	439	−8.5%
1991	452	+3.0%
2001	490	+8.4%
2011	469	−4.3%
2021	454	−3.2%
Source: Censuses
