= Wilhelm Kosch =

Austrian historian and lexicographer

- Born: 2 October 1879; Drahany, Moravia
- Died: 20 December 1960 (aged 81); Vienna, Austria
- Occupation(s): Historian of literature, lexicographer

Wilhelm Franz Josef Kosch (2 October 1879 – 20 December 1960) was an Austrian historian of literature and theatre and lexicographer. The lexicon that he conceived and later revised several times, the Deutsches Literatur-Lexikon is a references in the field of German literature.

Born in Drahany in Moravia, Kosch died in Vienna in 1960 at age 81.

== Publications ==
- A. Stifter. Festschrift, 1905
- Martin Greif in seinen Werken, 1907
- Die Deutschen in Österreich und ihr Ausgleich mit den Tschechen, 1909
- Menschen und Bücher. Essays 1912
- Melchior Diepenbruck, 1913
- Das deutsche Theater und Drama (im 19. Jahrhundert) seit Schillers Tod, Vier Quellen Verlag, Leipzig (1913)
- M. Sailer, 1914
- Martin von Cochem, 1915
- Feldmarschall Graf Radetzky, 1915
- J. von Eichendorff, 1923
- Das katholische Deutschland, (A–S), 1933, (1938)
- Luise von Eichendorff in her letters to Adalbert Stifter. Der Wächter Verlag, Nymwegen 1940 and 1948.

Publisher

- Deutsches Literatur-Lexikon. Biographisches und bibliographisches Handbuch I (1949) – 4 (1958); 2nd edition 1947–1958; 3rd edition 1966
- Das katholische Deutschland (A – Schlüter), 1933–1938
- Biographisches Staatshandbuch 1–2, 1963
- Deutsches Theater-Lexikon (A – Rostok), 1953–1966; Revision by Ingrid Bigler-Marschall, 2013.

== Bibliography ==
- Heribert Sturm: Biographisches Lexikon zur Geschichte der böhmischen Länder. on behalf of the Collegium Carolinum e.V. Vol.II, Oldenbourg, Munich 1984, ISBN 3-486-52551-4, p. 257 with further references.
- Supplement to vol. I, Biographisches Lexikon zur Geschichte der böhmischen Länder, 1979, ISBN 3-48649491-0, Bibliography and data supplements: Kosch, Wilhelm.
- Franz Menges [in German] (1980). "Kosch, Wilhelm". Neue Deutsche Biographie (in German). Vol. 12. Berlin: Duncker & Humblot. pp. 606–608. (full text online).
- Jaksch: Bohemia 4. Oktober 1929.
