= Bezměrov =

- Municipality
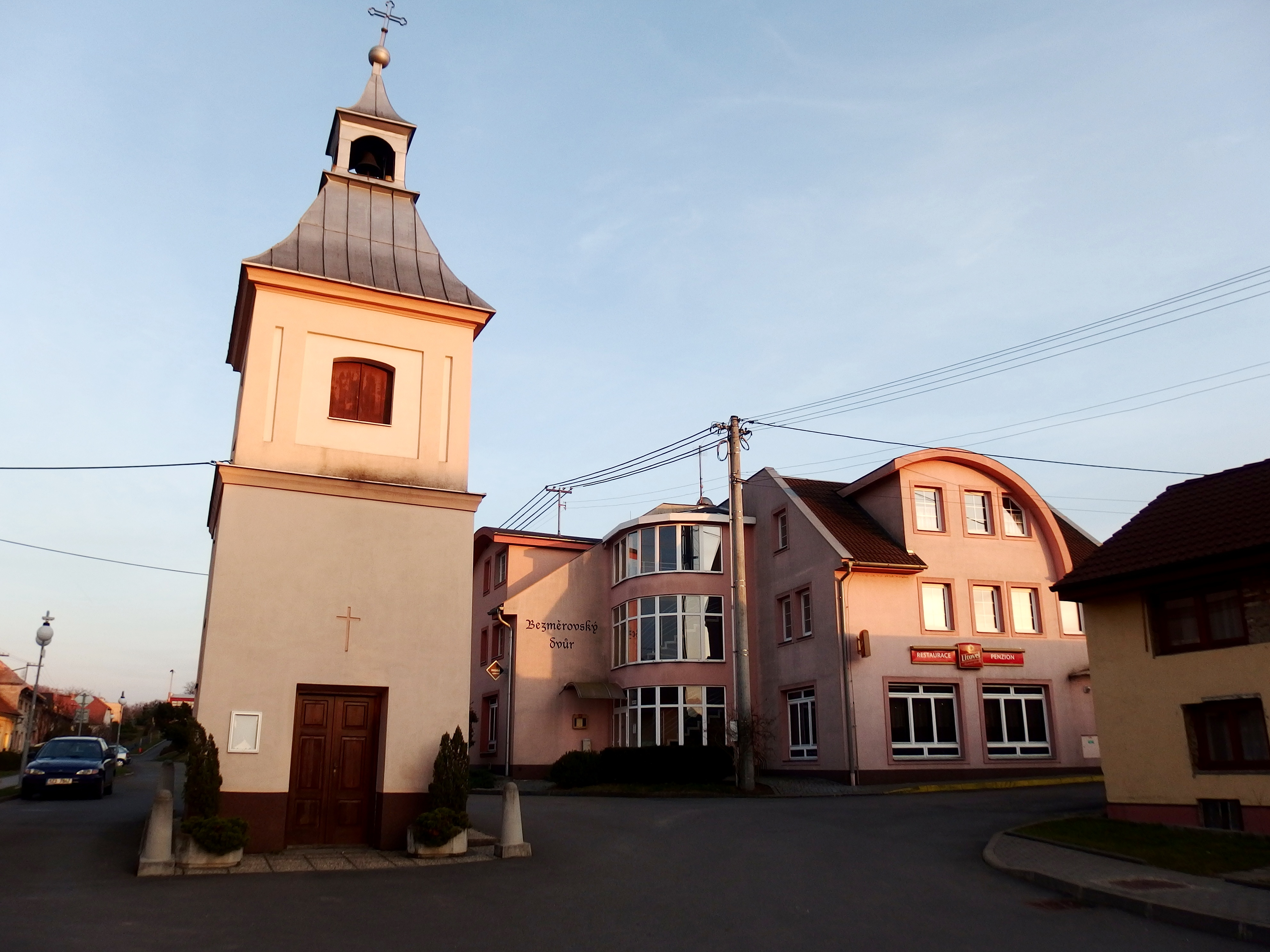
- Belfry and a restaurant

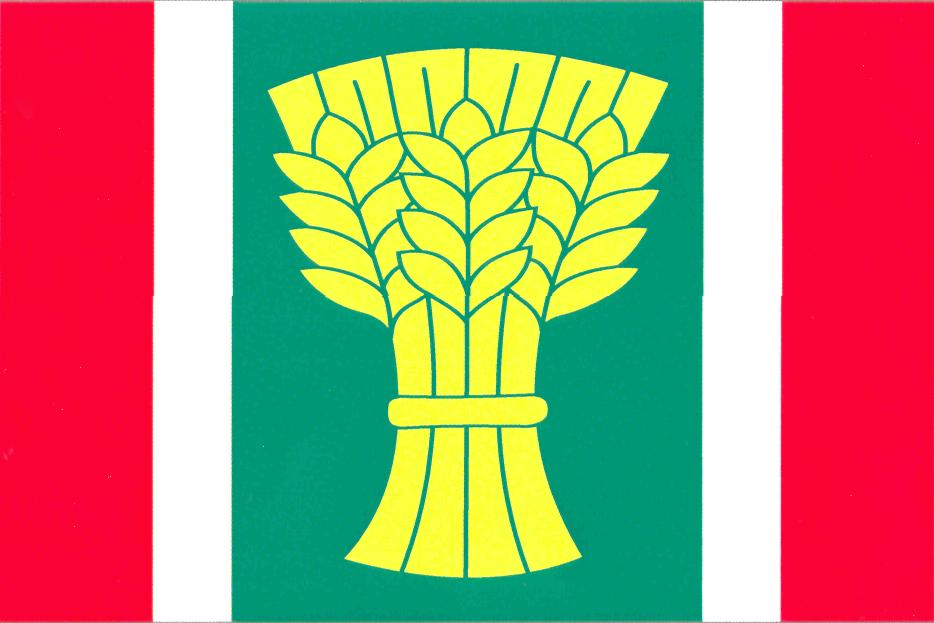
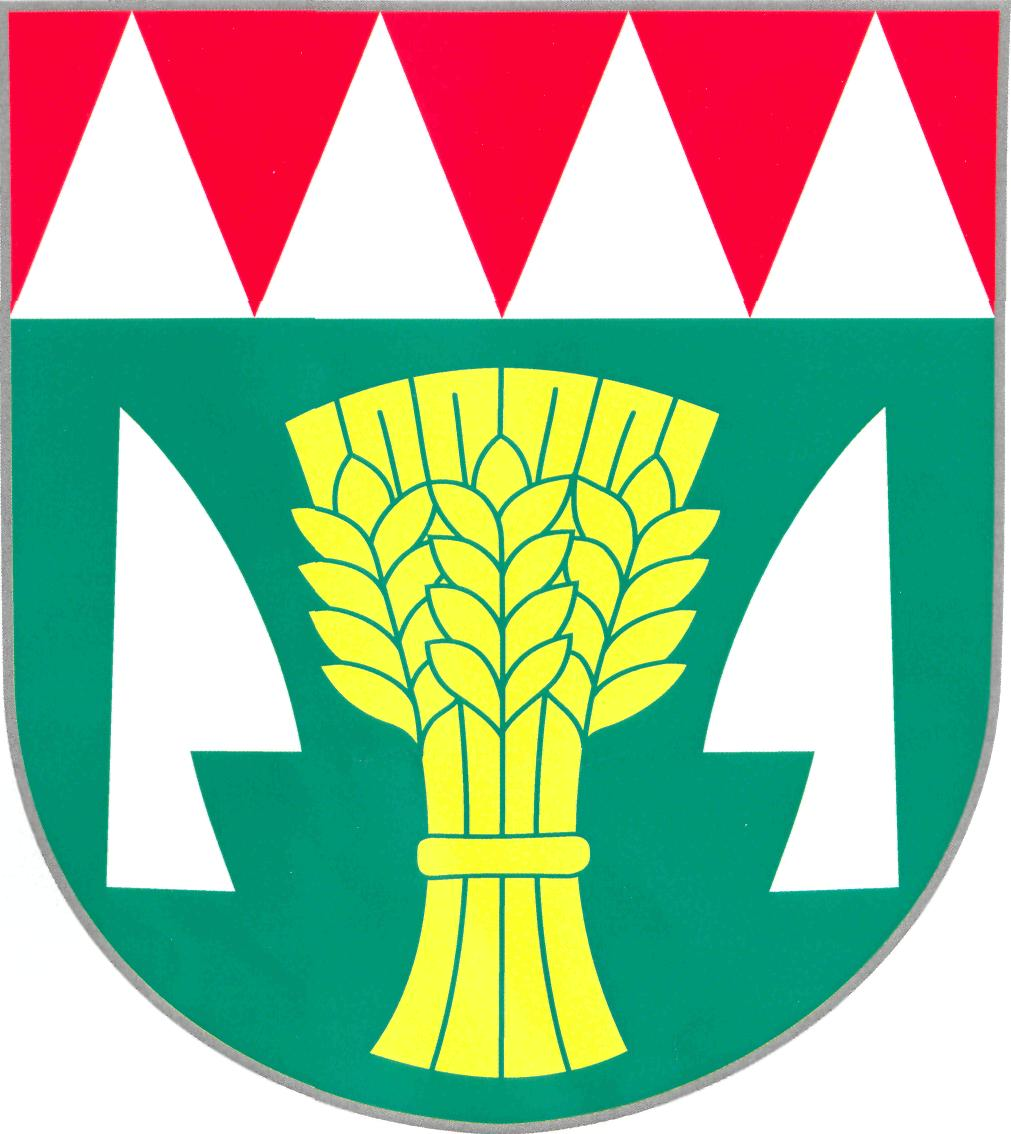
- Flag Coat of arms

- Location in the Czech Republic
- Coordinates: 49°19′47″N 17°20′5″E
- Country: Czech Republic
- Region: Zlín
- District: Kroměříž
- First mentioned: 1078

Area
  - Total: 7.25 km^{2} (2.80 sq mi)
- Elevation: 197 m (646 ft)

Population (2026-01-01)
  - Total: 544
  - Density: 75.0/km^{2} (194/sq mi)
- Time zone: UTC+1 (CET)
  - Summer (DST): UTC+2 (CEST)
- Postal code: 767 01
- Website: www.bezmerov.cz

Bezměrov is a municipality and village in Kroměříž District in the Zlín Region of the Czech Republic. It has about 500 inhabitants.

Bezměrov lies approximately 6 kilometres (4 mi) north-west of Kroměříž, 27 km (17 mi) north-west of Zlín, and 227 km (141 mi) east of Prague.

== History ==
The first written mention of Bezměrov is from 1078.

== Demographics ==
Historical population
Year	Pop.	±%
1869	563	—
1880	665	+18.1%
1890	675	+1.5%
1900	695	+3.0%
1910	754	+8.5%
1921	756	+0.3%
1930	737	−2.5%
1950	609	−17.4%
1961	689	+13.1%
1970	619	−10.2%
1980	573	−7.4%
1991	542	−5.4%
2001	556	+2.6%
2011	518	−6.8%
2021	484	−6.6%
Source: Censuses
