= Měrovice nad Hanou =

- Municipality
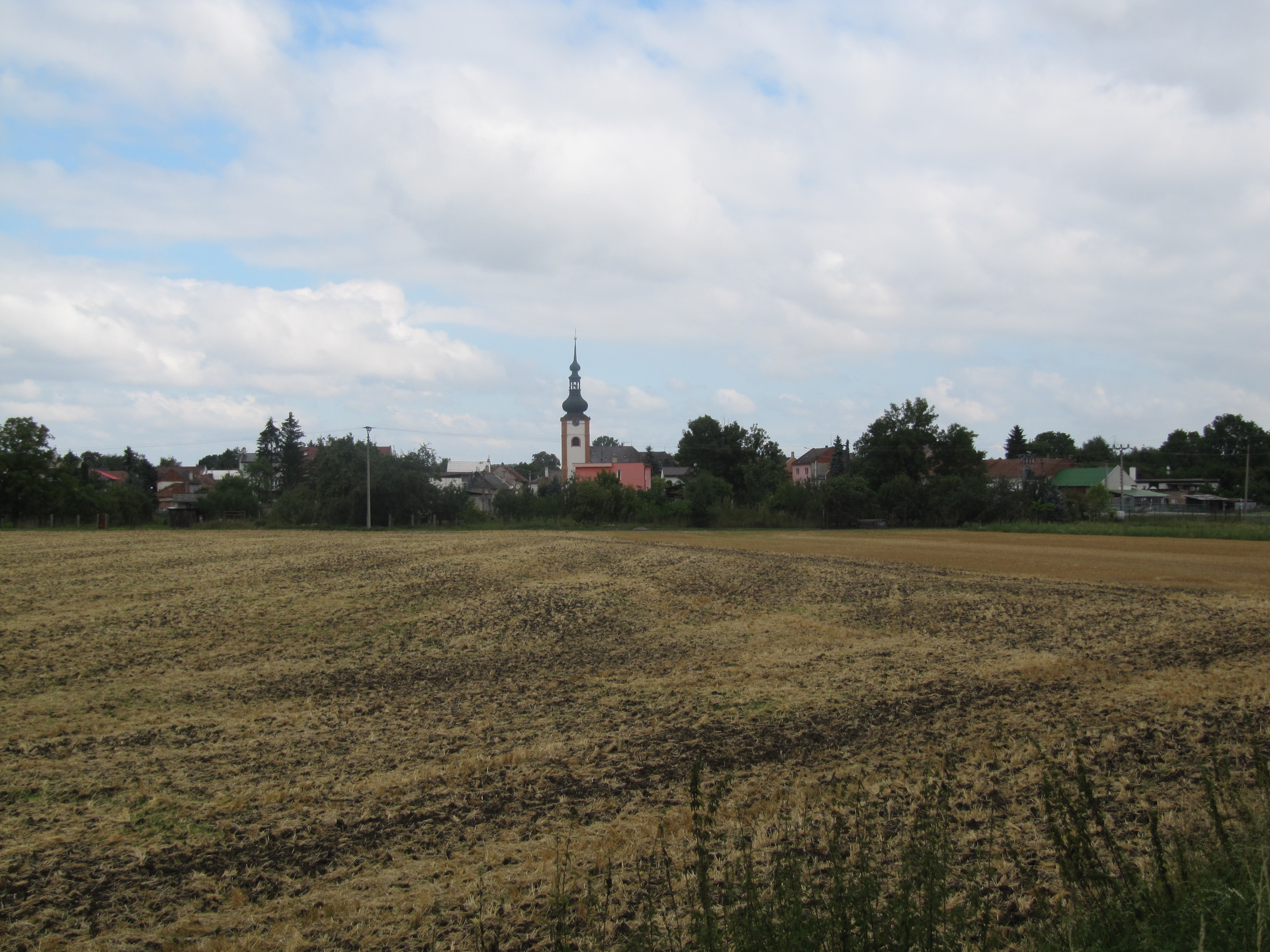
- View from the southwest

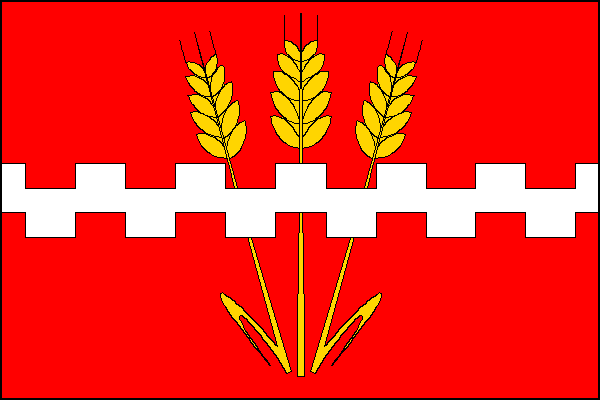
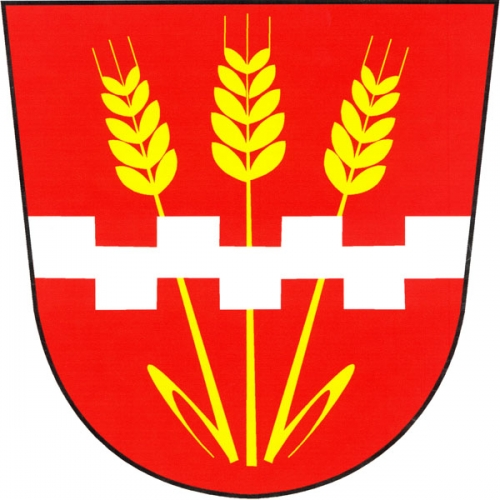
- Flag Coat of arms

- Location in the Czech Republic
- Coordinates: 49°20′30″N 17°14′45″E
- Country: Czech Republic
- Region: Olomouc
- District: Přerov
- First mentioned: 1406

Area
  - Total: 7.92 km^{2} (3.06 sq mi)
- Elevation: 202 m (663 ft)

Population (2026-01-01)
  - Total: 695
  - Density: 87.8/km^{2} (227/sq mi)
- Time zone: UTC+1 (CET)
  - Summer (DST): UTC+2 (CEST)
- Postal code: 752 01
- Website: www.merovicenh.cz

Měrovice nad Hanou is a municipality and village in Přerov District in the Olomouc Region of the Czech Republic. It has about 700 inhabitants.

Měrovice nad Hanou lies approximately 20 kilometres (12 mi) south-west of Přerov, 28 km (17 mi) south of Olomouc, and 220 km (140 mi) east of Prague.

== Demographics ==
Historical population
Year	Pop.	±%
1869	559	—
1880	645	+15.4%
1890	648	+0.5%
1900	633	−2.3%
1910	720	+13.7%
1921	767	+6.5%
1930	757	−1.3%
1950	709	−6.3%
1961	744	+4.9%
1970	729	−2.0%
1980	648	−11.1%
1991	661	+2.0%
2001	694	+5.0%
2011	659	−5.0%
2021	657	−0.3%
Source: Censuses
