= Radslavice (Vyškov District) =

- Municipality
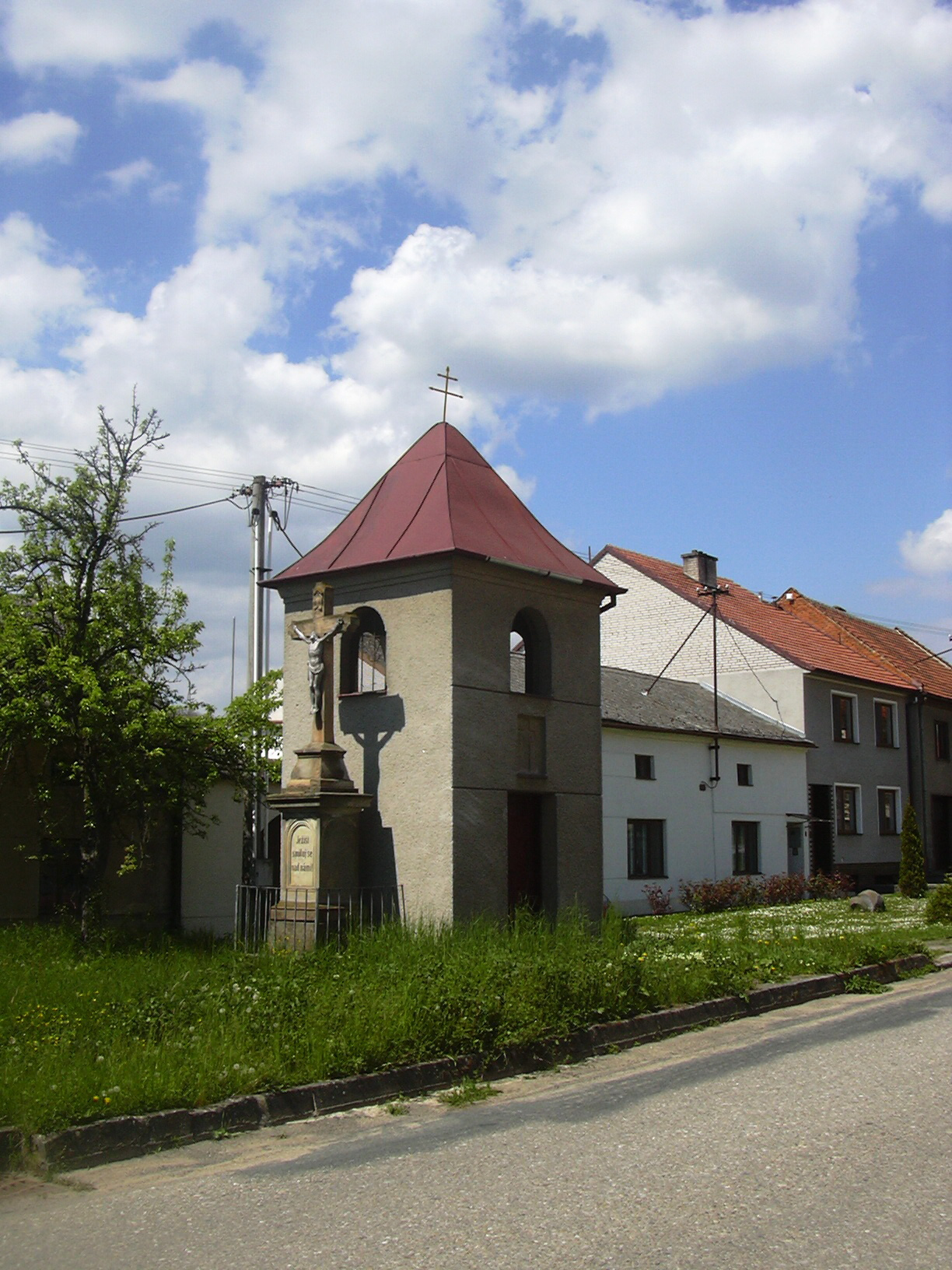
- Belfry

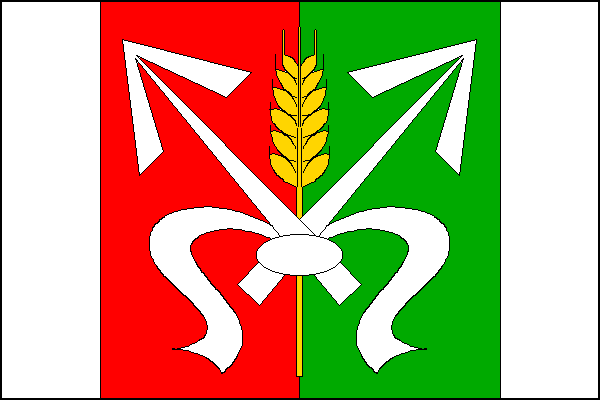
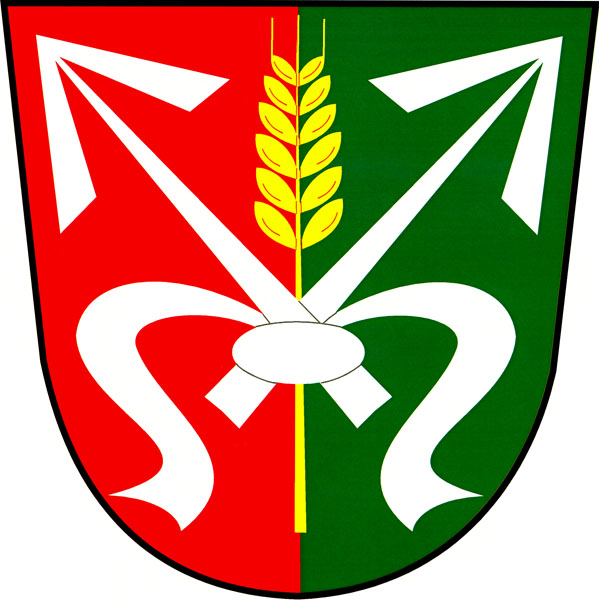
- Flag Coat of arms

- Location in the Czech Republic
- Coordinates: 49°19′23″N 17°0′14″E
- Country: Czech Republic
- Region: South Moravian
- District: Vyškov
- First mentioned: 1381

Area
  - Total: 4.35 km^{2} (1.68 sq mi)
- Elevation: 330 m (1,080 ft)

Population (2026-01-01)
  - Total: 458
  - Density: 105/km^{2} (273/sq mi)
- Time zone: UTC+1 (CET)
  - Summer (DST): UTC+2 (CEST)
- Postal code: 683 21
- Website: www.obecradslavice.com

Radslavice is a municipality and village in Vyškov District in the South Moravian Region of the Czech Republic. It has about 500 inhabitants.

Radslavice lies approximately 6 kilometres (4 mi) north of Vyškov, 31 km (19 mi) north-east of Brno, and 205 km (127 mi) south-east of Prague.

== Administrative division ==
Radslavice consists of two municipal parts (in brackets population according to the 2021 census):

- Radslavice (311)
- Radslavičky (94)

== Demographics ==
Historical population
Year	Pop.	±%
1869	682	—
1880	724	+6.2%
1890	786	+8.6%
1900	838	+6.6%
1910	878	+4.8%
1921	872	−0.7%
1930	829	−4.9%
1950	544	−34.4%
1961	566	+4.0%
1970	494	−12.7%
1980	408	−17.4%
1991	377	−7.6%
2001	378	+0.3%
2011	398	+5.3%
2021	405	+1.8%
Source: Censuses
