= Olomouc agglomeration =

Area of the Czech Republic

Olomouc agglomeration Olomoucká aglomerace
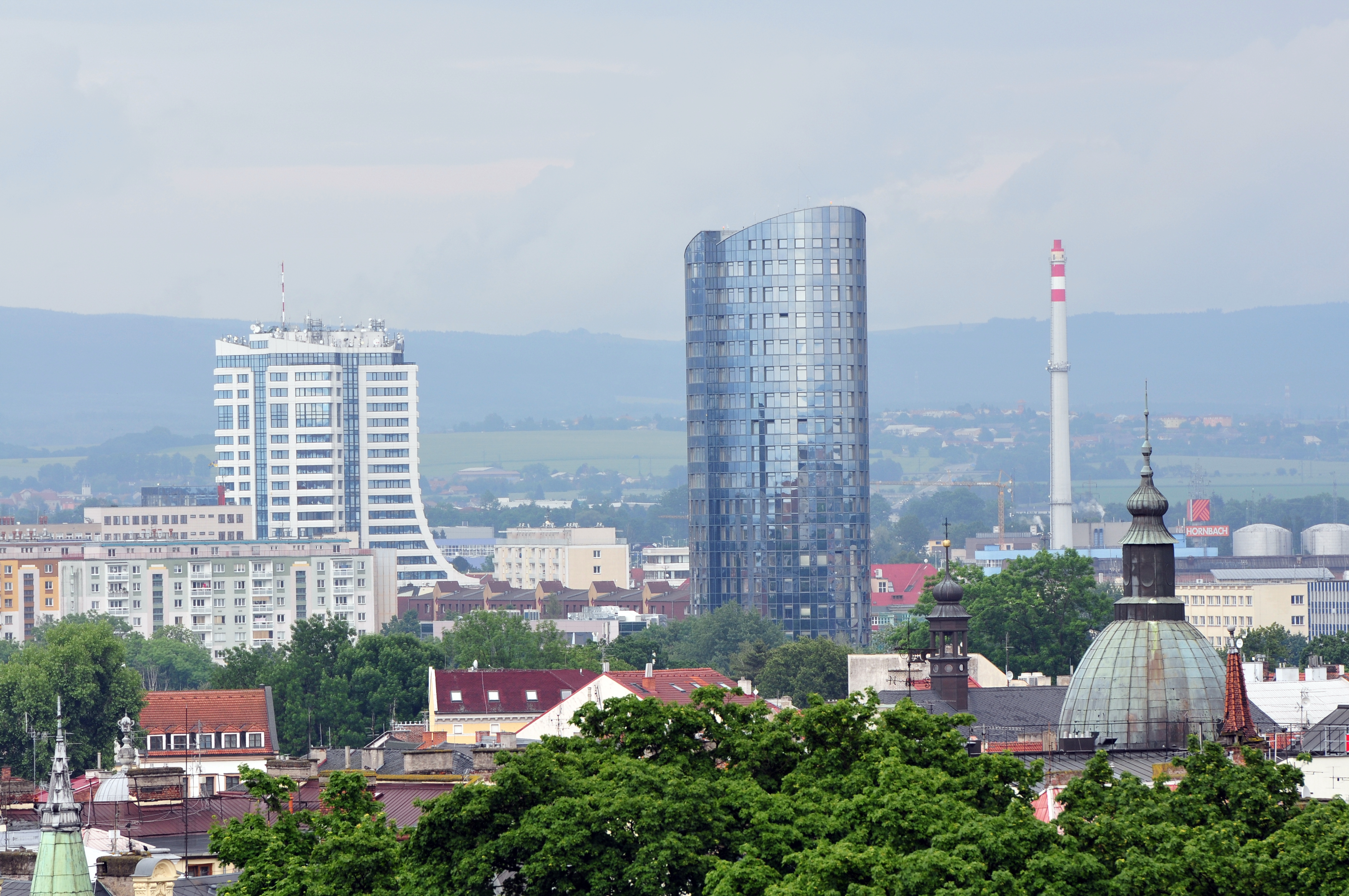
- Skyline of Olomouc
- Country: Czech Republic
- Region: Olomouc
- Largest city: Olomouc

Area
  - Total: 1,730.7 km^{2} (668.2 sq mi)

Population (2024)
  - Total: 400,933
  - Density: 231.66/km^{2} (600.00/sq mi)
- Time zone: UTC+1 (CET)
  - Summer (DST): UTC+2 (CEST)

The Olomouc agglomeration (Czech: Olomoucká aglomerace) is the agglomeration of the city of Olomouc and its surroundings in the Czech Republic. It was defined in 2020 as a tool for drawing money from the European Structural and Investment Funds and is valid in 2021–2027. It thus replaced the delimitation from 2014. The agglomeration has a population of about 401,000 and also includes the cities of Přerov and Prostějov.

== Definition ==
The Olomouc agglomeration was first defined in 2014 by the Ministry of Regional Development of the Czech Republic for the purposes of the Integrated Land Development Plans, which was a tool for drawing money from the European Structural and Investment Funds. The agglomeration comprised 240 municipalities with about 452,000 inhabitants and had an area of 2,322 km^{2} (897 sq mi).

The current Olomouc agglomeration was defined in 2020 by the Ministry of Regional Development for the purposes of the so-called Integrated Territorial Investment (ITI), which is a newer tool for drawing money from the European Structural and Investment Funds.

The territory was defined on the basis of a coefficient composed of three methods: integrated system of centres (i.e. delineation of commuting flows based on mobile operator data from 2019), time spent in core cities (based on mobile operator data from 2019) and residential suburbanization zones (based on statistics of realized housing construction and directional migration from the core of the agglomeration to suburban municipalities in the period 2009–2016). The scope of the territory is valid for the period 2021–2027.

== Municipalities ==
The agglomeration includes 174 municipalities. The original approved Integrated Territorial Investment listed 169 municipalities, bu five more municipalities were added by the amendment from June 2020.

Name	Population (2024)
Alojzov	254
Babice	450
Bedihošť	1,123
Bělkovice-Lašťany	2,270
Beňov	672
Bílovice-Lutotín	507
Bílsko	232
Biskupice	310
Blatec	658
Bochoř	968
Bohuňovice	2,531
Bohuslávky	321
Brodek u Přerova	1,873
Buk	380
Bukovany	707
Bystročice	895
Bystrovany	1,002
Čechy	332
Čechy pod Kosířem	1,081
Čehovice	534
Čelčice	509
Čelechovice	132
Čelechovice na Hané	1,316
Červenka	1,447
Charváty	945
Cholina	712
Císařov	320
Citov	539
Daskabát	620
Dětkovice	541
Dobrčice	232
Dobrochov	362
Dolany	2,942
Dolní Újezd	1,225
Doloplazy	1,340
Domašov u Šternberka	345
Domaželice	529
Drahanovice	1,845
Dřevohostice	1,475
Držovice	1,639
Dub nad Moravou	1,629
Dubčany	284
Grygov	1,519
Grymov	162
Haňovice	476
Hlásnice	248
Hlinsko	229
Hlubočky	4,202
Hluchov	340
Hlušovice	1,095
Hněvotín	1,920
Hnojice	651
Horka nad Moravou	2,685
Horní Moštěnice	1,688
Hradčany	328
Hranice	18,024
Hrdibořice	212
Hrubčice	856
Jívová	647
Klenovice na Hané	845
Klopotovice	283
Kokory	1,090
Komárov	226
Konice	2,664
Kostelec na Hané	2,860
Kožušany-Tážaly	880
Kralice na Hané	1,690
Krčmaň	501
Křelov-Břuchotín	1,954
Laškov	565
Lazníčky	185
Lazníky	546
Lešany	384
Lhotka	71
Liboš	619
Lipina	175
Lipník nad Bečvou	7,961
Lipová	270
Líšná	252
Litovel	9,689
Loučany	621
Luběnice	500
Lutín	3,234
Lužice	407
Majetín	1,184
Malé Hradisko	387
Mladějovice	729
Mostkovice	1,617
Mrsklesy	699
Myslejovice	659
Nahošovice	154
Náklo	1,507
Náměšť na Hané	2,202
Nelešovice	183
Obědkovice	271
Ohrozim	464
Oldřichov	122
Olomouc	102,293
Olšany u Prostějova	1,847
Osek nad Bečvou	1,366
Otaslavice	1,313
Pavlovice u Přerova	721
Pivín	753
Plumlov	2,274
Pňovice	1,011
Podolí	199
Přáslavice	1,489
Přerov	41,661
Přestavlky	254
Příkazy	1,337
Prosenice	802
Prostějov	43,563
Ptení	1,093
Radkova Lhota	209
Radkovy	148
Radslavice	1,150
Radvanice	278
Říkovice	457
Rokytnice	1,509
Samotišky	1,359
Seloutky	529
Senice na Hané	1,776
Senička	362
Šišma	218
Skalka	272
Skrbeň	1,134
Slatinice	1,586
Slatinky	591
Smržice	1,634
Sobíšky	147
Stará Ves	610
Stařechovice	547
Štarnov	866
Štěpánov	3,531
Šternberk	13,264
Stínava	163
Stražisko	442
Střeň	603
Strukov	162
Suchonice	177
Sušice	313
Svésedlice	303
Těšetice	1,346
Tovačov	2,502
Tovéř	657
Troubky	2,043
Tršice	1,871
Tučín	446
Turovice	244
Týn nad Bečvou	841
Újezd	1,510
Uničov	11,151
Určice	1,399
Ústín	436
Velká Bystřice	3,694
Velký Týnec	3,192
Velký Újezd	1,389
Věrovany	1,409
Veselíčko	916
Věžky	201
Vícov	559
Vilémov	428
Vincencov	115
Vlkoš	678
Vranovice-Kelčice	611
Vrbátky	1,758
Vřesovice	582
Výkleky	281
Výšovice	589
Zábeštní Lhota	178
Zdětín	386
Želatovice	543
Želechovice	251
Žerotín	451
Total	400,933
