= Vranovice =

Vranovice may refer to places in the Czech Republic:

- Vranovice (Brno-Country District), a municipality and village in the South Moravian Region
- Vranovice (Příbram District), a municipality and village in the Central Bohemian Region
- Vranovice-Kelčice, a municipality and village in the Olomouc Region
- Vranovice, a village and part of Břasy in the Plzeň Region
