= Majetín =

- Municipality
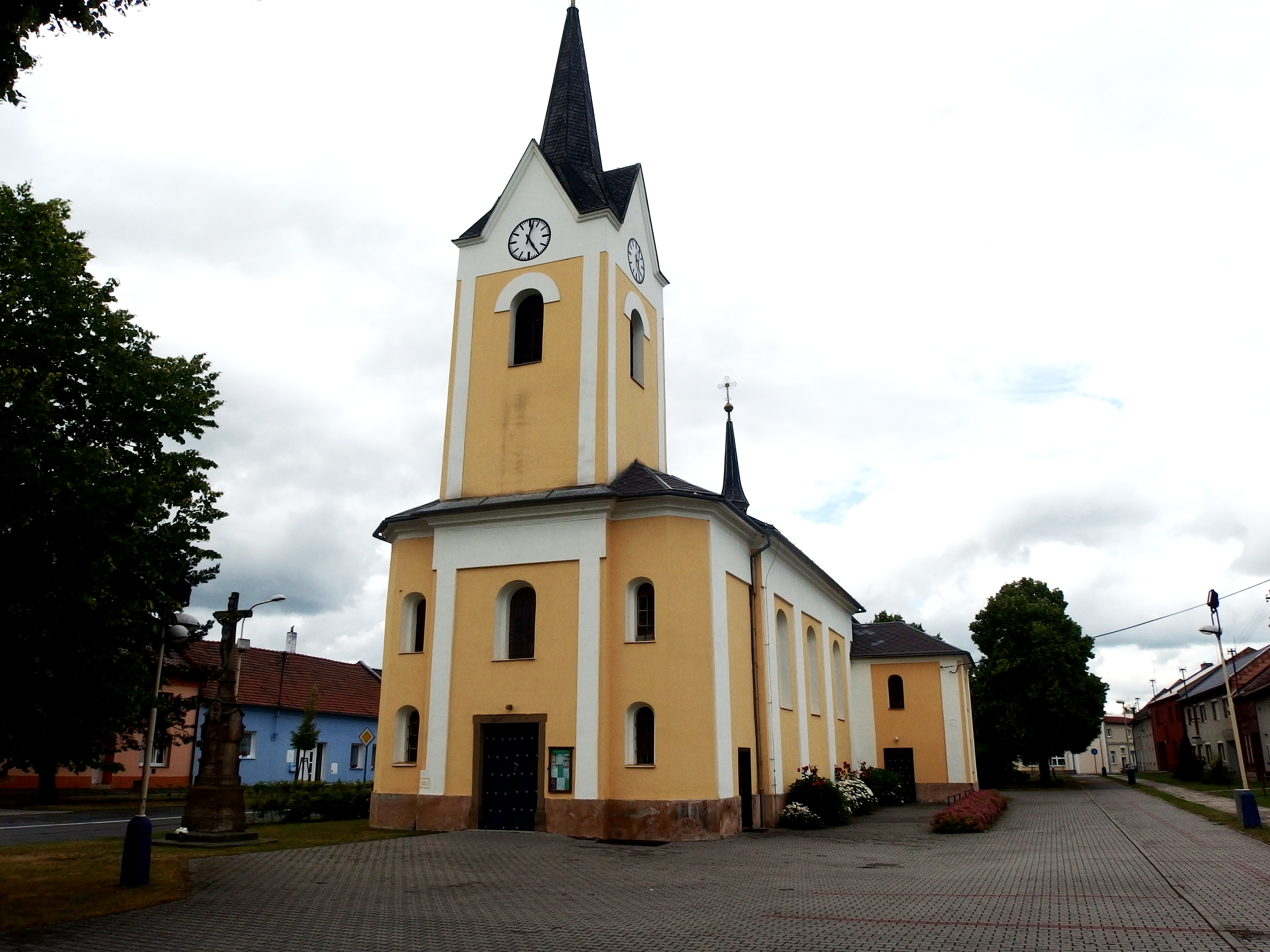
- Church of Saints Cyril and Methodius

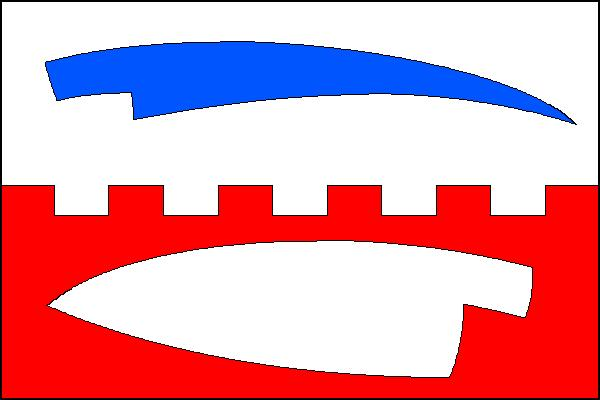
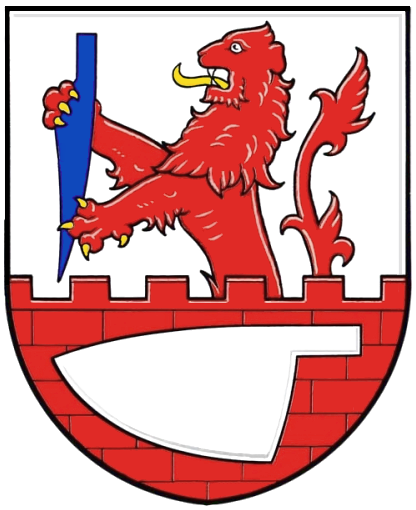
- Flag Coat of arms

- Location in the Czech Republic
- Coordinates: 49°29′53″N 17°19′59″E
- Country: Czech Republic
- Region: Olomouc
- District: Olomouc
- First mentioned: 1277

Area
  - Total: 9.50 km^{2} (3.67 sq mi)
- Elevation: 206 m (676 ft)

Population (2026-01-01)
  - Total: 1,212
  - Density: 128/km^{2} (330/sq mi)
- Time zone: UTC+1 (CET)
  - Summer (DST): UTC+2 (CEST)
- Postal code: 751 03
- Website: www.majetin.cz

Majetín (German: Majetein) is a municipality and village in Olomouc District in the Olomouc Region of the Czech Republic. It has about 1,200 inhabitants.

== Geography ==
Majetín is located about 11 kilometres (7 mi) south of Olomouc. It lies in a flat agricultural landscape in the Upper Morava Valley. The Olešnice River flows along the southern municipal border. In the centre of Majetín is located the fishpond Hliník.

== History ==
In the 13th century, a water castle existed at the site. The first written mention of Majetín is in a deed from 1277, when one Heřman of Majetín acted as mediator in a border dispute between the monasteries of Hradisko and Velehrad. Majetín was made up of a water castle and hamlet of Starý Majetín.

In 1306, King Wenceslaus III vested Lord Unka of Majetín with extended woodland estates which also were claimed by the Olomouc citizens who founded the village of Grygov. A lengthy conflict arose which was finally decided in 1352 by Moravian Margrave John Henry in favour of Olomouc. The Lords of Majetín remained in dispute with their neighbours; during the Hussite Wars they supported the insurgents, whereafter Emperor Sigismund had their castle demolished.

When the line became extinct in 1440, the estates changed hands several times. In 1521, Majetín was purchased by the Moravian governor Jan IV of Pernštejn and incorporated into the Tovačov estate. It belonged to the Tovačov estate until World War I.

== Demographics ==
Historical population

Year	Pop.	±%
1869	938	—
1880	1,035	+10.3%
1890	1,099	+6.2%
1900	1,210	+10.1%
1910	1,254	+3.6%

Year	Pop.	±%
1921	1,178	−6.1%
1930	1,301	+10.4%
1950	1,197	−8.0%
1961	1,134	−5.3%
1970	1,064	−6.2%

Year	Pop.	±%
1980	1,033	−2.9%
1991	962	−6.9%
2001	1,042	+8.3%
2011	1,100	+5.6%
2021	1,148	+4.4%

Source: Censuses

== Transport ==
The railway line from Olomouc to Přerov runs through the municipality, but there is no train station. The nearest train station is at neighbouring Brodek u Přerova.

== Sights ==
The most notable building is the Church of Saints Cyril and Methodius from 1863. The rectory was built in 1872. The Chapel of Our Lady of Lourdes was established in 1885 above a spring of water which is considered curative.
