= Výkleky =

- Municipality
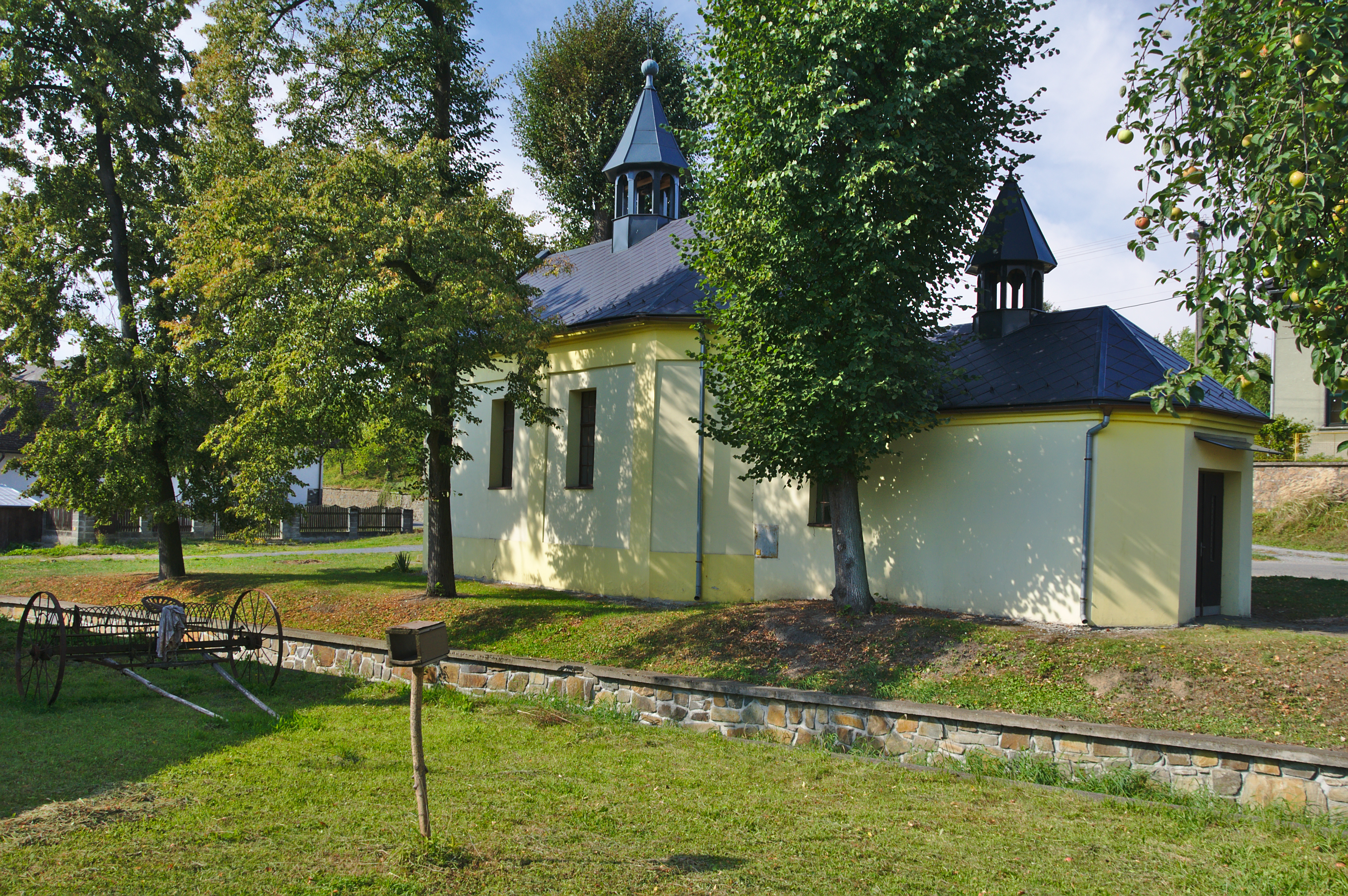
- Chapel of Saint Anthony of Padua

- Flag Coat of arms

- Location in the Czech Republic
- Coordinates: 49°33′18″N 17°28′32″E
- Country: Czech Republic
- Region: Olomouc
- District: Přerov
- First mentioned: 1203

Area
  - Total: 3.39 km^{2} (1.31 sq mi)
- Elevation: 319 m (1,047 ft)

Population (2026-01-01)
  - Total: 289
  - Density: 85.3/km^{2} (221/sq mi)
- Time zone: UTC+1 (CET)
  - Summer (DST): UTC+2 (CEST)
- Postal code: 751 25
- Website: www.vykleky.cz

Výkleky is a municipality and village in Přerov District in the Olomouc Region of the Czech Republic. It has about 300 inhabitants.

Výkleky lies approximately 12 kilometres (7 mi) north of Přerov, 17 km (11 mi) east of Olomouc, and 228 km (142 mi) east of Prague.

== Demographics ==
Historical population
Year	Pop.	±%
1869	345	—
1880	339	−1.7%
1890	356	+5.0%
1900	392	+10.1%
1910	440	+12.2%
1921	416	−5.5%
1930	453	+8.9%
1950	391	−13.7%
1961	392	+0.3%
1970	337	−14.0%
1980	310	−8.0%
1991	268	−13.5%
2001	268	+0.0%
2011	275	+2.6%
2021	264	−4.0%
Source: Censuses
