= Věžky (Přerov District) =

- Municipality
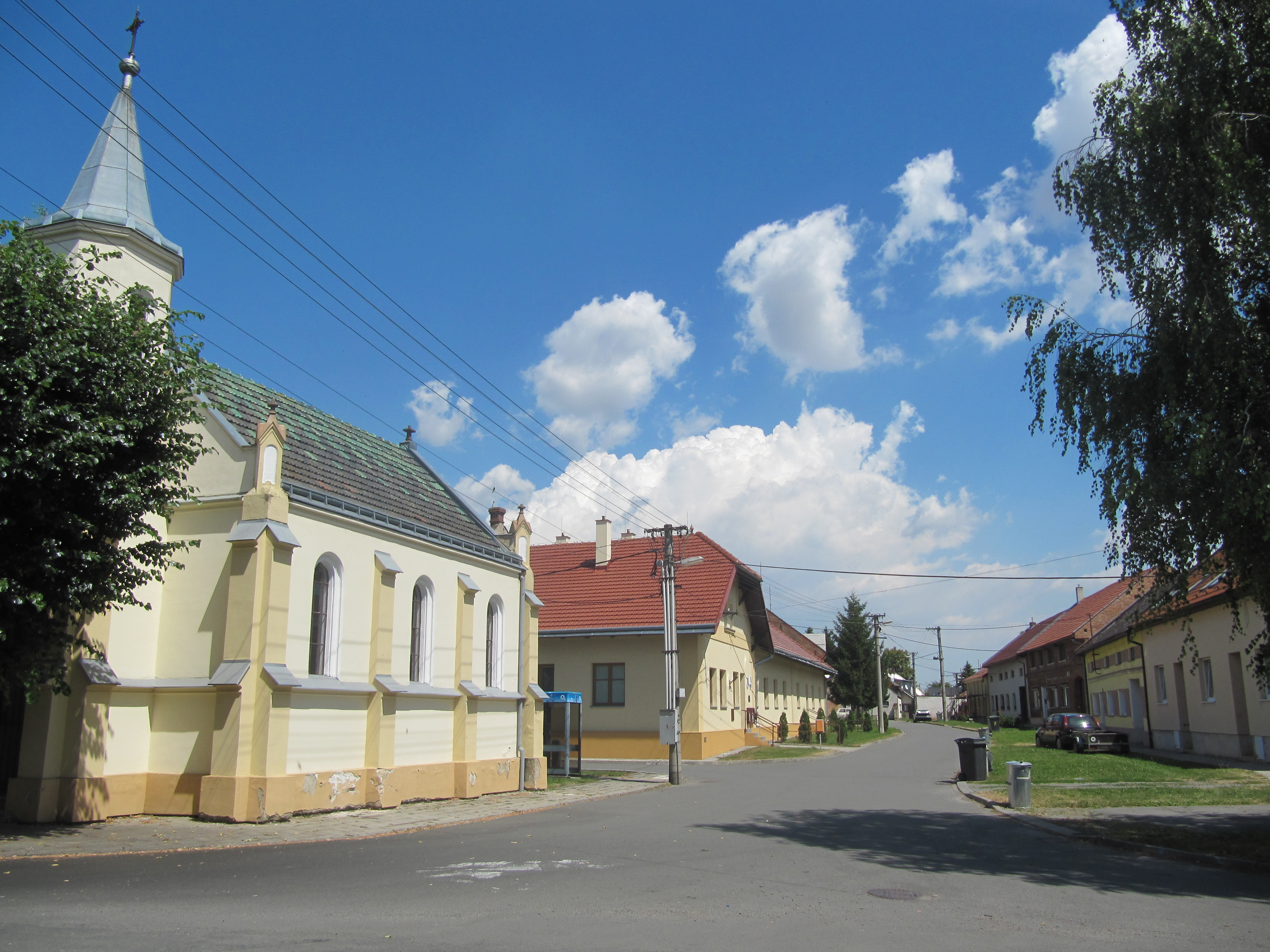
- Main street with the Chapel of the Assumption of the Virgin Mary

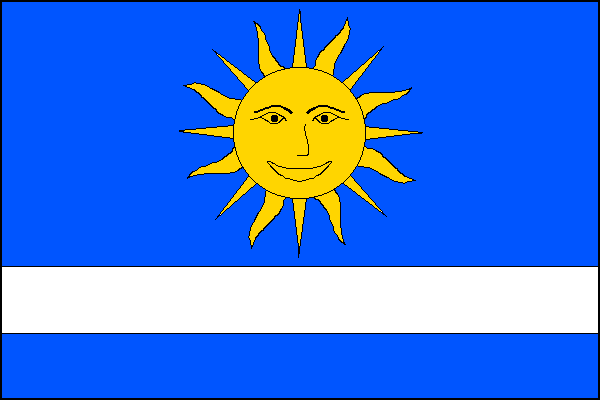
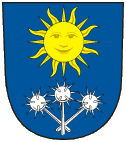
- Flag Coat of arms

- Location in the Czech Republic
- Coordinates: 49°24′18″N 17°25′24″E
- Country: Czech Republic
- Region: Olomouc
- District: Přerov
- First mentioned: 1349

Area
  - Total: 2.40 km^{2} (0.93 sq mi)
- Elevation: 202 m (663 ft)

Population (2026-01-01)
  - Total: 205
  - Density: 85.4/km^{2} (221/sq mi)
- Time zone: UTC+1 (CET)
  - Summer (DST): UTC+2 (CEST)
- Postal code: 751 19
- Website: www.vezkyobec.cz

Věžky is a municipality and village in Přerov District in the Olomouc Region of the Czech Republic. It has about 200 inhabitants.

Věžky lies approximately 6 kilometres (4 mi) south of Přerov, 25 km (16 mi) south-east of Olomouc, and 230 km (140 mi) east of Prague.

== Demographics ==
Historical population
Year	Pop.	±%
1869	247	—
1880	247	+0.0%
1890	302	+22.3%
1900	327	+8.3%
1910	278	−15.0%
1921	290	+4.3%
1930	287	−1.0%
1950	288	+0.3%
1961	321	+11.5%
1970	292	−9.0%
1980	246	−15.8%
1991	190	−22.8%
2001	208	+9.5%
2011	207	−0.5%
2021	202	−2.4%
Source: Censuses
