= Obědkovice =

- Municipality
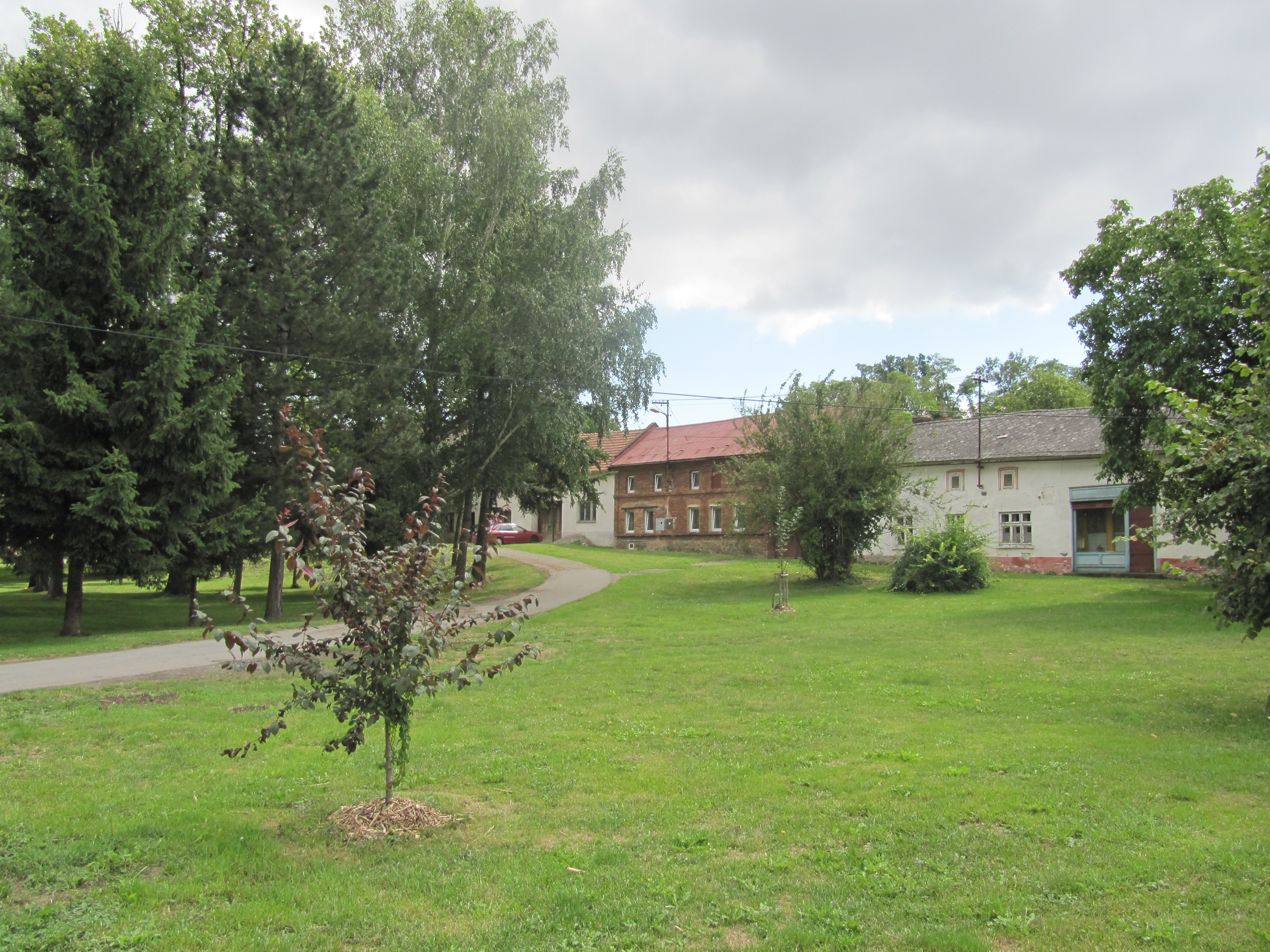
- Centre of Obědkovice

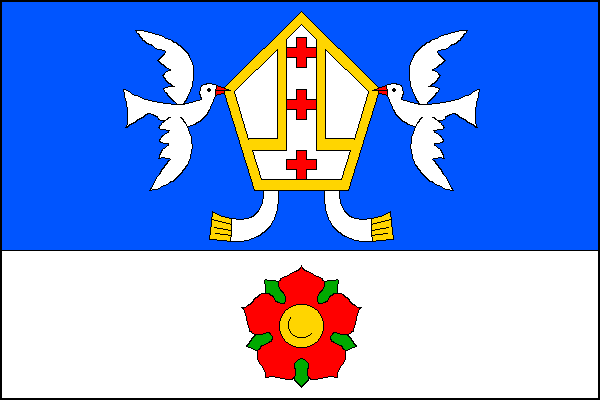
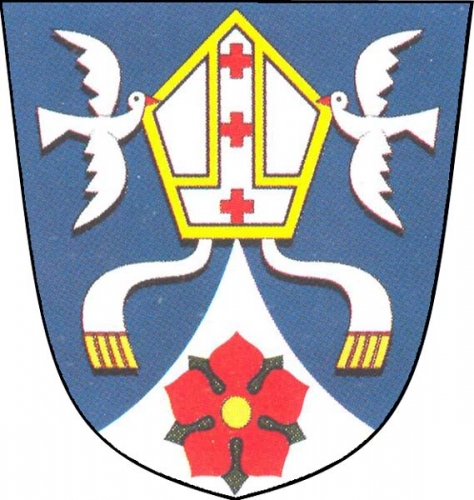
- Flag Coat of arms

- Location in the Czech Republic
- Coordinates: 49°23′39″N 17°13′32″E
- Country: Czech Republic
- Region: Olomouc
- District: Prostějov
- First mentioned: 1078

Area
  - Total: 2.59 km^{2} (1.00 sq mi)
- Elevation: 212 m (696 ft)

Population (2026-01-01)
  - Total: 263
  - Density: 102/km^{2} (263/sq mi)
- Time zone: UTC+1 (CET)
  - Summer (DST): UTC+2 (CEST)
- Postal code: 798 23
- Website: www.obedkovice.cz

Obědkovice is a municipality and village in Prostějov District in the Olomouc Region of the Czech Republic. It has about 300 inhabitants.

Obědkovice lies approximately 12 kilometres (7 mi) south-east of Prostějov, 23 km (14 mi) south of Olomouc, and 216 km (134 mi) east of Prague.

== Demographics ==
Historical population
Year	Pop.	±%
1869	355	—
1880	340	−4.2%
1890	375	+10.3%
1900	373	−0.5%
1910	396	+6.2%
1921	431	+8.8%
1930	471	+9.3%
1950	358	−24.0%
1961	343	−4.2%
1970	326	−5.0%
1980	290	−11.0%
1991	266	−8.3%
2001	267	+0.4%
2011	268	+0.4%
2021	270	+0.7%
Source: Censuses
