= Vincencov =

- Municipality
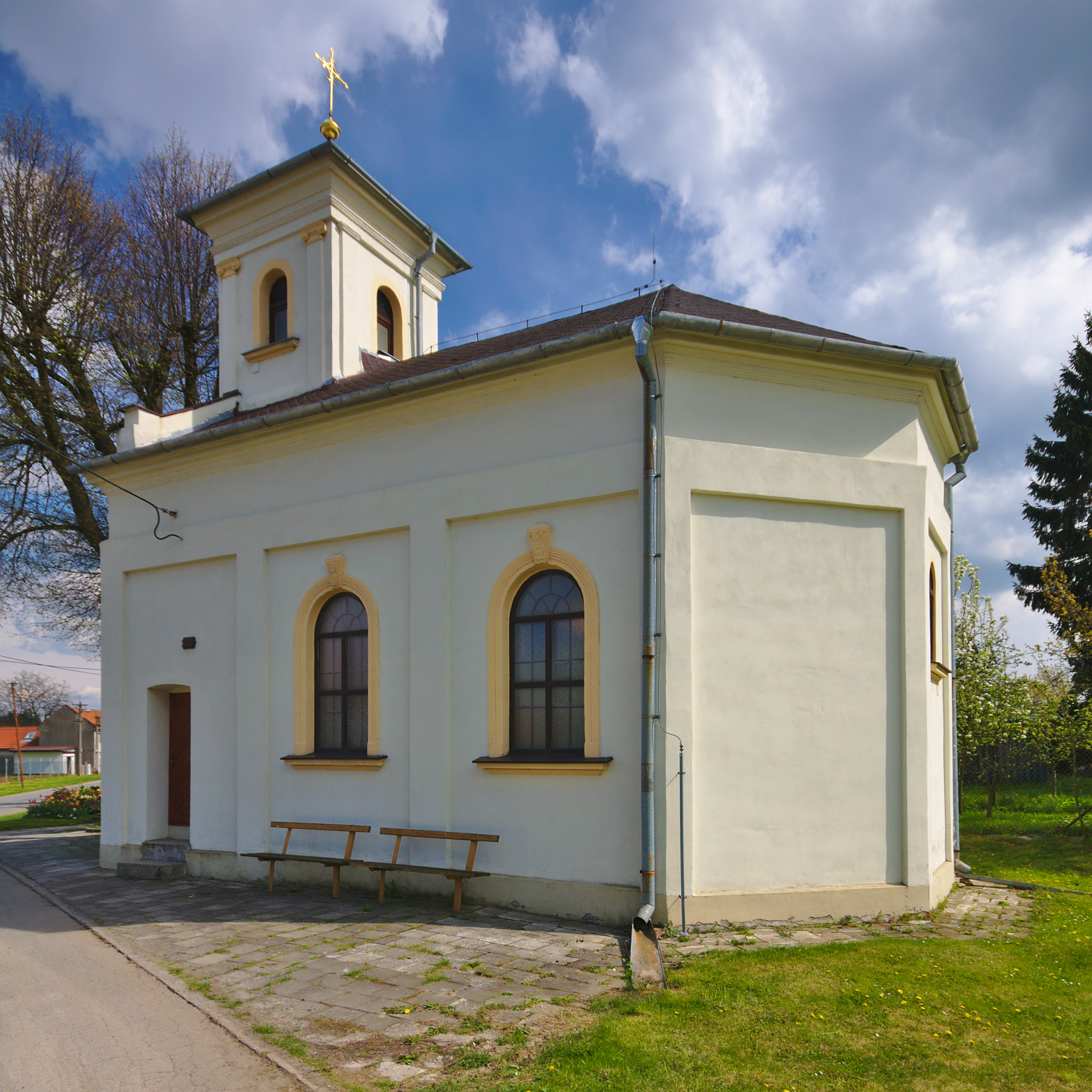
- Chapel of Saint Florian

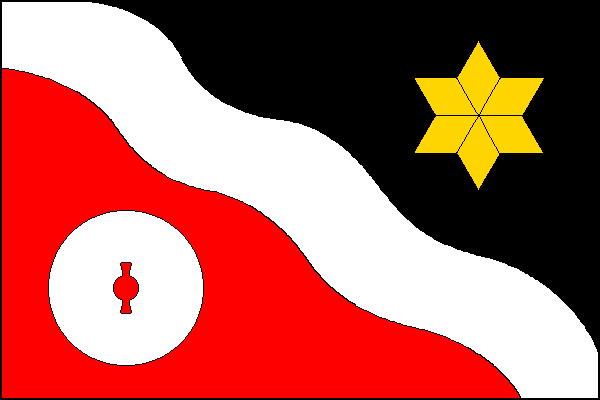
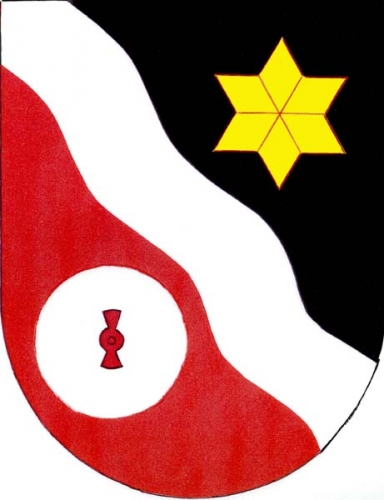
- Flag Coat of arms

- Location in the Czech Republic
- Coordinates: 49°24′21″N 17°3′45″E
- Country: Czech Republic
- Region: Olomouc
- District: Prostějov
- First mentioned: 1795

Area
  - Total: 1.17 km^{2} (0.45 sq mi)
- Elevation: 341 m (1,119 ft)

Population (2026-01-01)
  - Total: 123
  - Density: 105/km^{2} (272/sq mi)
- Time zone: UTC+1 (CET)
  - Summer (DST): UTC+2 (CEST)
- Postal code: 798 04
- Website: www.vincencov.cz

Vincencov is a municipality and village in Prostějov District in the Olomouc Region of the Czech Republic. It has about 100 inhabitants.

Vincencov lies approximately 9 kilometres (6 mi) south-west of Prostějov, 26 km (16 mi) south-west of Olomouc, and 205 km (127 mi) east of Prague.

== Demographics ==
Historical population
Year	Pop.	±%
1869	137	—
1880	141	+2.9%
1890	161	+14.2%
1900	173	+7.5%
1910	207	+19.7%
1921	203	−1.9%
1930	216	+6.4%
1950	219	+1.4%
1961	193	−11.9%
1970	162	−16.1%
1980	127	−21.6%
1991	98	−22.8%
2001	90	−8.2%
2011	118	+31.1%
2021	113	−4.2%
Source: Censuses
