= Stínava =

- Municipality
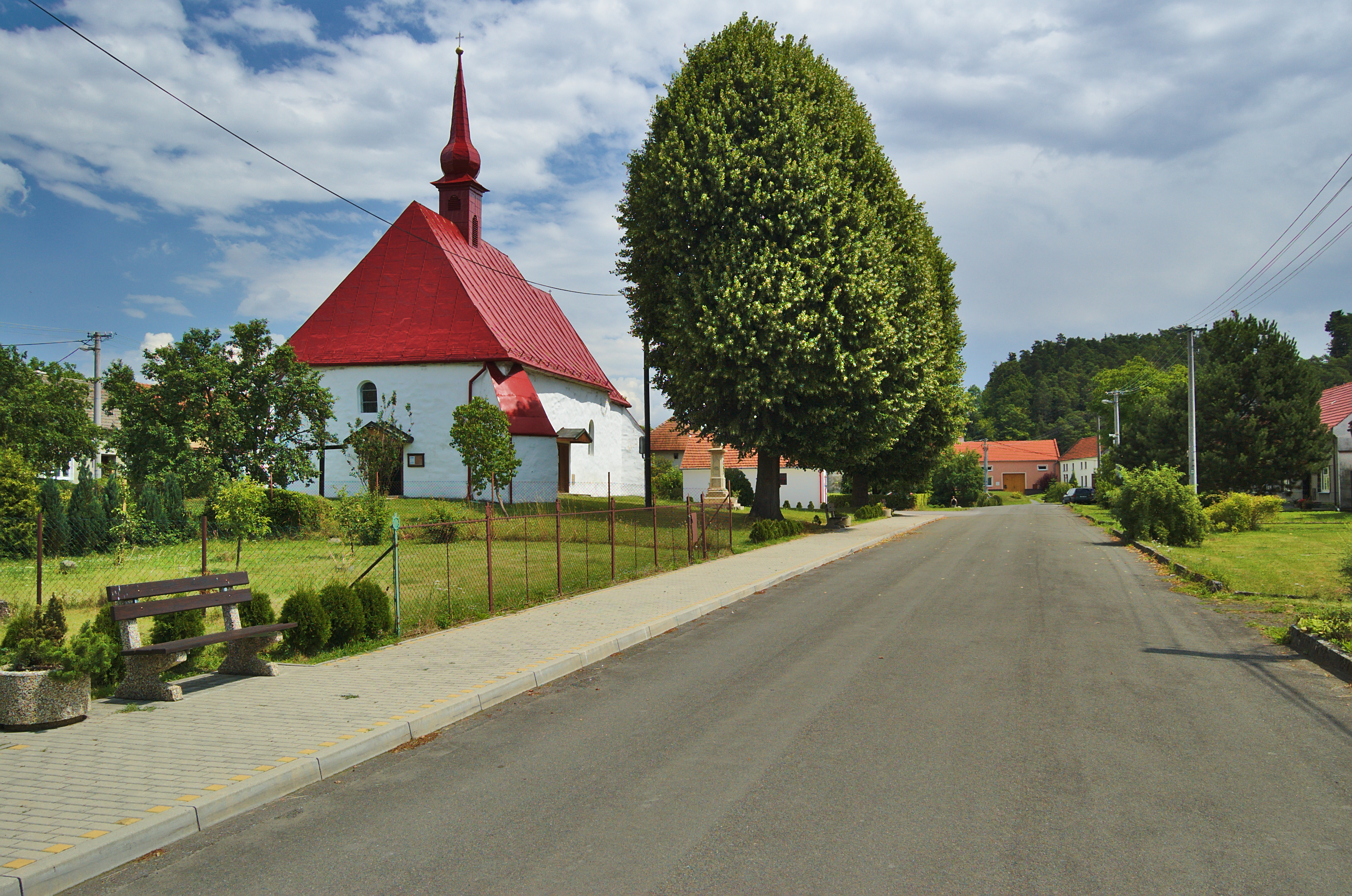
- Church of the Exaltation of the Holy Cross

- Location in the Czech Republic
- Coordinates: 49°29′43″N 16°56′4″E
- Country: Czech Republic
- Region: Olomouc
- District: Prostějov
- First mentioned: 1223

Area
  - Total: 4.52 km^{2} (1.75 sq mi)
- Elevation: 400 m (1,300 ft)

Population (2026-01-01)
  - Total: 160
  - Density: 35/km^{2} (92/sq mi)
- Time zone: UTC+1 (CET)
  - Summer (DST): UTC+2 (CEST)
- Postal code: 798 03
- Website: www.stinava.cz

Stínava is a municipality and village in Prostějov District in the Olomouc Region of the Czech Republic. It has about 200 inhabitants.

Stínava lies approximately 13 kilometres (8 mi) west of Prostějov, 26 km (16 mi) south-west of Olomouc, and 193 km (120 mi) east of Prague.

== Demographics ==
Historical population
Year	Pop.	±%
1869	315	—
1880	336	+6.7%
1890	351	+4.5%
1900	332	−5.4%
1910	327	−1.5%
1921	329	+0.6%
1930	308	−6.4%
1950	243	−21.1%
1961	265	+9.1%
1970	236	−10.9%
1980	196	−16.9%
1991	145	−26.0%
2001	148	+2.1%
2011	146	−1.4%
2021	158	+8.2%
Source: Censuses
