= Zdětín (Prostějov District) =

- Municipality
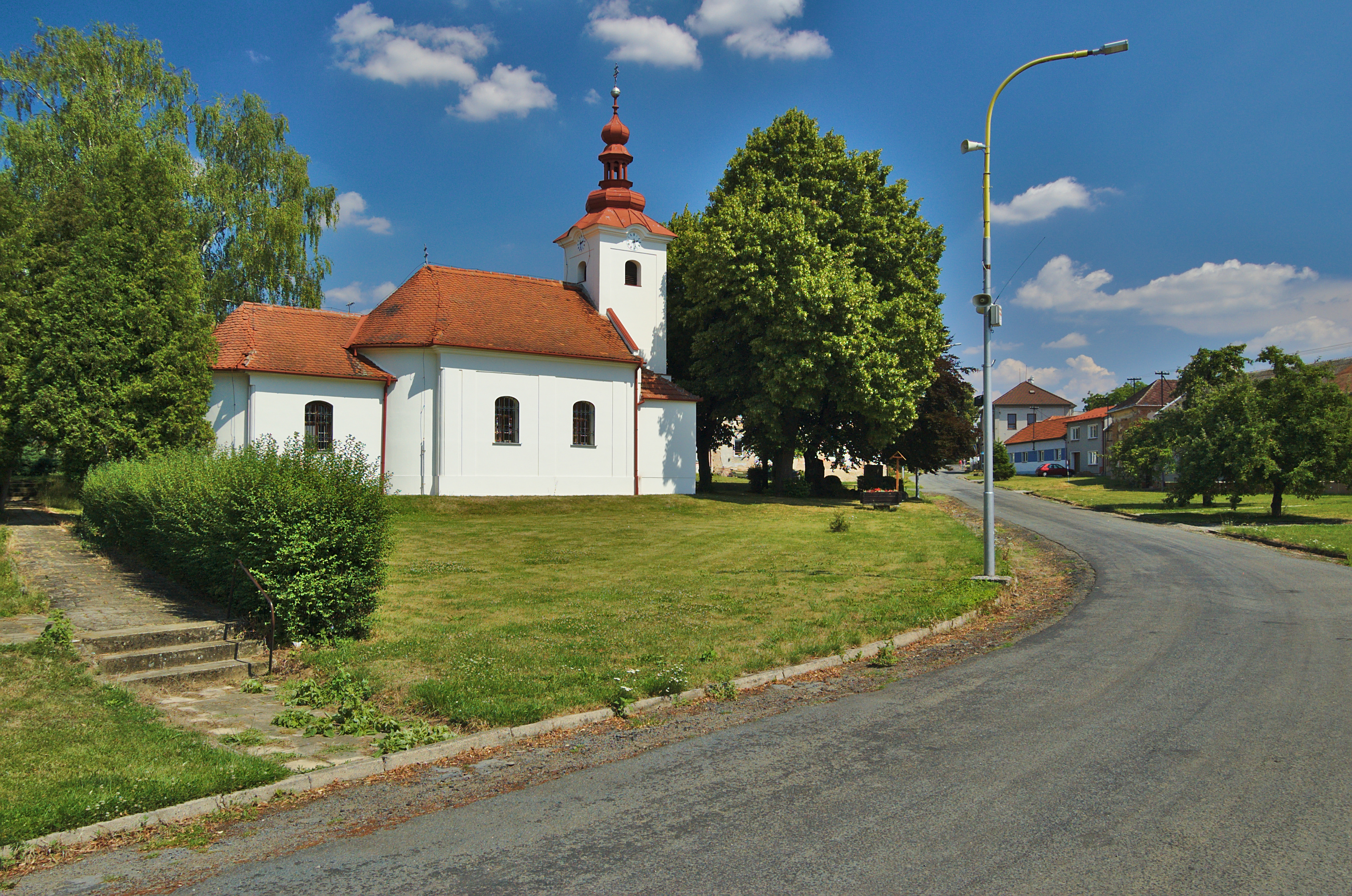
- Chapel of Saint Anne

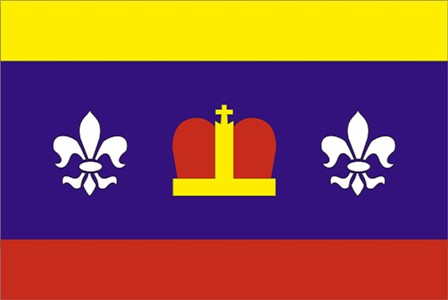
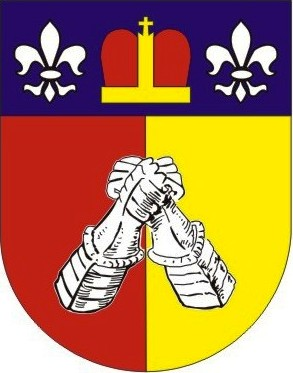
- Flag Coat of arms

- Location in the Czech Republic
- Coordinates: 49°30′21″N 16°59′20″E
- Country: Czech Republic
- Region: Olomouc
- District: Prostějov
- First mentioned: 1368

Area
  - Total: 5.33 km^{2} (2.06 sq mi)
- Elevation: 341 m (1,119 ft)

Population (2026-01-01)
  - Total: 416
  - Density: 78.0/km^{2} (202/sq mi)
- Time zone: UTC+1 (CET)
  - Summer (DST): UTC+2 (CEST)
- Postal code: 798 43
- Website: www.obeczdetin.cz

Zdětín is a municipality and village in Prostějov District in the Olomouc Region of the Czech Republic. It has about 400 inhabitants.

Zdětín lies approximately 10 kilometres (6 mi) north-west of Prostějov, 22 km (14 mi) south-west of Olomouc, and 196 km (122 mi) east of Prague.

== History ==
The first written mention of Zdětín is from 1368. A school was built in 1876.

== Demographics ==
Historical population
Year	Pop.	±%
1869	478	—
1880	532	+11.3%
1890	501	−5.8%
1900	477	−4.8%
1910	502	+5.2%
1921	502	+0.0%
1930	491	−2.2%
1950	440	−10.4%
1961	427	−3.0%
1970	374	−12.4%
1980	320	−14.4%
1991	277	−13.4%
2001	289	+4.3%
2011	293	+1.4%
2021	360	+22.9%
Source: Censuses
