= Stařechovice =

- Municipality
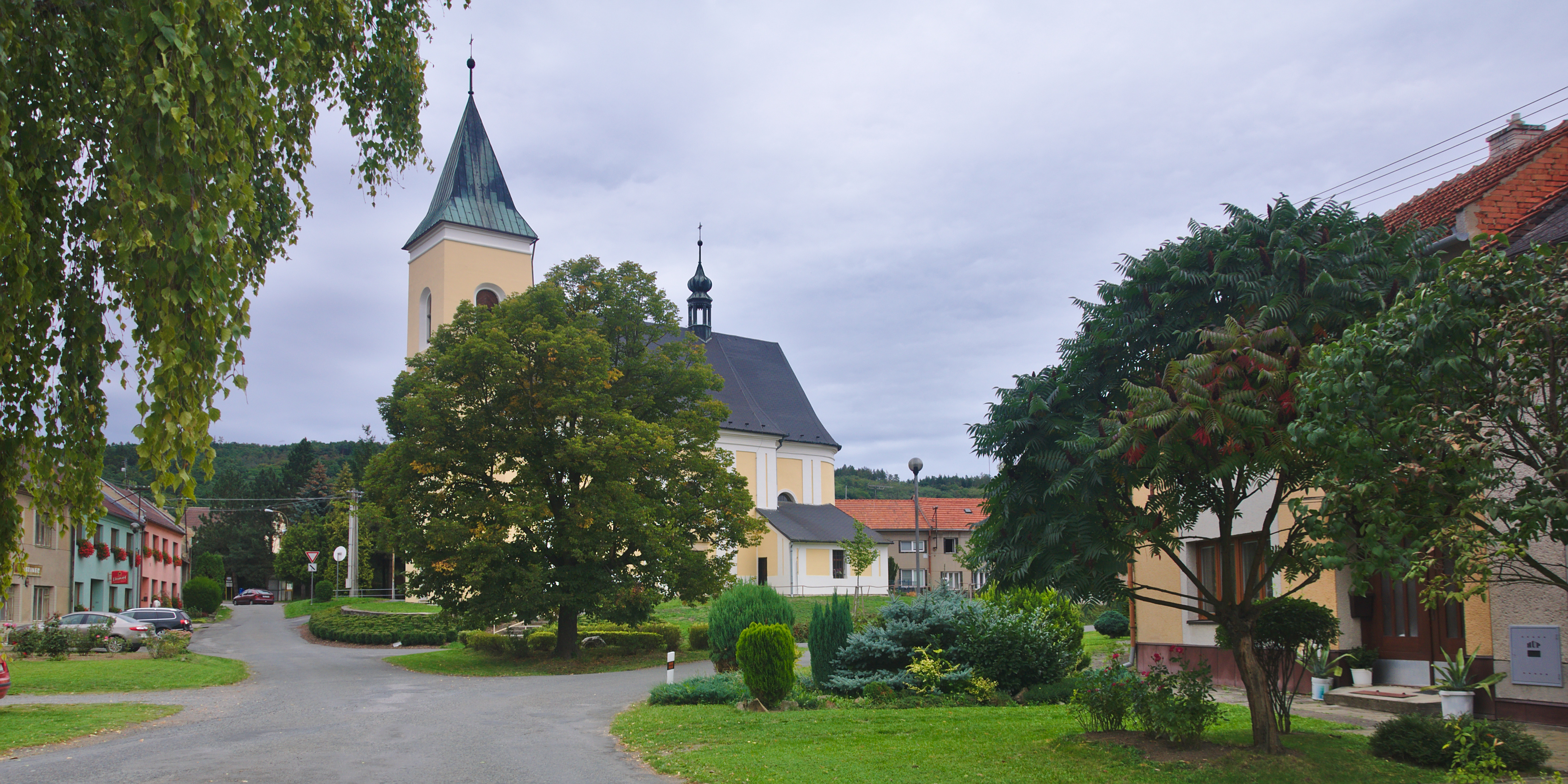
- Church of the Nativity of the Virgin Mary

- Location in the Czech Republic
- Coordinates: 49°31′58″N 17°3′14″E
- Country: Czech Republic
- Region: Olomouc
- District: Prostějov
- First mentioned: 1361

Area
  - Total: 6.60 km^{2} (2.55 sq mi)
- Elevation: 250 m (820 ft)

Population (2026-01-01)
  - Total: 549
  - Density: 83.2/km^{2} (215/sq mi)
- Time zone: UTC+1 (CET)
  - Summer (DST): UTC+2 (CEST)
- Postal code: 798 41
- Website: www.starechovice.cz

Stařechovice is a municipality and village in Prostějov District in the Olomouc Region of the Czech Republic. It has about 500 inhabitants.

Stařechovice lies approximately 9 kilometres (6 mi) north-west of Prostějov, 17 km (11 mi) south-west of Olomouc, and 199 km (124 mi) east of Prague.

== Administrative division ==
Stařechovice consists of two municipal parts (in brackets population according to the 2021 census):

- Stařechovice (366)
- Služín (176)

== Demographics ==
Historical population
| Year | Pop. | ±% |
|---|---|---|
| 1869 | 542 | — |
| 1880 | 619 | +14.2% |
| 1890 | 683 | +10.3% |
| 1900 | 718 | +5.1% |
| 1910 | 703 | −2.1% |
| 1921 | 754 | +7.3% |
| 1930 | 689 | −8.6% |
| 1950 | 714 | +3.6% |
| 1961 | 667 | −6.6% |
| 1970 | 577 | −13.5% |
| 1980 | 547 | −5.2% |
| 1991 | 505 | −7.7% |
| 2001 | 541 | +7.1% |
| 2011 | 523 | −3.3% |
| 2021 | 542 | +3.6% |
Source: Censuses
