= Radvanice (Přerov District) =

- Municipality
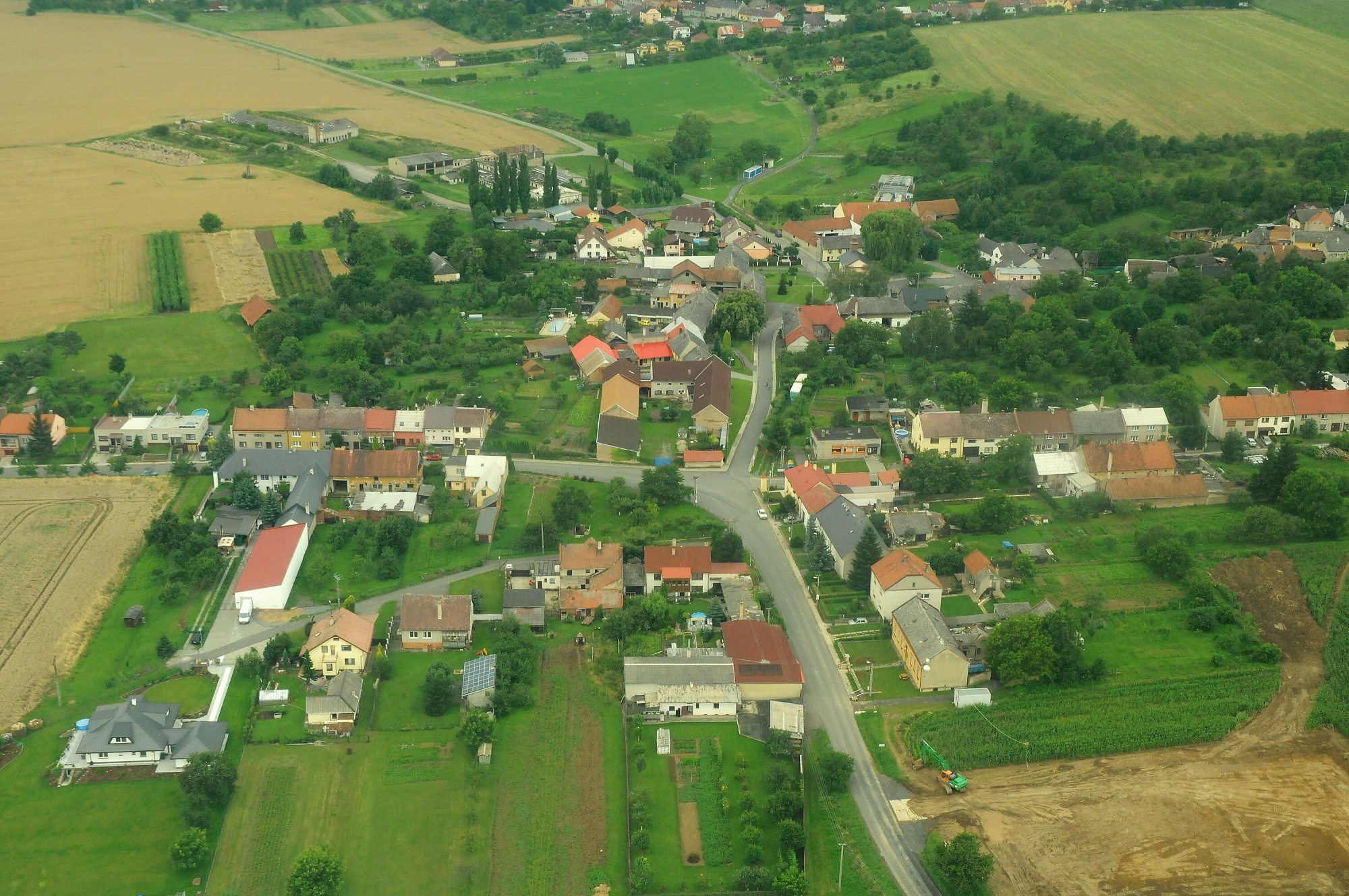
- Aerial view

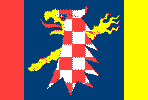
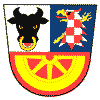
- Flag Coat of arms

- Location in the Czech Republic
- Coordinates: 49°30′35″N 17°28′38″E
- Country: Czech Republic
- Region: Olomouc
- District: Přerov
- First mentioned: 1374

Area
  - Total: 2.92 km^{2} (1.13 sq mi)
- Elevation: 268 m (879 ft)

Population (2026-01-01)
  - Total: 269
  - Density: 92.1/km^{2} (239/sq mi)
- Time zone: UTC+1 (CET)
  - Summer (DST): UTC+2 (CEST)
- Postal code: 751 21
- Website: www.obecradvanice.cz

Radvanice is a municipality and village in Přerov District in the Olomouc Region of the Czech Republic. It has about 300 inhabitants.

Radvanice lies approximately 8 kilometres (5 mi) north of Přerov, 20 km (12 mi) south-east of Olomouc, and 230 km (140 mi) east of Prague.

== Demographics ==
Historical population
Year	Pop.	±%
1869	230	—
1880	288	+25.2%
1890	286	−0.7%
1900	286	+0.0%
1910	299	+4.5%
1921	396	+32.4%
1930	381	−3.8%
1950	339	−11.0%
1961	330	−2.7%
1970	302	−8.5%
1980	255	−15.6%
1991	269	+5.5%
2001	291	+8.2%
2011	277	−4.8%
2021	262	−5.4%
Source: Censuses
