= Sušice (Přerov District) =

- Municipality
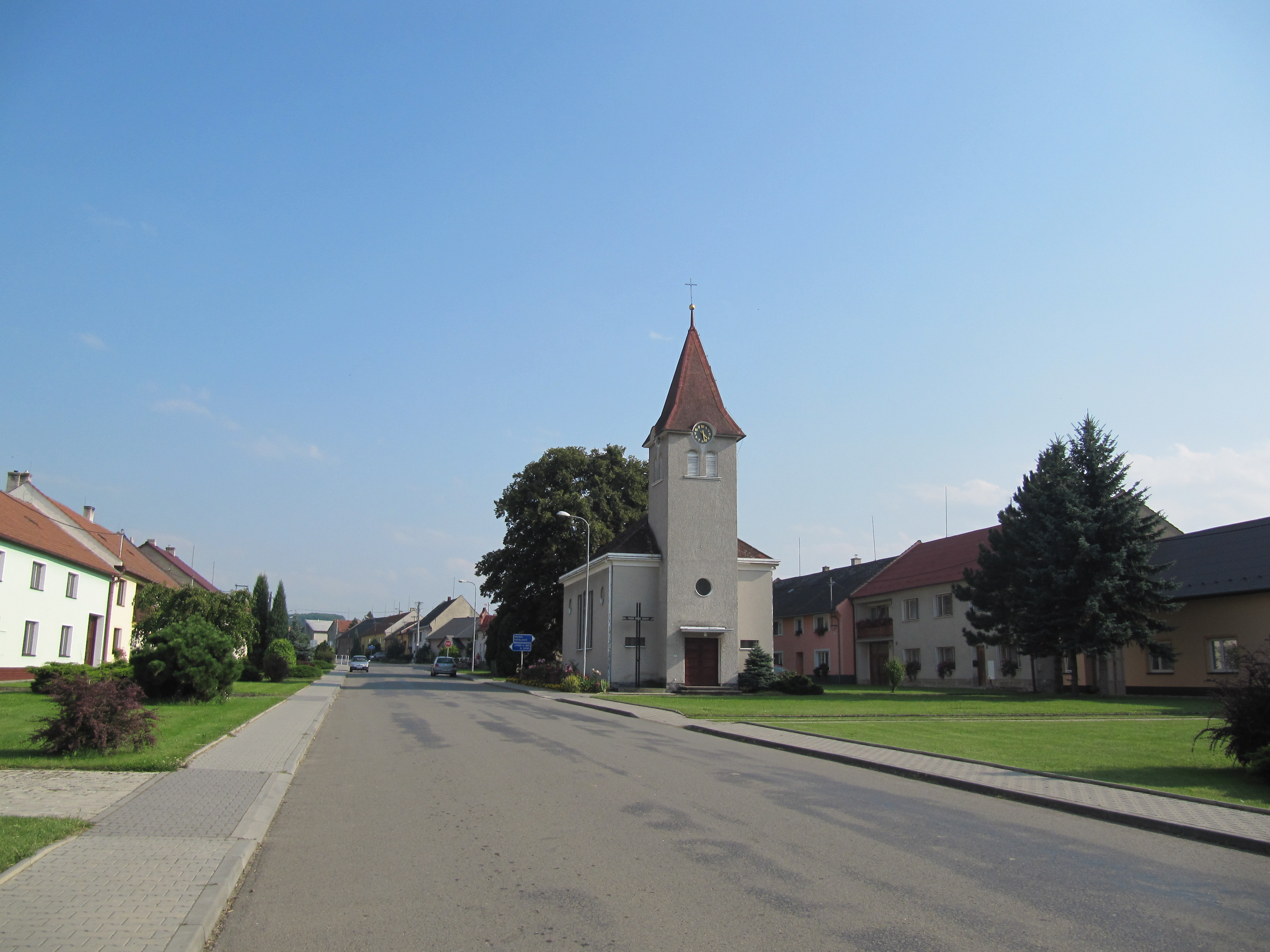
- Chapel of the Visitation of Our Lady

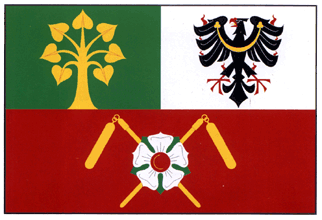
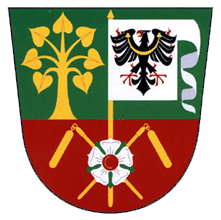
- Flag Coat of arms

- Location in the Czech Republic
- Coordinates: 49°29′9″N 17°32′15″E
- Country: Czech Republic
- Region: Olomouc
- District: Přerov
- First mentioned: 1078

Area
  - Total: 4.85 km^{2} (1.87 sq mi)
- Elevation: 233 m (764 ft)

Population (2026-01-01)
  - Total: 314
  - Density: 64.7/km^{2} (168/sq mi)
- Time zone: UTC+1 (CET)
  - Summer (DST): UTC+2 (CEST)
- Postal code: 751 11
- Website: www.susiceuprerova.cz

Sušice is a municipality and village in Přerov District in the Olomouc Region of the Czech Republic. It has about 300 inhabitants.

== Etymology ==
The name is derived from the personal name Such.

== Geography ==
Sušice is located about 7 kilometres (4 mi) north-east of Přerov and 22 km (14 mi) southeast of Olomouc. It lies on the border between the Moravian Gate and Moravian-Silesian Foothills. The highest point is the hill Přísahanec at 333 m (1,093 ft) above sea level. The Bečva River briefly flows along the northern municipal border.

An integral part of Sušice is the settlement of Kudlov, which is a remnant of the extinct village of Kudlovice.

== History ==
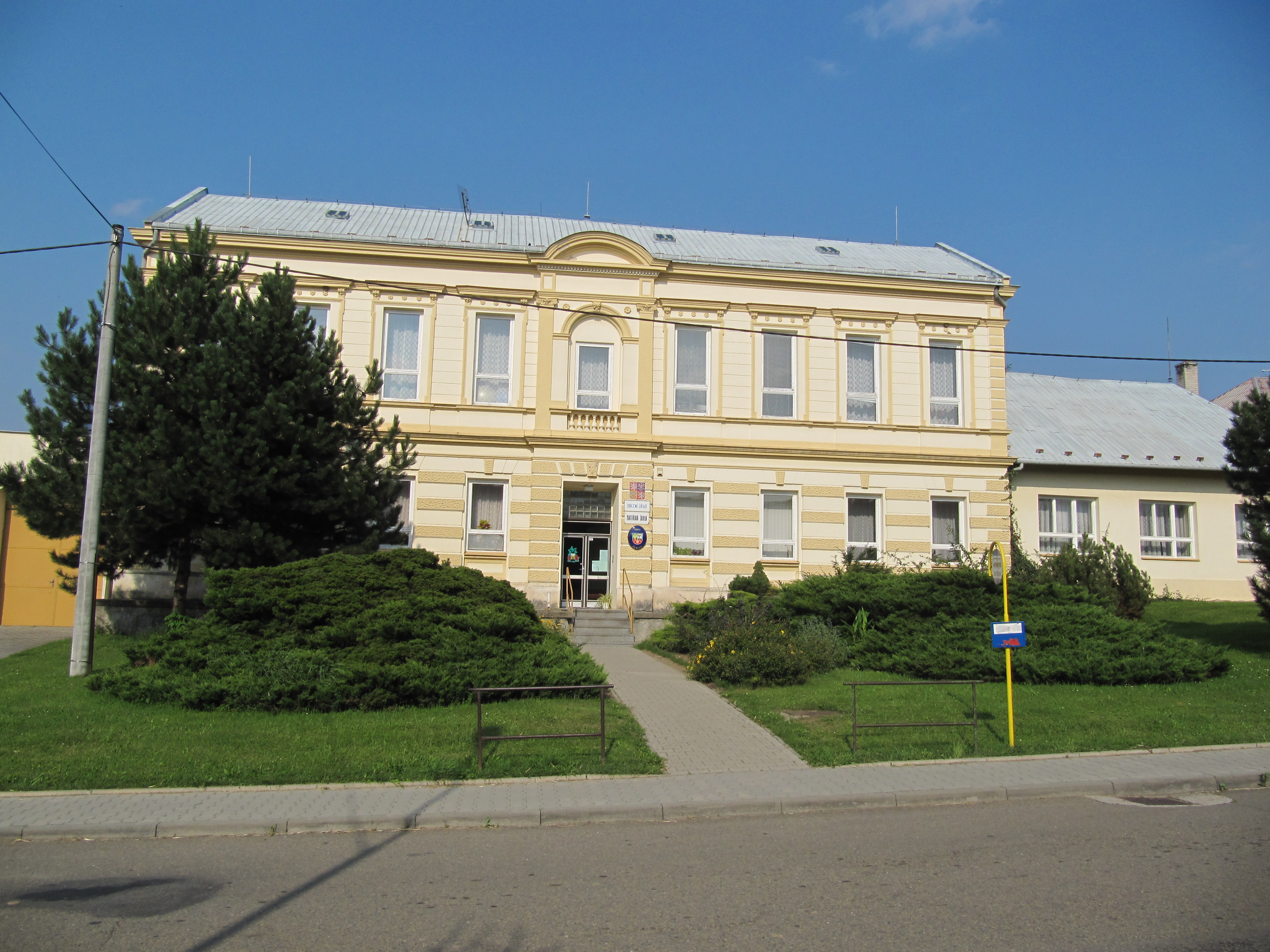
Municipal office

The first written mention of Sušice is from 1078, when the village was donated to the newly founded Hradisko Monastery. Ownership of the village changed frequently over the years. From 1360, the local fortress and village were held by Jan of Sušice. In 1376, Sušice belonged to Ješek Hromada of Horka and Sušice. In 1392, Sušice was bought by Margrave Jošt, who sold it to the Olomouc Chapter in the same year. However, in 1465, King George of Poděbrady gave Sušice together with other capitular villages to Jiří Ctibor of Cimburk.

From 1609, Sušice belonged to the then owner of the Helfštýn estate, Jiří Bruntálský of Vrbno. He died during the Bohemian Revolt and his properties were confiscated, so in 1622 the village came back into the hands of the Olomouc Chapter. In 1848, serfdom was abolished and Sušice became an independent municipality.

== Demographics ==
Historical population

Year	Pop.	±%
1869	357	—
1880	378	+5.9%
1890	404	+6.9%
1900	357	−11.6%
1910	365	+2.2%

Year	Pop.	±%
1921	376	+3.0%
1930	392	+4.3%
1950	381	−2.8%
1961	392	+2.9%
1970	403	+2.8%

Year	Pop.	±%
1980	372	−7.7%
1991	348	−6.5%
2001	340	−2.3%
2011	309	−9.1%
2021	290	−6.1%

Source: Censuses

== Transport ==
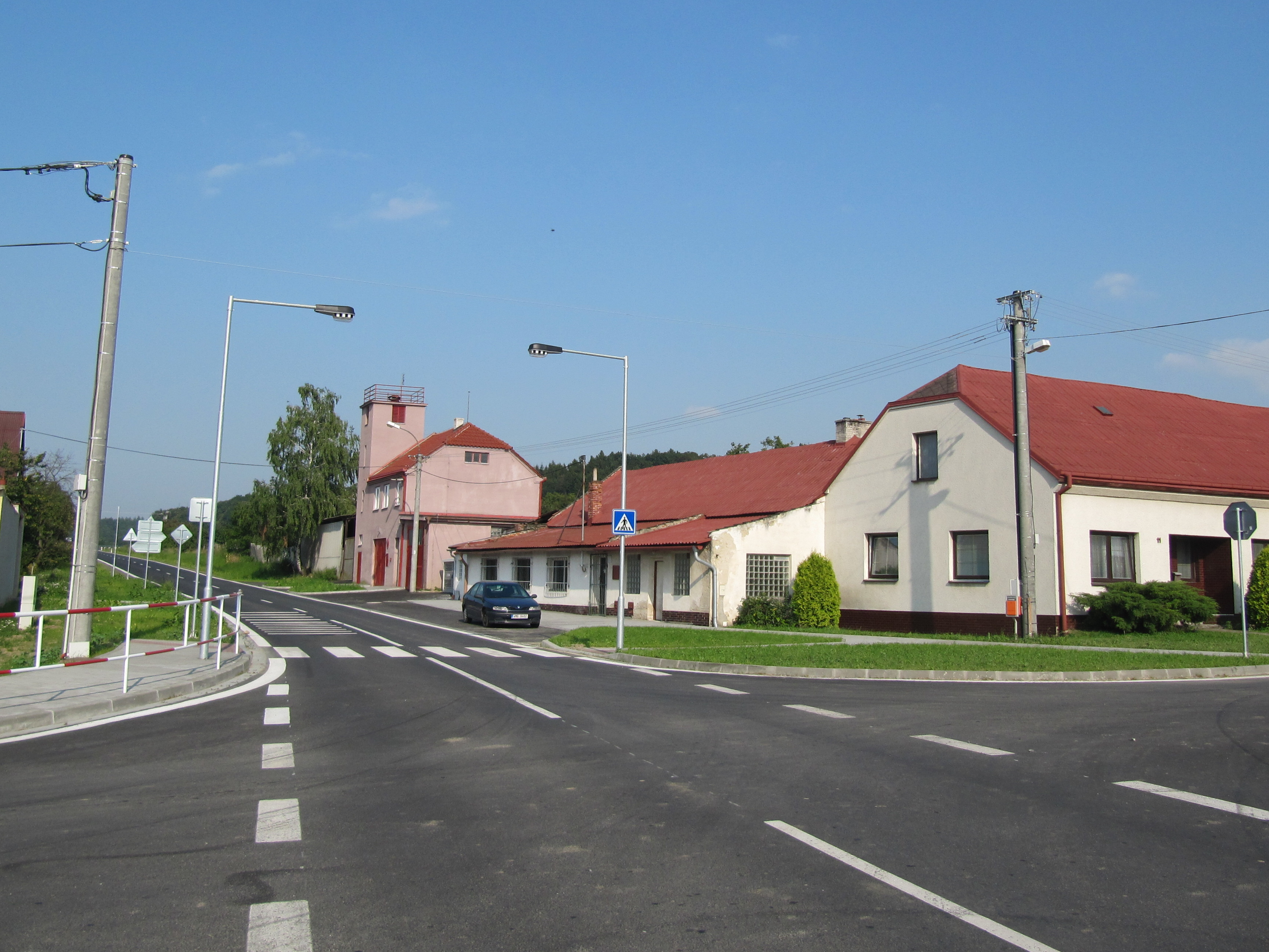
Crossroads in the direction of Lipník nad Bečvou

There are no railways or major roads passing through the municipality.

== Sights ==
There are no protected cultural monuments in the municipality. Among the landmarks of Sušice are the Chapel of the Visitation of the Virgin Mary and a statue of Saint Anthony of Padua.
