= Čelčice =

- Municipality
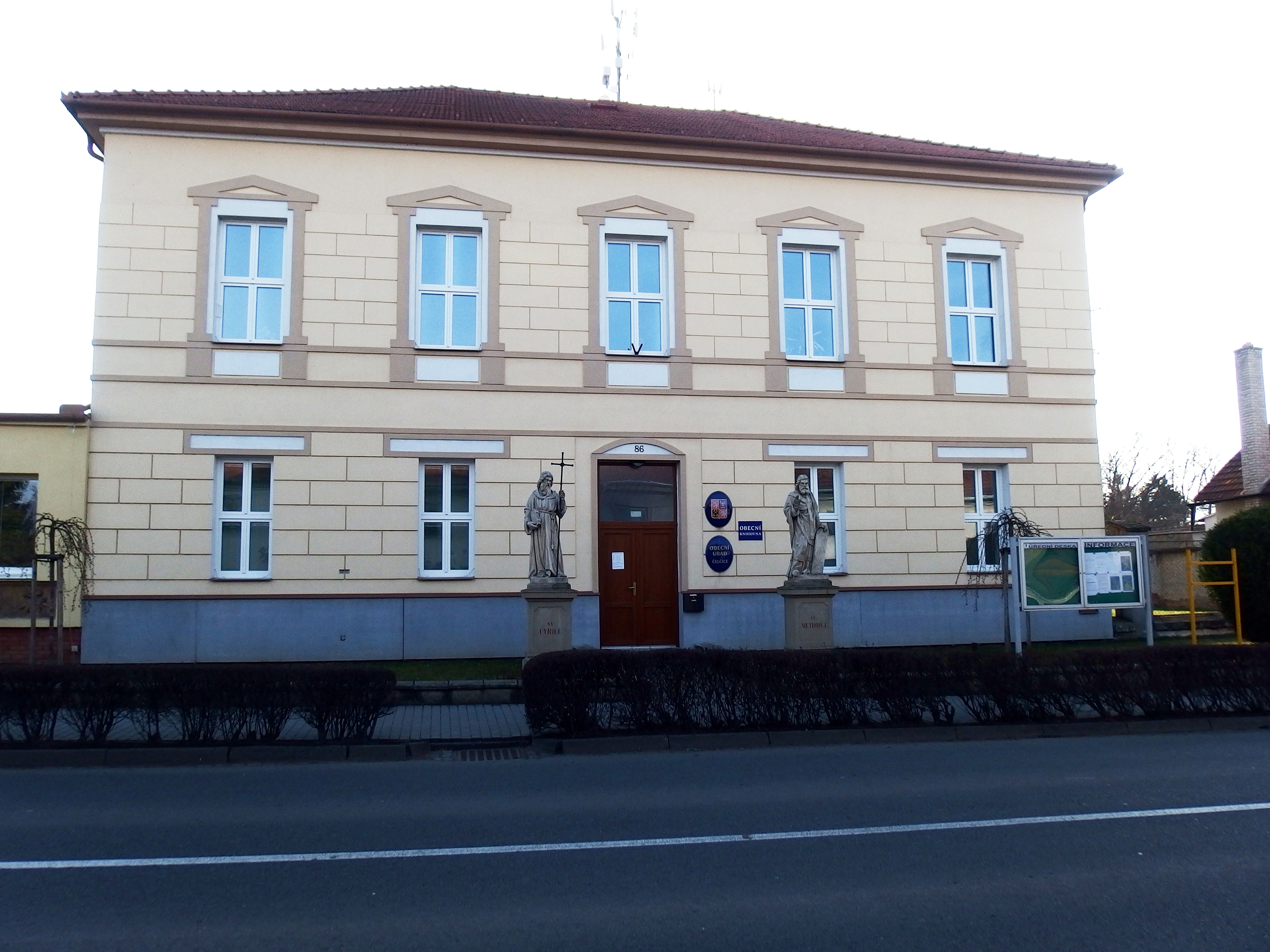
- Municipal office

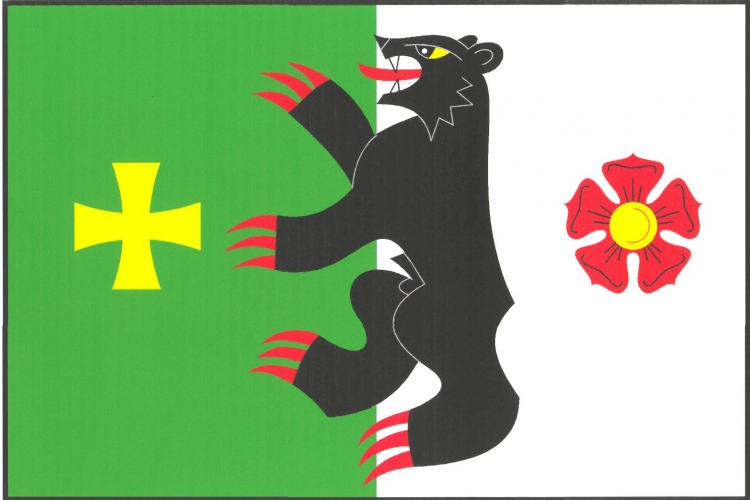
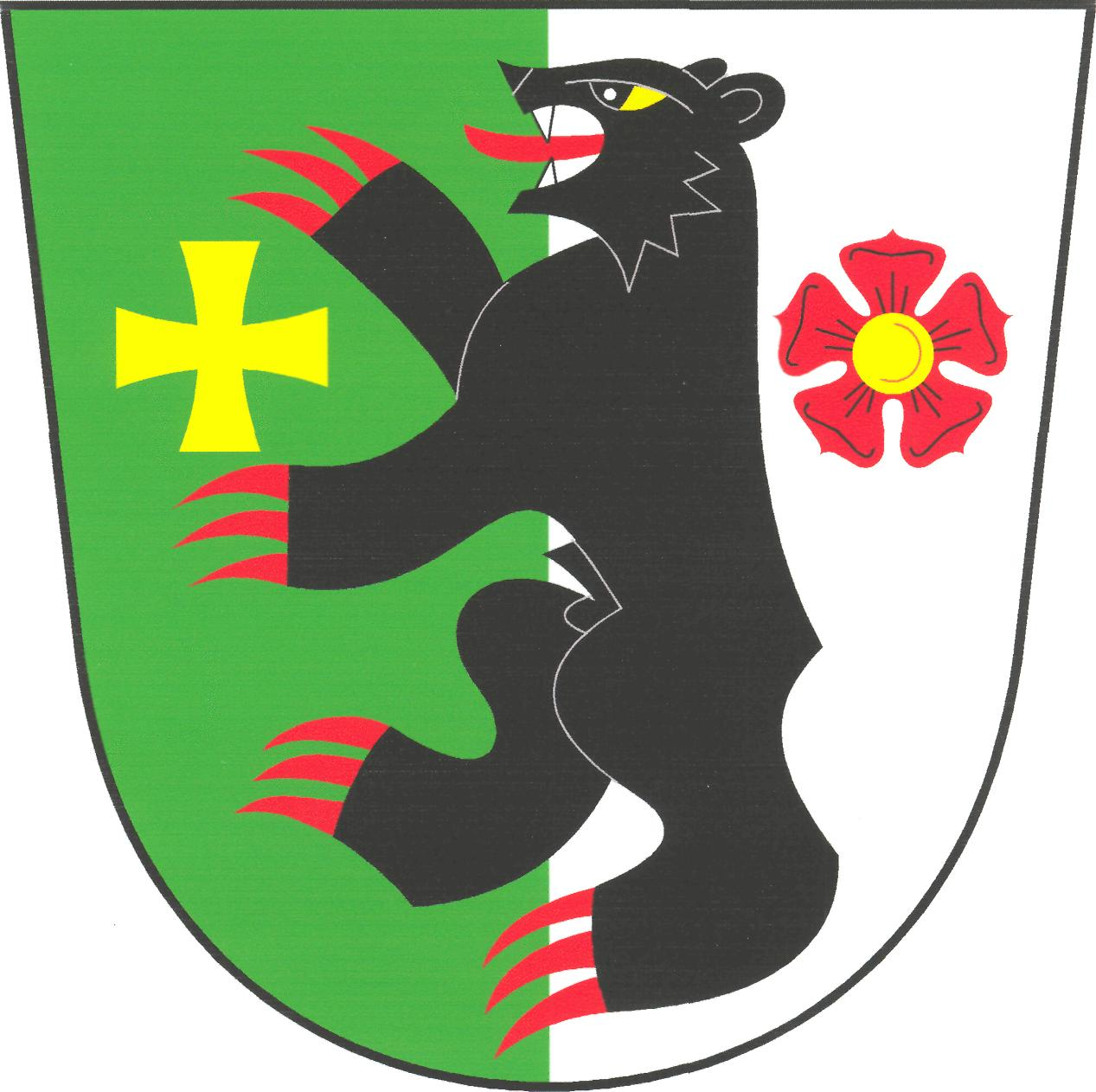
- Flag Coat of arms

- Location in the Czech Republic
- Coordinates: 49°24′44″N 17°11′37″E
- Country: Czech Republic
- Region: Olomouc
- District: Prostějov
- First mentioned: 1342

Area
  - Total: 4.91 km^{2} (1.90 sq mi)
- Elevation: 209 m (686 ft)

Population (2026-01-01)
  - Total: 514
  - Density: 105/km^{2} (271/sq mi)
- Time zone: UTC+1 (CET)
  - Summer (DST): UTC+2 (CEST)
- Postal code: 798 23
- Website: www.celcice.eu

Čelčice is a municipality and village in Prostějov District in the Olomouc Region of the Czech Republic. It has about 500 inhabitants.

Čelčice lies approximately 9 kilometres (6 mi) south-east of Prostějov, 21 km (13 mi) south of Olomouc, and 213 km (132 mi) east of Prague.

== Demographics ==
Historical population
Year	Pop.	±%
1869	391	—
1880	425	+8.7%
1890	474	+11.5%
1900	474	+0.0%
1910	540	+13.9%
1921	569	+5.4%
1930	667	+17.2%
1950	536	−19.6%
1961	569	+6.2%
1970	527	−7.4%
1980	479	−9.1%
1991	469	−2.1%
2001	558	+19.0%
2011	514	−7.9%
2021	489	−4.9%
Source: Censuses
