= Držovice =

- Municipality
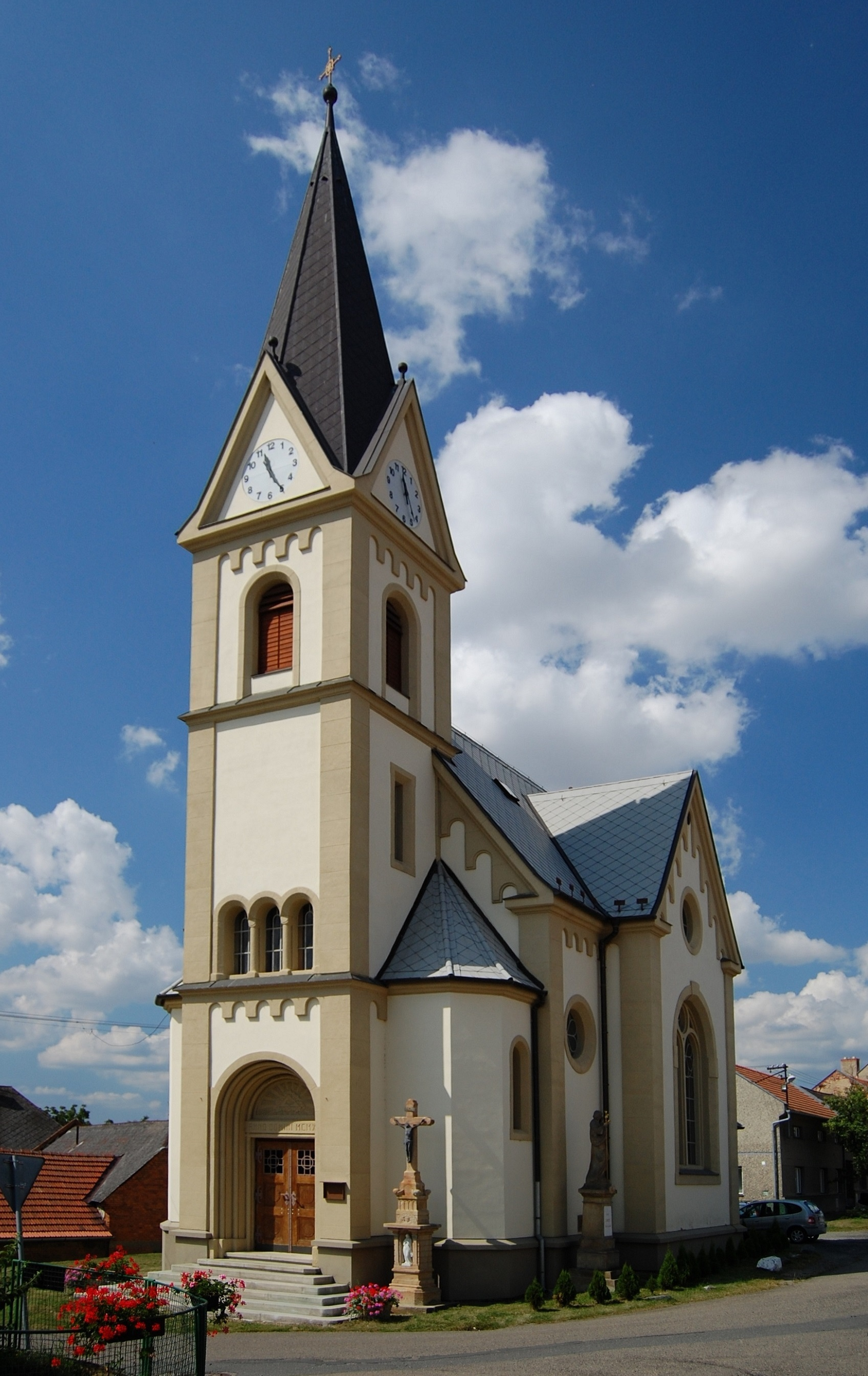
- Church of Saint Florian

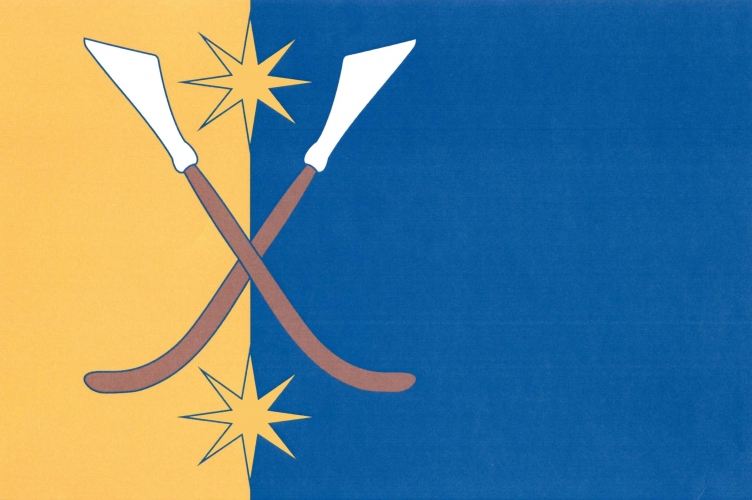
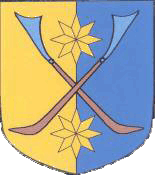
- Flag Coat of arms

- Location in the Czech Republic
- Coordinates: 49°29′28″N 17°8′3″E
- Country: Czech Republic
- Region: Olomouc
- District: Prostějov
- First mentioned: 1141

Area
  - Total: 7.54 km^{2} (2.91 sq mi)
- Elevation: 225 m (738 ft)

Population (2026-01-01)
  - Total: 1,726
  - Density: 229/km^{2} (593/sq mi)
- Time zone: UTC+1 (CET)
  - Summer (DST): UTC+2 (CEST)
- Postal code: 796 07
- Website: www.drzovice.cz

Držovice is a municipality and village in Prostějov District in the Olomouc Region of the Czech Republic. It has about 1,700 inhabitants.

Držovice lies approximately 3 kilometres (2 mi) north-east of Prostějov, 15 km (9 mi) south-west of Olomouc, and 206 km (128 mi) east of Prague.

== Demographics ==
Historical population
Year	Pop.	±%
1869	702	—
1880	837	+19.2%
1890	822	−1.8%
1900	1,039	+26.4%
1910	1,148	+10.5%
1921	1,051	−8.4%
1930	1,178	+12.1%
1950	1,429	+21.3%
1961	1,472	+3.0%
1970	1,290	−12.4%
1980	1,238	−4.0%
1991	1,176	−5.0%
2001	1,249	+6.2%
2011	1,320	+5.7%
2021	1,405	+6.4%
Source: Censuses
