= Stará Ves (Přerov District) =

- Municipality
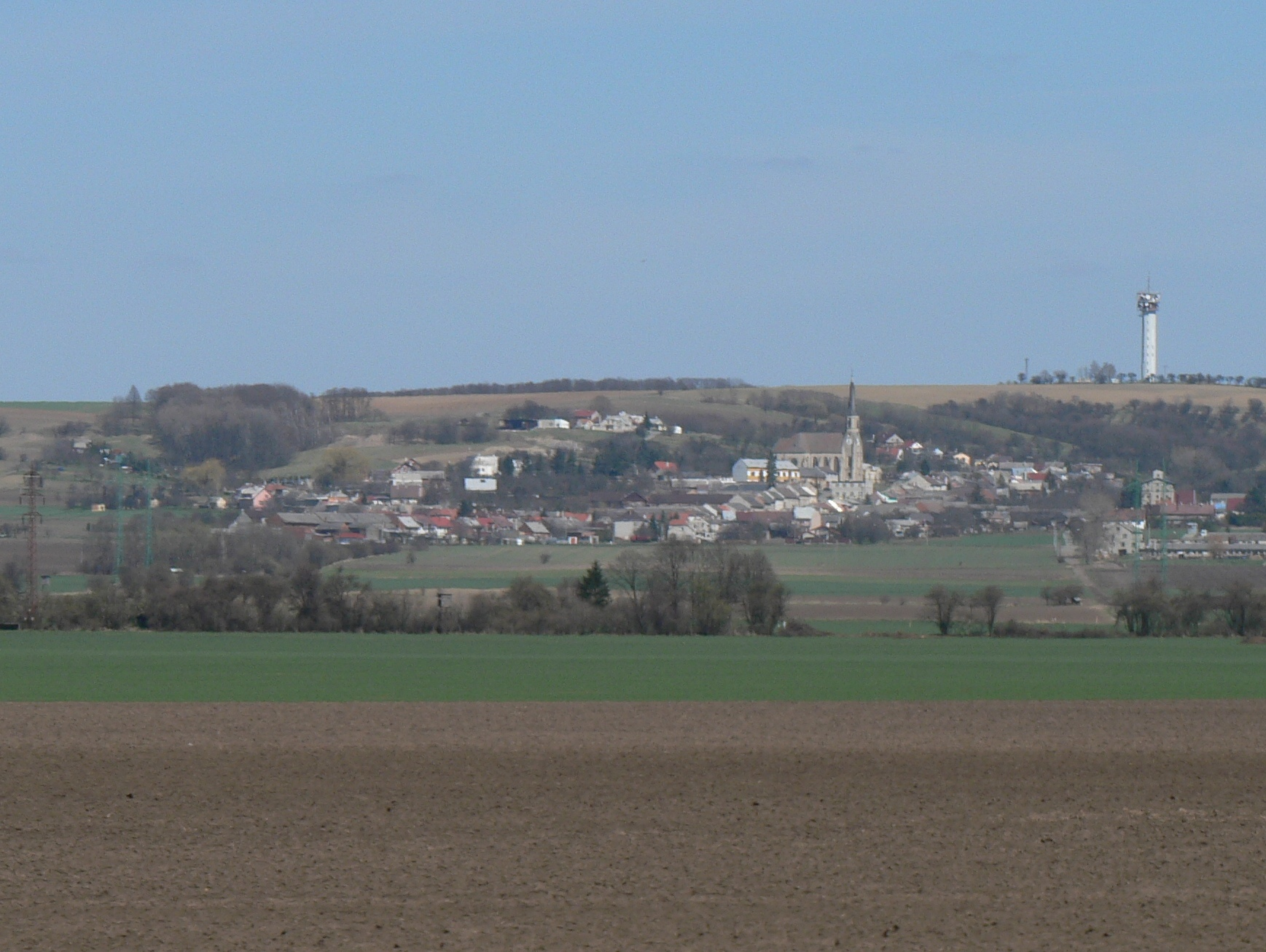
- View from the west

- Flag Coat of arms

- Location in the Czech Republic
- Coordinates: 49°22′50″N 17°29′30″E
- Country: Czech Republic
- Region: Olomouc
- District: Přerov
- First mentioned: 1261

Area
  - Total: 9.32 km^{2} (3.60 sq mi)
- Elevation: 270 m (890 ft)

Population (2026-01-01)
  - Total: 619
  - Density: 66.4/km^{2} (172/sq mi)
- Time zone: UTC+1 (CET)
  - Summer (DST): UTC+2 (CEST)
- Postal code: 750 02
- Website: www.obecstaraves.cz

Stará Ves is a municipality and village in Přerov District in the Olomouc Region of the Czech Republic. It has about 600 inhabitants.

Stará Ves lies approximately 9 kilometres (6 mi) south of Přerov, 30 km (19 mi) south-east of Olomouc, and 235 km (146 mi) east of Prague.

== Demographics ==
Historical population
Year	Pop.	±%
1869	712	—
1880	732	+2.8%
1890	772	+5.5%
1900	804	+4.1%
1910	921	+14.6%
1921	892	−3.1%
1930	911	+2.1%
1950	785	−13.8%
1961	802	+2.2%
1970	754	−6.0%
1980	658	−12.7%
1991	540	−17.9%
2001	577	+6.9%
2011	621	+7.6%
2021	584	−6.0%
Source: Censuses
