= Vlkoš (Přerov District) =

- Municipality
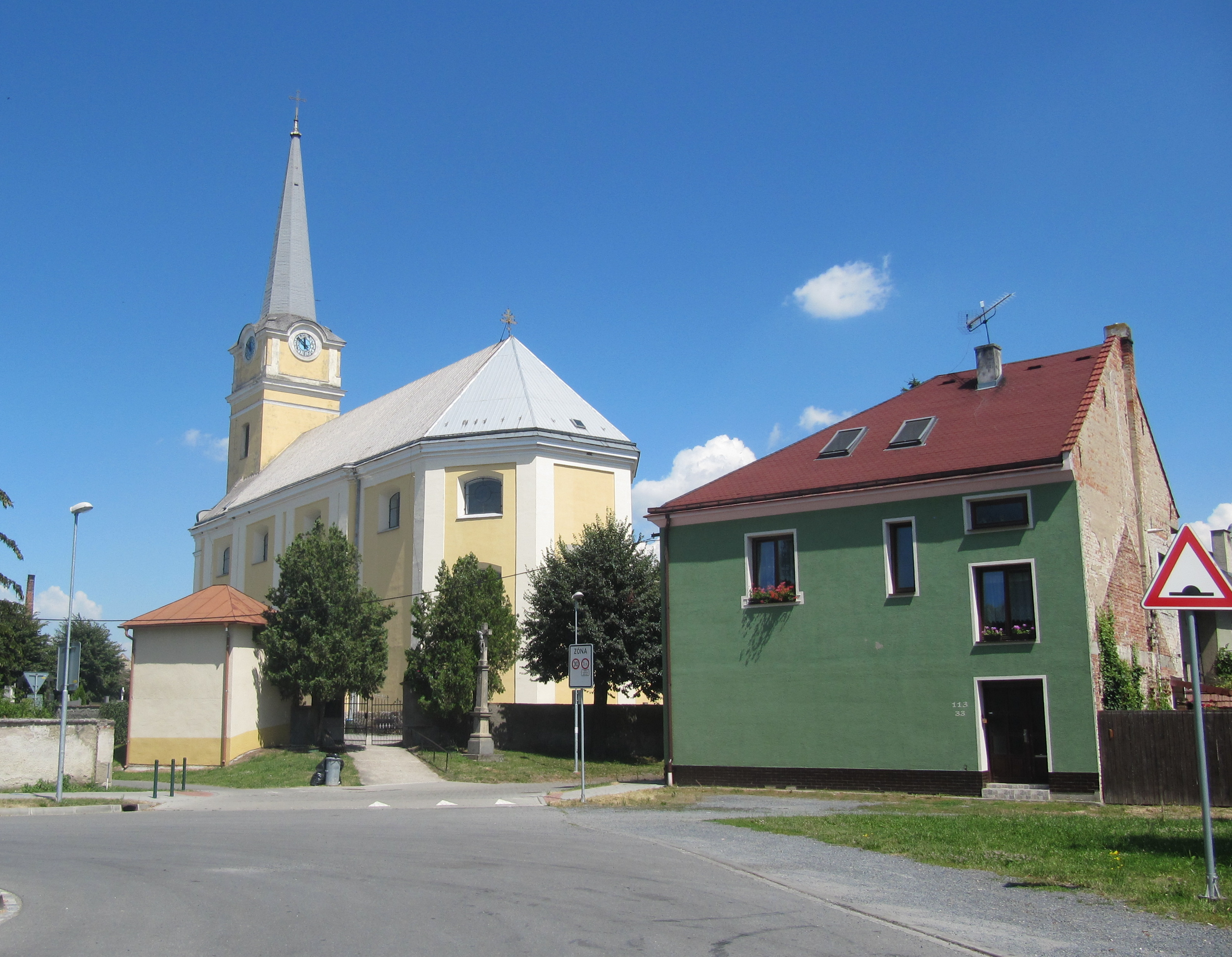
- Centre with the Church of Saint Procopius

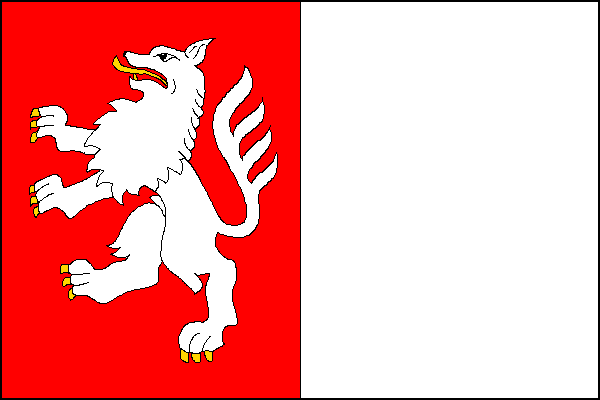
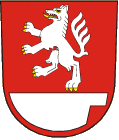
- Flag Coat of arms

- Location in the Czech Republic
- Coordinates: 49°23′45″N 17°25′9″E
- Country: Czech Republic
- Region: Olomouc
- District: Přerov
- First mentioned: 1294

Area
  - Total: 8.95 km^{2} (3.46 sq mi)
- Elevation: 200 m (660 ft)

Population (2026-01-01)
  - Total: 666
  - Density: 74.4/km^{2} (193/sq mi)
- Time zone: UTC+1 (CET)
  - Summer (DST): UTC+2 (CEST)
- Postal code: 751 19
- Website: www.obecvlkos.cz

Vlkoš is a municipality and village in Přerov District in the Olomouc Region of the Czech Republic. It has about 700 inhabitants.

Vlkoš lies approximately 8 kilometres (5 mi) south-west of Přerov, 25 km (16 mi) south-east of Olomouc, and 228 km (142 mi) east of Prague.

== Administrative division ==
Vlkoš consists of two municipal parts (in brackets population according to the 2021 census):

- Vlkoš (518)
- Kanovsko (125)

== Demographics ==
Historical population
Year	Pop.	±%
1869	901	—
1880	1,040	+15.4%
1890	1,069	+2.8%
1900	1,090	+2.0%
1910	1,180	+8.3%
1921	1,168	−1.0%
1930	1,109	−5.1%
1950	991	−10.6%
1961	936	−5.5%
1970	849	−9.3%
1980	756	−11.0%
1991	733	−3.0%
2001	744	+1.5%
2011	678	−8.9%
2021	643	−5.2%
Source: Censuses
