= Bochoř =

- Municipality
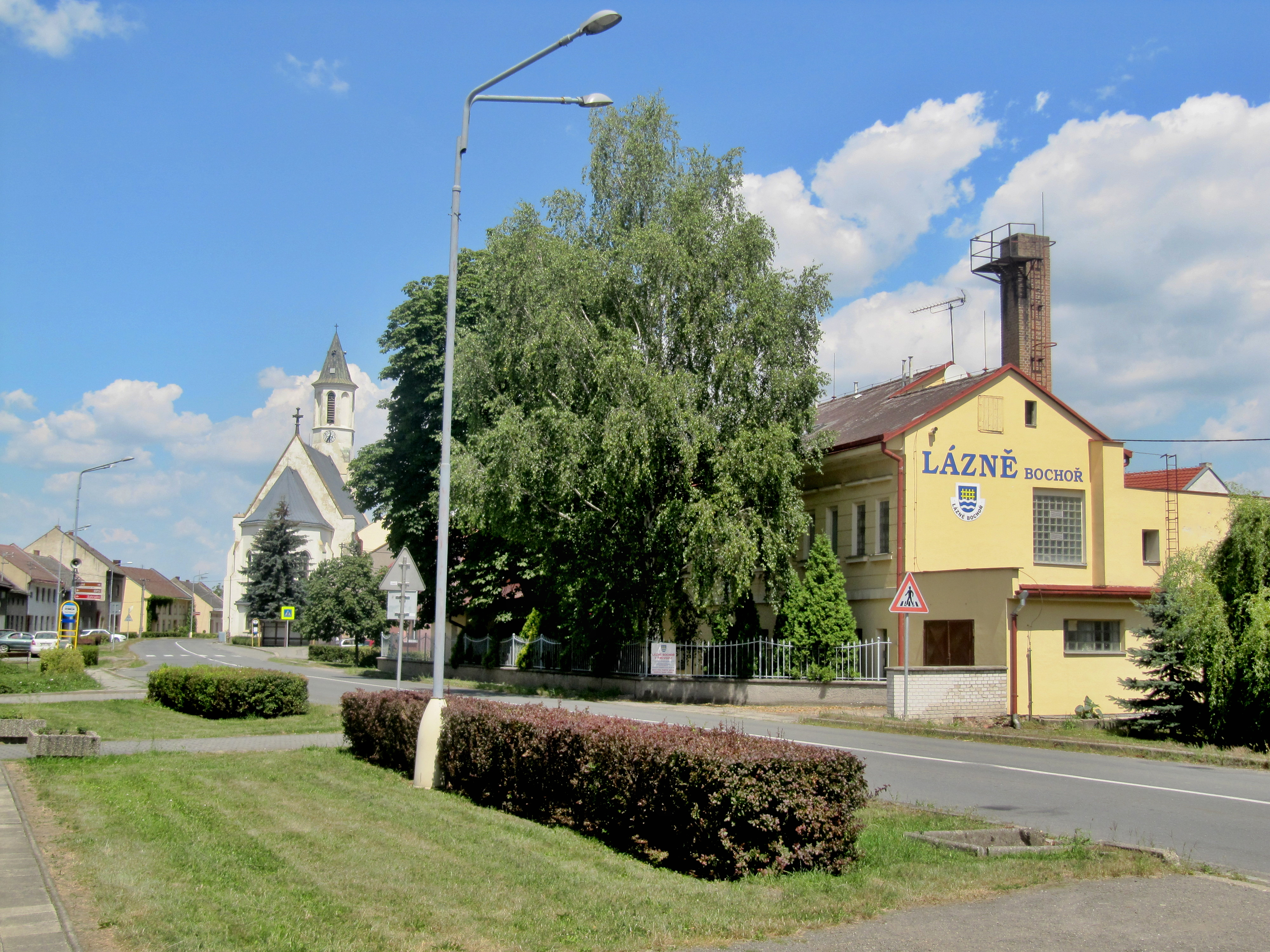
- Bochoř spa and Church of Saint Florian

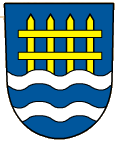
- Flag Coat of arms

- Location in the Czech Republic
- Coordinates: 49°25′17″N 17°25′42″E
- Country: Czech Republic
- Region: Olomouc
- District: Přerov
- First mentioned: 1294

Area
  - Total: 9.44 km^{2} (3.64 sq mi)
- Elevation: 204 m (669 ft)

Population (2026-01-01)
  - Total: 962
  - Density: 102/km^{2} (264/sq mi)
- Time zone: UTC+1 (CET)
  - Summer (DST): UTC+2 (CEST)
- Postal code: 751 08
- Website: www.bochor.cz

Bochoř is a municipality and village in Přerov District in the Olomouc Region of the Czech Republic. It has about 1,000 inhabitants.

Bochoř lies approximately 5 kilometres (3 mi) south-west of Přerov, 24 km (15 mi) south-east of Olomouc, and 229 km (142 mi) east of Prague.

== Demographics ==
Historical population
Year	Pop.	±%
1869	613	—
1880	762	+24.3%
1890	845	+10.9%
1900	1,018	+20.5%
1910	1,392	+36.7%
1921	1,646	+18.2%
1930	1,662	+1.0%
1950	1,375	−17.3%
1961	1,416	+3.0%
1970	1,215	−14.2%
1980	1,053	−13.3%
1991	880	−16.4%
2001	945	+7.4%
2011	977	+3.4%
2021	927	−5.1%
Source: Censuses

== Economy ==
In Bochoř is a small spa. The spa is one of the oldest in Moravia as it was first mentioned in 1580. Since 2010, it has been a property of the Bochoř municipality. The spa specialises in treating musculoskeletal disorders and rheumatic diseases.
