= Podolí (Přerov District) =

- Municipality
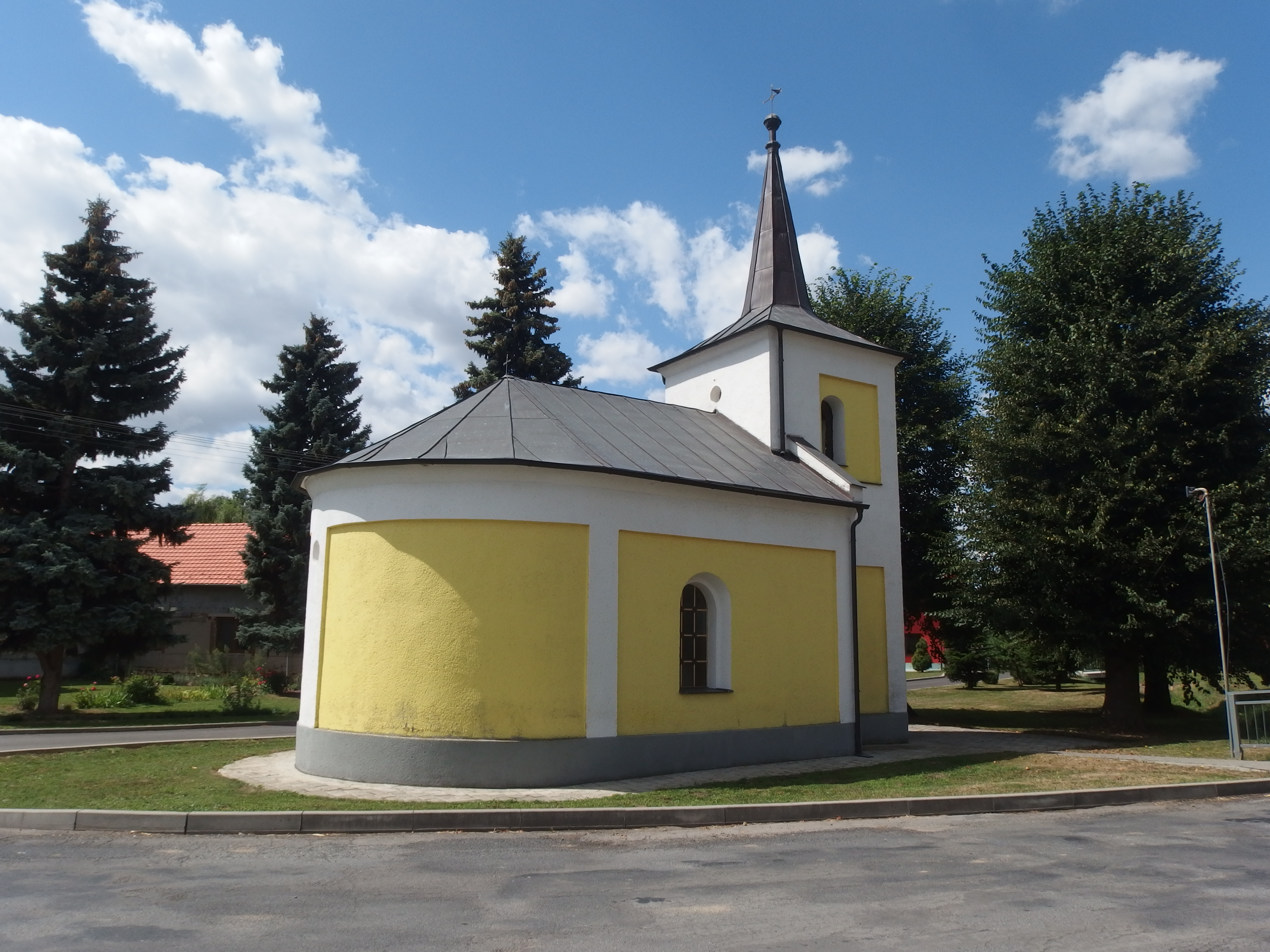
- Chapel of Saints Cyril and Methodius

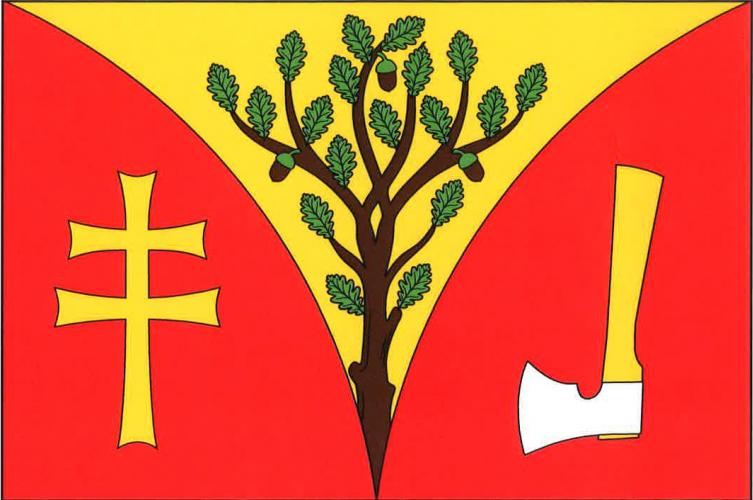
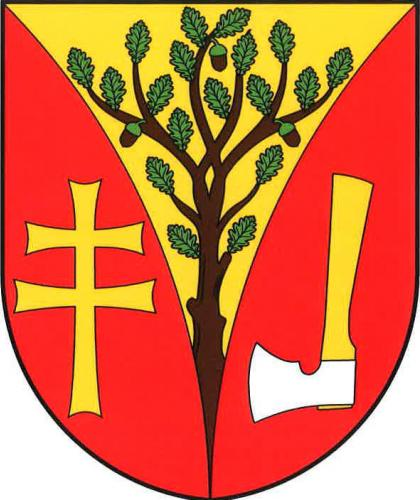
- Flag Coat of arms

- Location in the Czech Republic
- Coordinates: 49°26′43″N 17°31′49″E
- Country: Czech Republic
- Region: Olomouc
- District: Přerov
- First mentioned: 1349

Area
  - Total: 2.16 km^{2} (0.83 sq mi)
- Elevation: 262 m (860 ft)

Population (2026-01-01)
  - Total: 198
  - Density: 91.7/km^{2} (237/sq mi)
- Time zone: UTC+1 (CET)
  - Summer (DST): UTC+2 (CEST)
- Postal code: 751 16
- Website: www.podoliobec.eu

Podolí is a municipality and village in Přerov District in the Olomouc Region of the Czech Republic. It has about 200 inhabitants.

Podolí lies approximately 6 kilometres (4 mi) east of Přerov, 27 km (17 mi) south-east of Olomouc, and 235 km (146 mi) east of Prague.

== Demographics ==
Historical population
Year	Pop.	±%
1869	146	—
1880	164	+12.3%
1890	171	+4.3%
1900	186	+8.8%
1910	253	+36.0%
1921	253	+0.0%
1930	253	+0.0%
1950	212	−16.2%
1961	228	+7.5%
1970	230	+0.9%
1980	224	−2.6%
1991	171	−23.7%
2001	197	+15.2%
2011	214	+8.6%
2021	189	−11.7%
Source: Censuses
