= Štarnov =

- Municipality
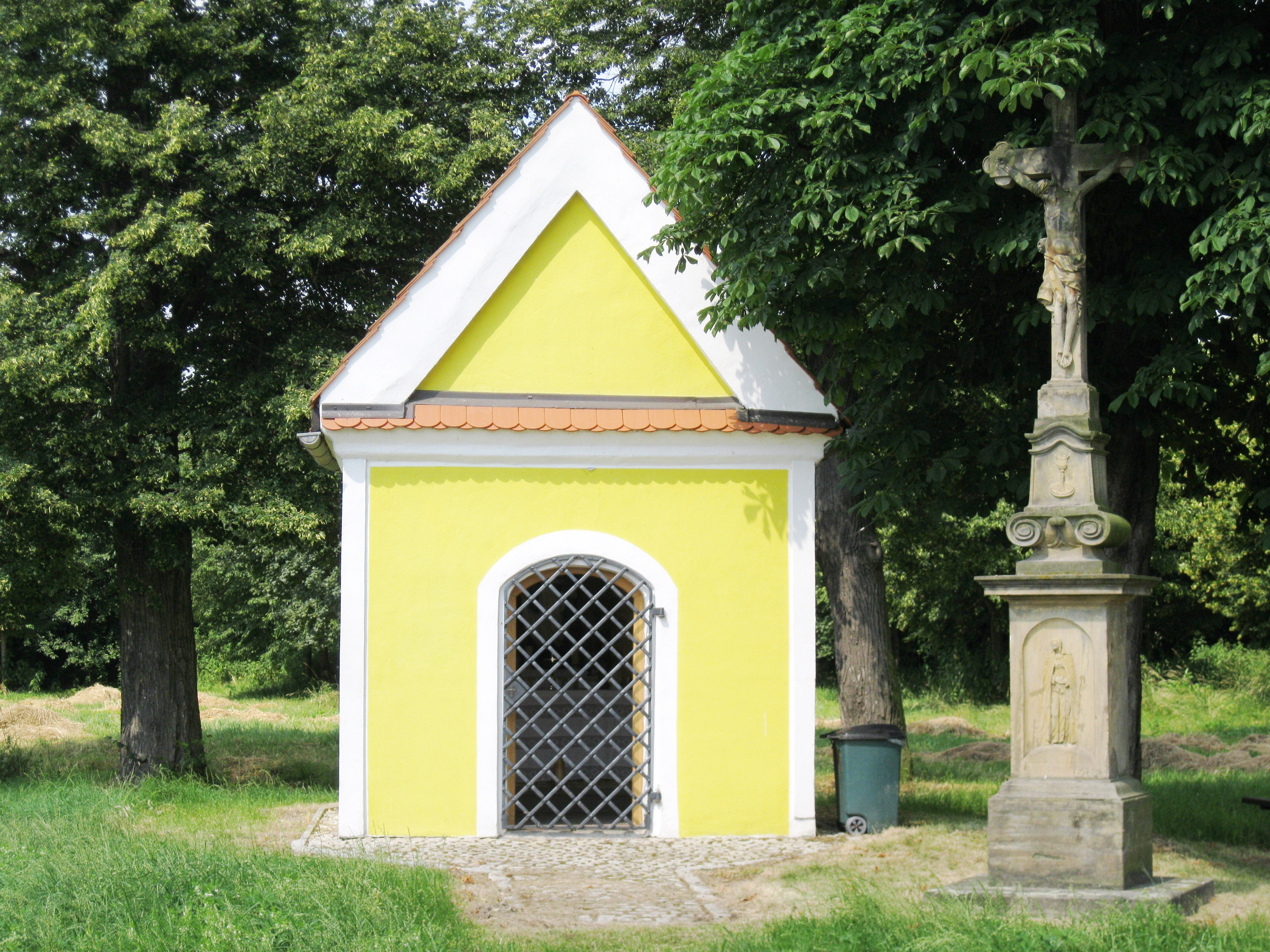
- Chapel of Our Lady of Sorrows

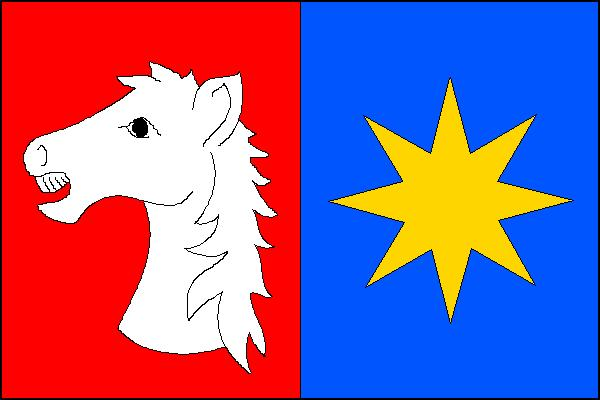
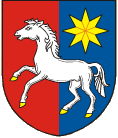
- Flag Coat of arms

- Location in the Czech Republic
- Coordinates: 49°41′10″N 17°16′21″E
- Country: Czech Republic
- Region: Olomouc
- District: Olomouc
- First mentioned: 1269

Area
  - Total: 9.88 km^{2} (3.81 sq mi)
- Elevation: 224 m (735 ft)

Population (2026-01-01)
  - Total: 862
  - Density: 87.2/km^{2} (226/sq mi)
- Time zone: UTC+1 (CET)
  - Summer (DST): UTC+2 (CEST)
- Postal code: 783 14
- Website: www.starnov.cz

Štarnov (German: Starnau) is a municipality and village in Olomouc District in the Olomouc Region of the Czech Republic. It has about 900 inhabitants.

Štarnov lies approximately 10 kilometres (6 mi) north of Olomouc and 210 km (130 mi) east of Prague.

== Demographics ==
Historical population
Year	Pop.	±%
1869	573	—
1880	582	+1.6%
1890	638	+9.6%
1900	614	−3.8%
1910	610	−0.7%
1921	645	+5.7%
1930	749	+16.1%
1950	625	−16.6%
1961	679	+8.6%
1970	605	−10.9%
1980	603	−0.3%
1991	556	−7.8%
2001	577	+3.8%
2011	677	+17.3%
2021	824	+21.7%
Source: Censuses
