= Sobíšky =

- Municipality
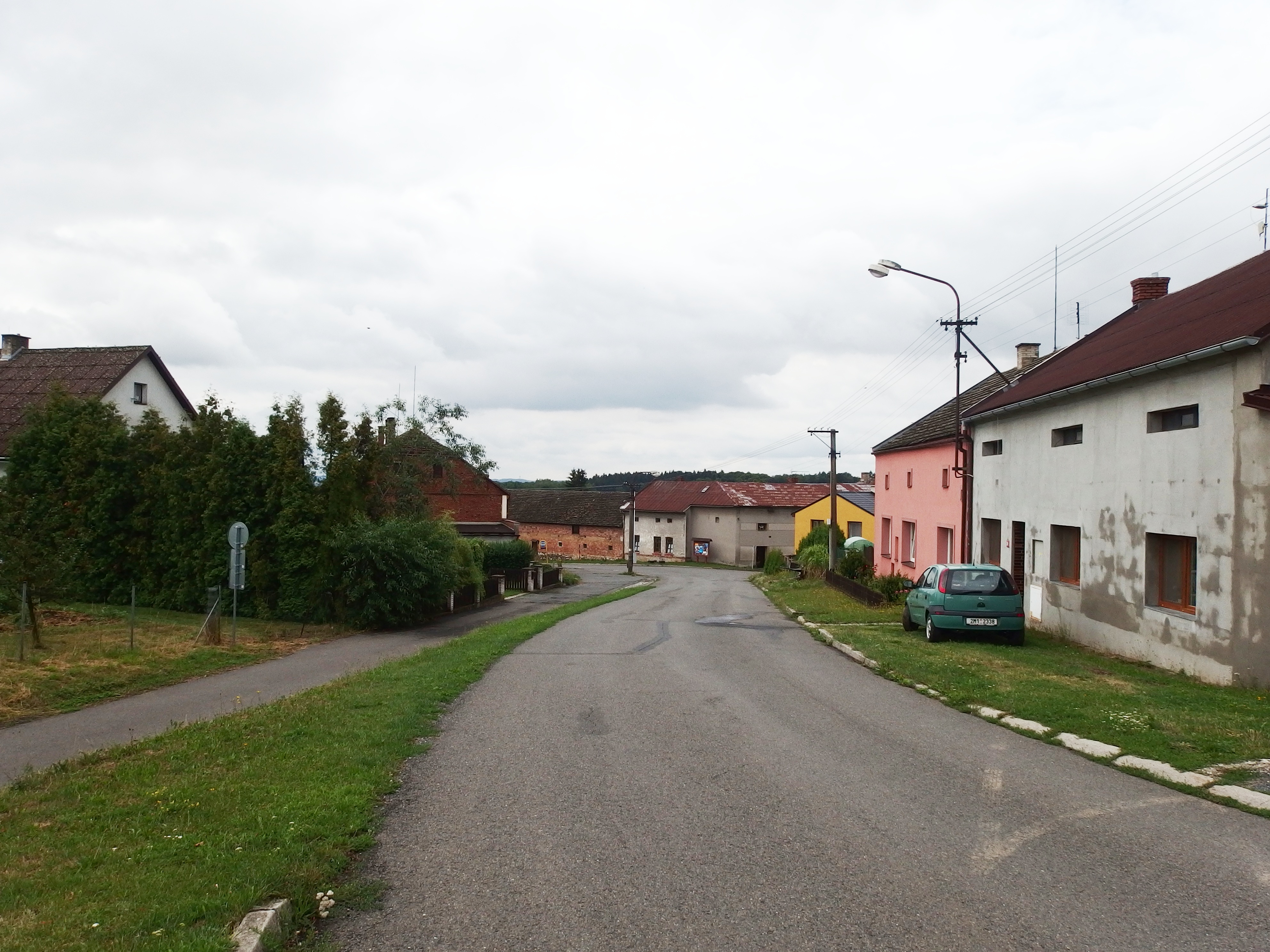
- Centre of Sobíšky

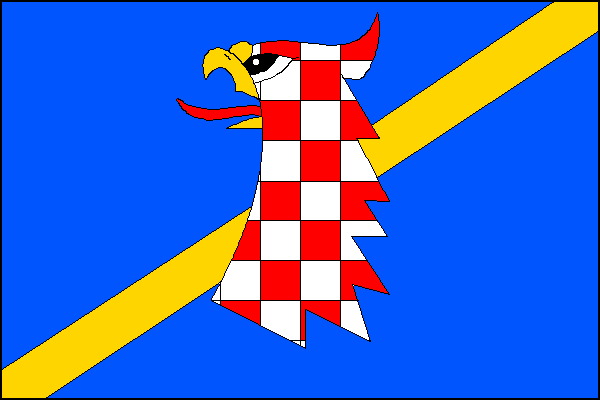
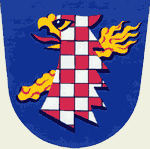
- Flag Coat of arms

- Location in the Czech Republic
- Coordinates: 49°30′14″N 17°27′3″E
- Country: Czech Republic
- Region: Olomouc
- District: Přerov
- First mentioned: 1275

Area
  - Total: 2.91 km^{2} (1.12 sq mi)
- Elevation: 300 m (980 ft)

Population (2026-01-01)
  - Total: 155
  - Density: 53.3/km^{2} (138/sq mi)
- Time zone: UTC+1 (CET)
  - Summer (DST): UTC+2 (CEST)
- Postal code: 751 21
- Website: www.sobisky.cz

Sobíšky is a municipality and village in Přerov District in the Olomouc Region of the Czech Republic. It has about 200 inhabitants.

Sobíšky lies approximately 6 kilometres (4 mi) north of Přerov, 17 km (11 mi) south-east of Olomouc, and 227 km (141 mi) east of Prague.

== Demographics ==
Historical population
| Year | Pop. | ±% |
|---|---|---|
| 1869 | 149 | — |
| 1880 | 156 | +4.7% |
| 1890 | 211 | +35.3% |
| 1900 | 198 | −6.2% |
| 1910 | 195 | −1.5% |
| 1921 | 184 | −5.6% |
| 1930 | 263 | +42.9% |
| 1950 | 182 | −30.8% |
| 1961 | 220 | +20.9% |
| 1970 | 187 | −15.0% |
| 1980 | 169 | −9.6% |
| 1991 | 139 | −17.8% |
| 2001 | 151 | +8.6% |
| 2011 | 152 | +0.7% |
| 2021 | 155 | +2.0% |
Source: Censuses
