= Šišma =

- Municipality
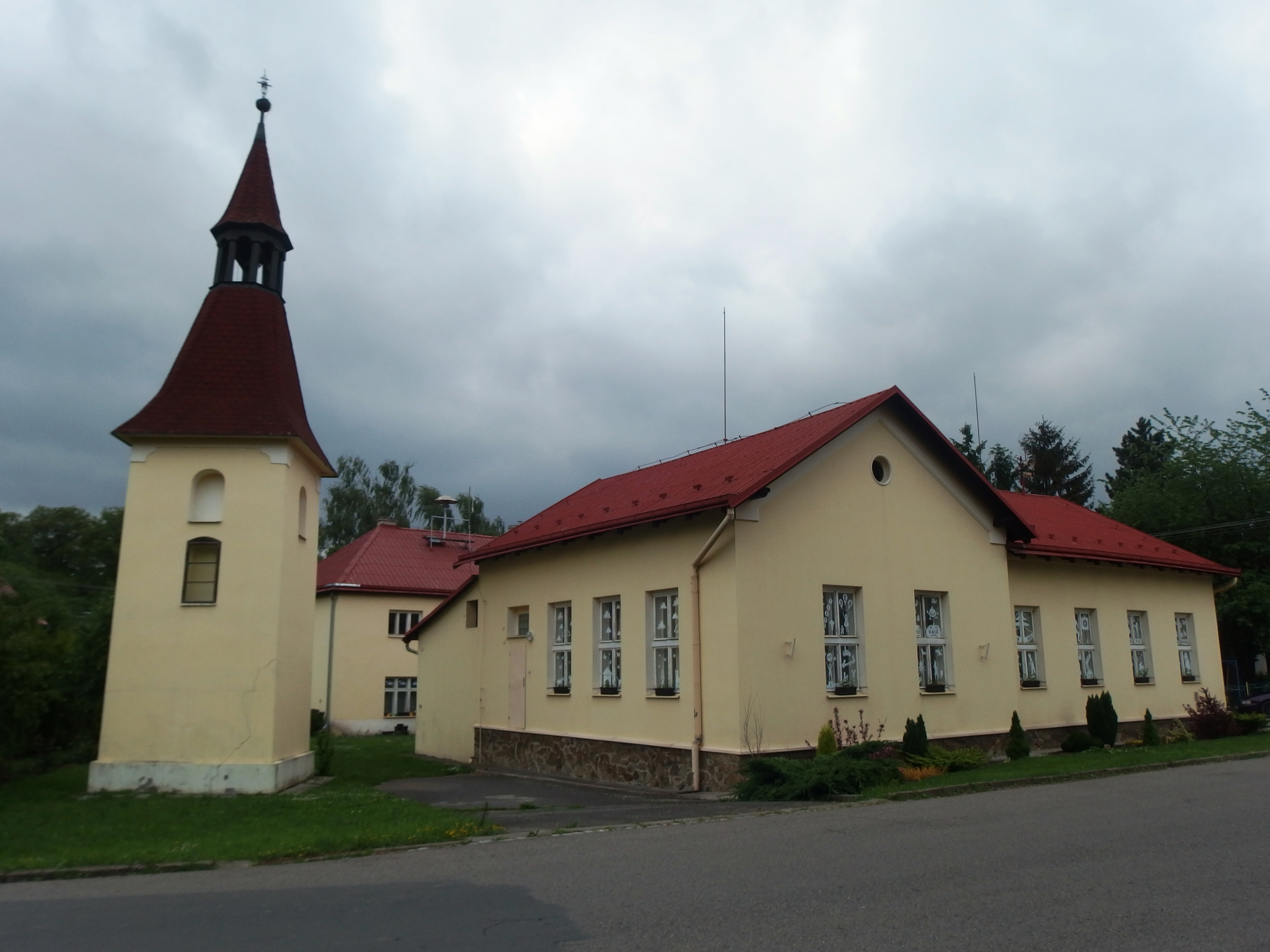
- Belfry and the municipal office

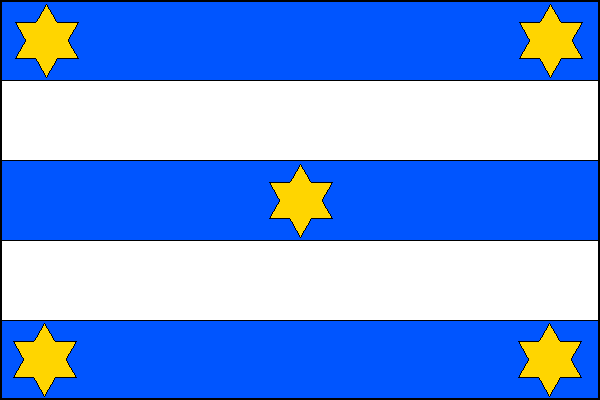
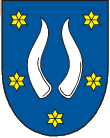
- Flag Coat of arms

- Location in the Czech Republic
- Coordinates: 49°27′50″N 17°35′17″E
- Country: Czech Republic
- Region: Olomouc
- District: Přerov
- First mentioned: 1348

Area
  - Total: 4.36 km^{2} (1.68 sq mi)
- Elevation: 260 m (850 ft)

Population (2026-01-01)
  - Total: 210
  - Density: 48/km^{2} (120/sq mi)
- Time zone: UTC+1 (CET)
  - Summer (DST): UTC+2 (CEST)
- Postal code: 751 11
- Website: www.sisma.cz

Šišma is a municipality and village in Přerov District in the Olomouc Region of the Czech Republic. It has about 200 inhabitants.

Šišma lies approximately 10 kilometres (6 mi) east of Přerov, 28 km (17 mi) south-east of Olomouc, and 238 km (148 mi) east of Prague.

== Demographics ==
Historical population
Year	Pop.	±%
1869	308	—
1880	327	+6.2%
1890	319	−2.4%
1900	347	+8.8%
1910	353	+1.7%
1921	357	+1.1%
1930	338	−5.3%
1950	337	−0.3%
1961	339	+0.6%
1970	291	−14.2%
1980	278	−4.5%
1991	217	−21.9%
2001	204	−6.0%
2011	199	−2.5%
2021	207	+4.0%
Source: Censuses
