= Grygov =

- Municipality
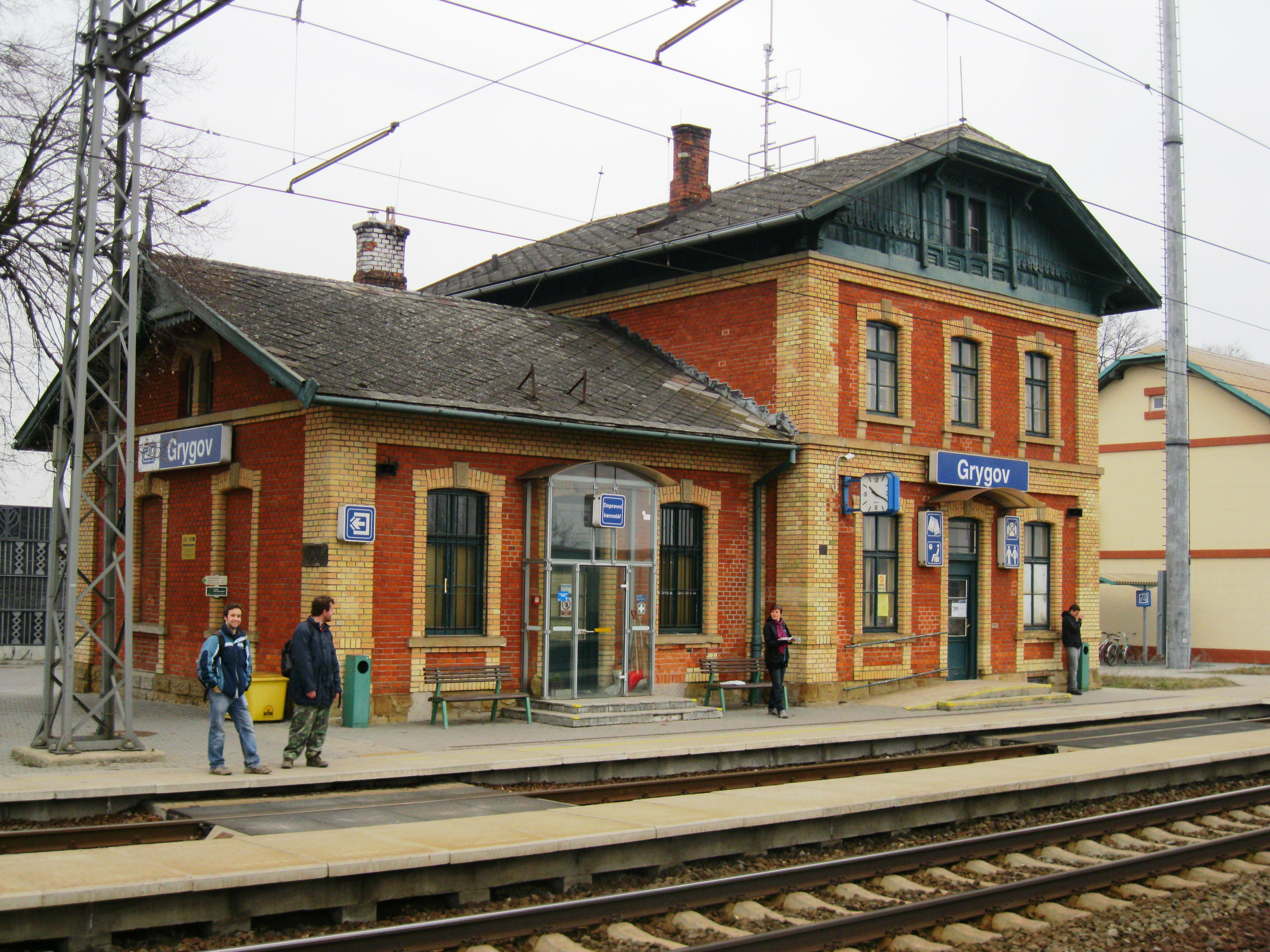
- Train station

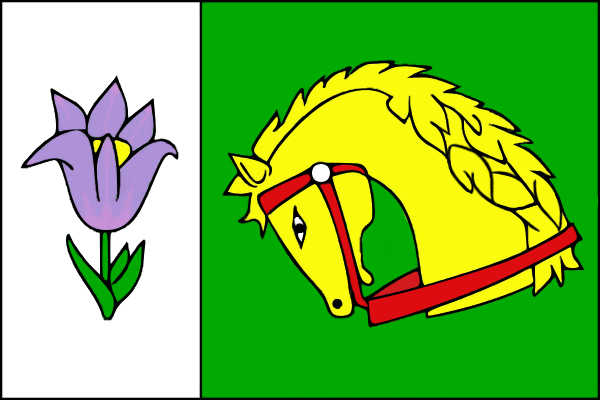
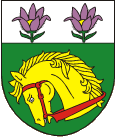
- Flag Coat of arms

- Location in the Czech Republic
- Coordinates: 49°32′16″N 17°18′39″E
- Country: Czech Republic
- Region: Olomouc
- District: Olomouc
- First mentioned: 1306

Area
  - Total: 12.72 km^{2} (4.91 sq mi)
- Elevation: 206 m (676 ft)

Population (2026-01-01)
  - Total: 1,532
  - Density: 120.4/km^{2} (311.9/sq mi)
- Time zone: UTC+1 (CET)
  - Summer (DST): UTC+2 (CEST)
- Postal code: 783 73
- Website: www.grygov.cz

Grygov is a municipality and village in Olomouc District in the Olomouc Region of the Czech Republic. It has about 1,500 inhabitants.

== Etymology ==
The name is derived from the German word kriegaw, which meant 'floodplain dispute'. It refers to a legal dispute over land ownership that took place in the mid-14th century.

== Geography ==
Grygov is located about 6 kilometres (4 mi) south of Olomouc. It lies mostly in the Upper Morava Valley, only the eastern part of the municipality extends into the Nízký Jeseník range. The highest point is the Horka hill at 253 m (830 ft) above sea level.

Near Grygov is the riparian forest Království, protected as a nature reserve. It contains an oak-tree called Král ('king'), which is about 400 years old.

== History ==
The first written mention of Grygov is from 1306, when King Wenceslaus III donated the area to the city of Olomouc. From the 16th century, the village was known for lime production.

== Demographics ==
Historical population

Year	Pop.	±%
1869	478	—
1880	606	+26.8%
1890	696	+14.9%
1900	758	+8.9%
1910	859	+13.3%

Year	Pop.	±%
1921	954	+11.1%
1930	1,148	+20.3%
1950	1,174	+2.3%
1961	1,343	+14.4%
1970	1,292	−3.8%

Year	Pop.	±%
1980	1,539	+19.1%
1991	1,447	−6.0%
2001	1,387	−4.1%
2011	1,408	+1.5%
2021	1,473	+4.6%

Source: Censuses

== Transport ==
Grygov is located on the railway lines Olomouc–Přerov and Uničov–Nezamyslice.

== Sights ==
The only protected cultural monuments in the municipality are a set of statues of St. Wenceslaus and St. Catherine from the mid-18th century and a valuable train station building from the 1890s.

== Notable people ==
- Jan Šrámek (1870–1956), politician, Prime Minister and Roman Catholic Monsignore
