= Vranovice-Kelčice =

- Municipality
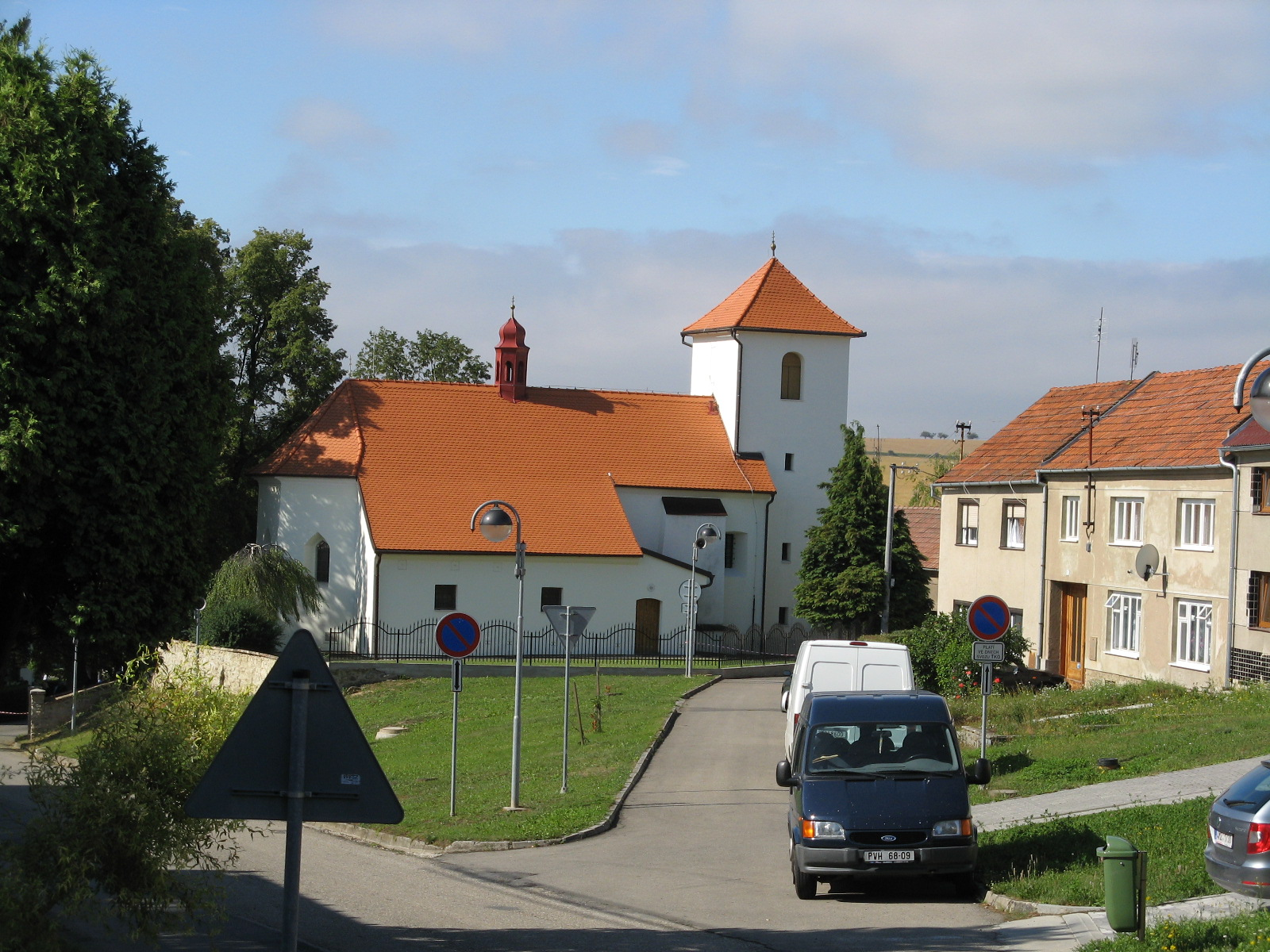
- Church of Saint Cunigunde

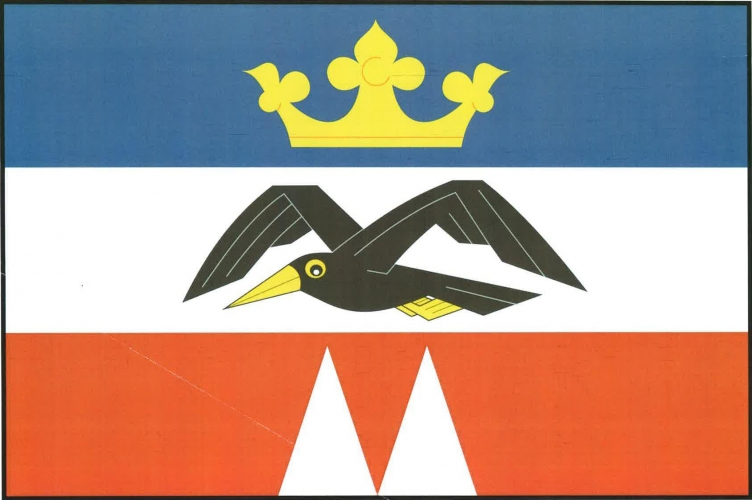
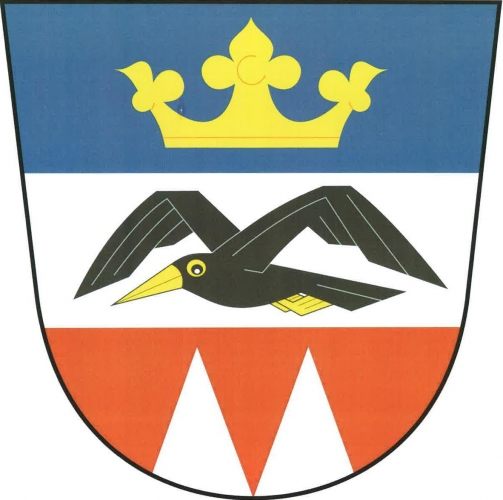
- Flag Coat of arms

- Location in the Czech Republic
- Coordinates: 49°24′13″N 17°6′1″E
- Country: Czech Republic
- Region: Olomouc
- District: Prostějov
- First mentioned: 1258

Area
  - Total: 7.87 km^{2} (3.04 sq mi)
- Elevation: 233 m (764 ft)

Population (2026-01-01)
  - Total: 611
  - Density: 77.6/km^{2} (201/sq mi)
- Time zone: UTC+1 (CET)
  - Summer (DST): UTC+2 (CEST)
- Postal code: 798 08
- Website: www.vranovicekelcice.cz

Vranovice-Kelčice is a municipality in Prostějov District in the Olomouc Region of the Czech Republic. It has about 600 inhabitants.

Vranovice-Kelčice lies approximately 9 kilometres (6 mi) south of Prostějov, 25 km (16 mi) south-west of Olomouc, and 208 km (129 mi) east of Prague.

== Administrative division ==
Vranovice-Kelčice consists of two municipal parts (in brackets population according to the 2021 census):

- Vranovice (246)
- Kelčice (327)

== History ==
The first written mention of Kelčice is from 1258. The first written mention of Vranovice is from 1337. The two formerly separate municipalities merged in 1964.

== Demographics ==
Historical population
Year	Pop.	±%
1869	698	—
1880	769	+10.2%
1890	732	−4.8%
1900	720	−1.6%
1910	802	+11.4%
1921	780	−2.7%
1930	771	−1.2%
1950	685	−11.2%
1961	644	−6.0%
1970	604	−6.2%
1980	591	−2.2%
1991	553	−6.4%
2001	593	+7.2%
2011	596	+0.5%
2021	573	−3.9%
Source: Censuses
