= Blata (river) =

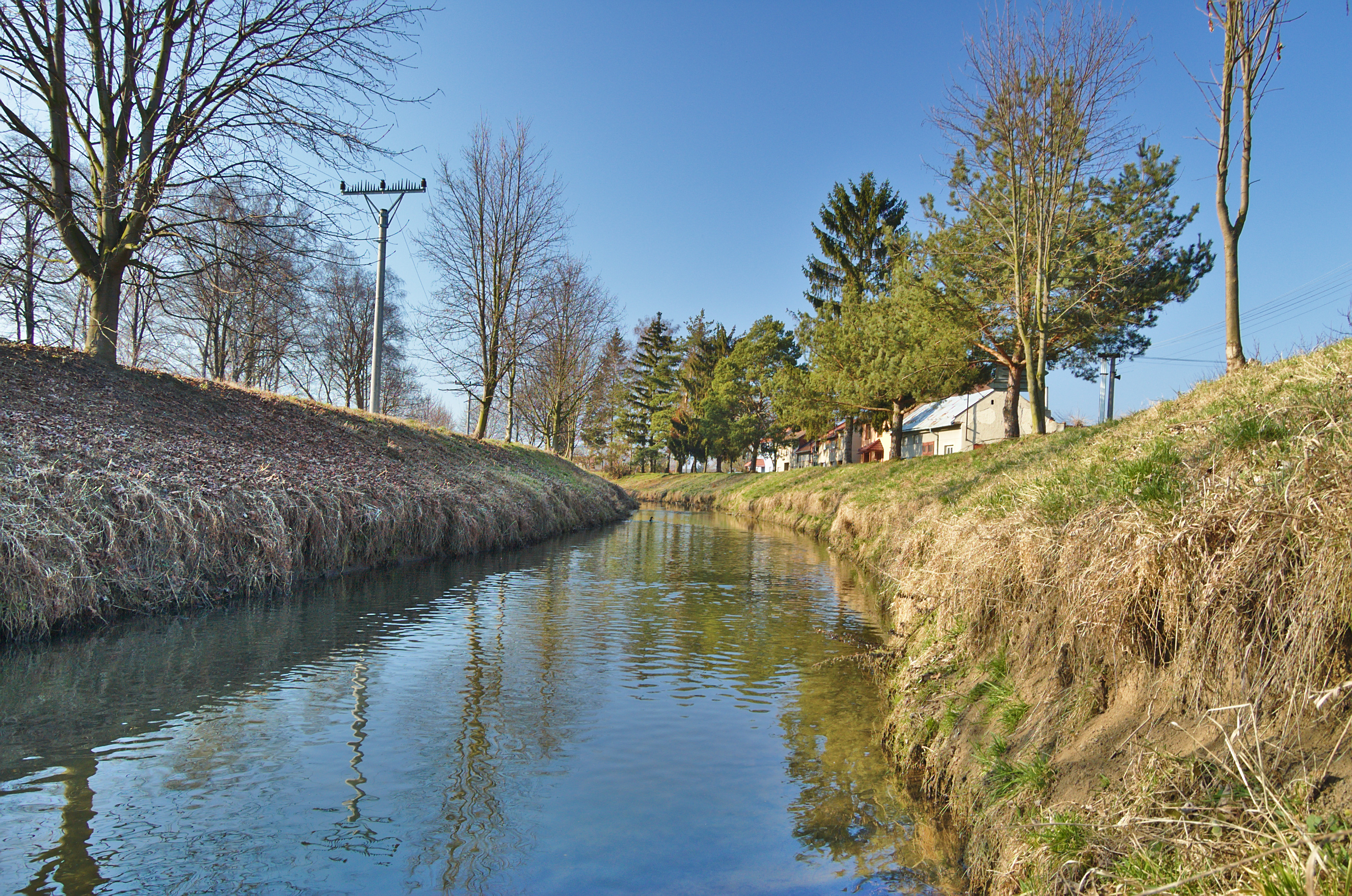
- The Blata in Bystročice

Location
- Country: Czech Republic
- Region: Olomouc

Physical characteristics
- Source
  - location: Vilémov, Zábřeh Highlands
  - coordinates: 49°38′48″N 16°59′14″E
  - elevation: 424 m (1,391 ft)
- Mouth
  - location: Morava
  - coordinates: 49°23′45″N 17°18′20″E
  - elevation: 194 m (636 ft)
- Length: 45.3 km (28.1 mi)
- Basin size: 313.1 km^{2} (120.9 sq mi)
- Discharge
  - average: 0.40 m^{3}/s (14 cu ft/s) in Klopotovice

Basin features
- Progression: Morava→ Danube→ Black Sea

The Blata is a river in the Czech Republic, a right tributary of the Morava River. It flows through the Olomouc Region. It is 45.3 km (28.1 mi) long.

== Characteristic ==
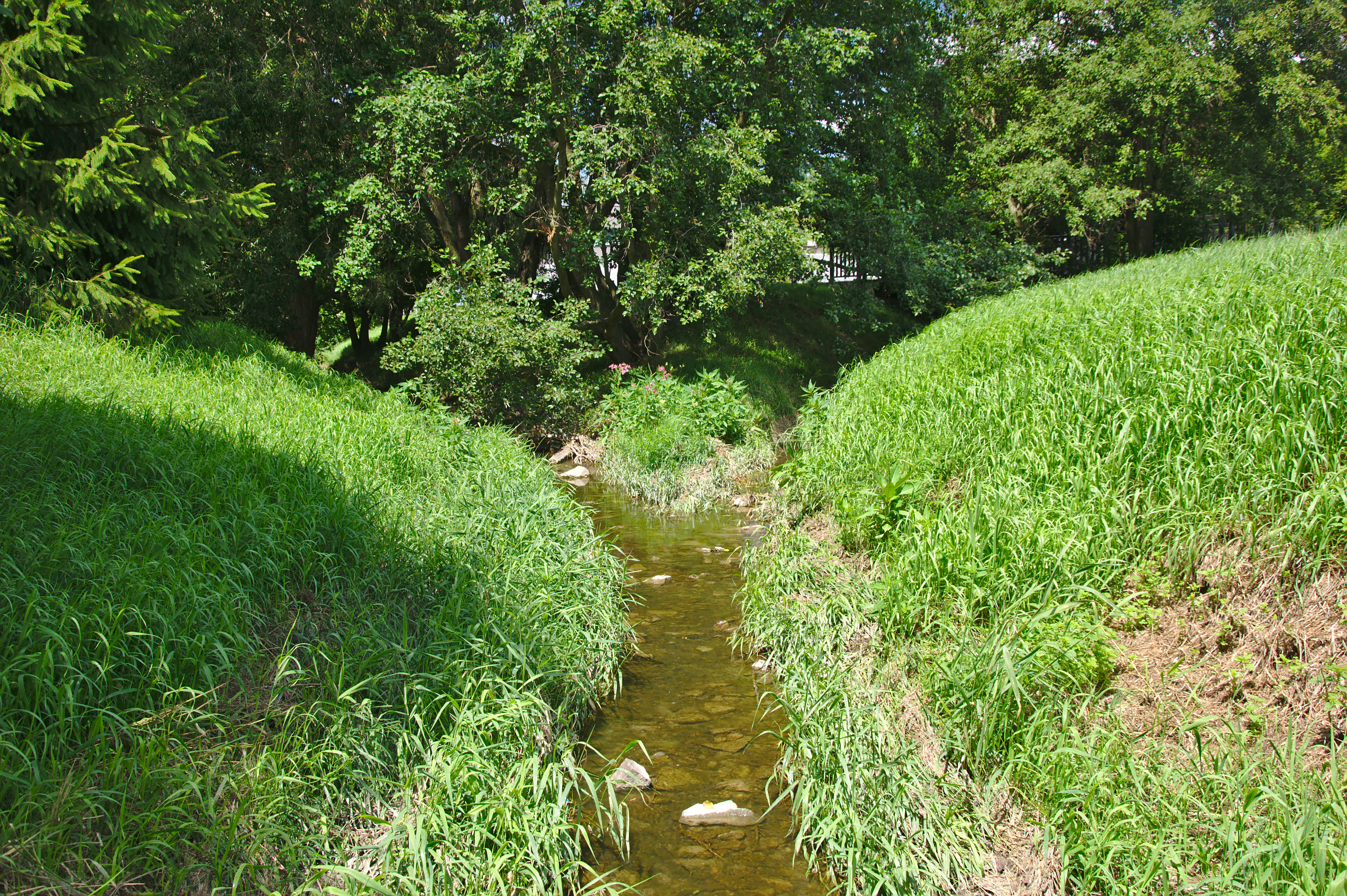
Confluence of the Blata (right) and Šumice

The Blata originates in the territory of Vilémov in the Zábřeh Highlands at an elevation of 424 m (1,391 ft) and flows to Lobodice, where it enters the Morava River at an elevation of 194 m (636 ft). It is 45.3 km (28.1 mi) long. Its drainage basin has an area of 313.1 km^{2} (120.9 sq mi). The average discharge at 8.1 river km in Klopotovice is 0.40 m^{3}/s (14 cu ft/s).

The longest tributaries of the Blata are:

Tributary	Length (km)	Side
Šumice	24.8	right
Dubčanka	12.1	left
Zlatá stružka	8.4	right

In addition to its tributaries, the Blata also receives water from the Morava River through the Mlýnský náhon canal (also called Boleloucký náhon and Boleloucký potok). It flows along the Morava River and merges with the Blata in Tovačov-Annín. It is 11.5 km (7.1 mi) long. In Lobodice, the Mlýnský náhon separates from the Blata River again and continues along the Morava River for a few more kilometres. The canal was built to power water mills, sawmills and one hydroelectric power plant.

== Course ==
The river flows through the municipal territories of Vilémov, Bílsko, Senička, Senice na Hané, Loučany, Těšetice, Ústín, Luběnice, Hněvotín, Olšany u Prostějova, Bystročice, Vrbátky, Blatec, Dub nad Moravou, Hrdibořice, Biskupice, Věrovany, Klopotovice, Tovačov and Lobodice.

== Bodies of water ==
There are 100 bodies of water in the basin area. The largest of them is the artificially created lake Skašovské jezero with an area of 119 ha (290 acres), located near the mouth of the river. The Vilémov Reservoir is a small reservoir, built on the upper course of the Blata.

== Fauna ==
The diversity of animals in the river was reduced by an ecological disaster in 2012. Among the species of fish whose populations have been restored and which commonly live in the river today are the common chub, stone loach and gudgeon.

== See also ==
- List of rivers of the Czech Republic
