= Olomouc (administrative district) =

Administrative division of the Czech Republic

Administrative district of the municipality with extended powers of Olomouc Správní obvod obce s rozšířenou působností Olomouc
- Administrative district of municipality with extended powers
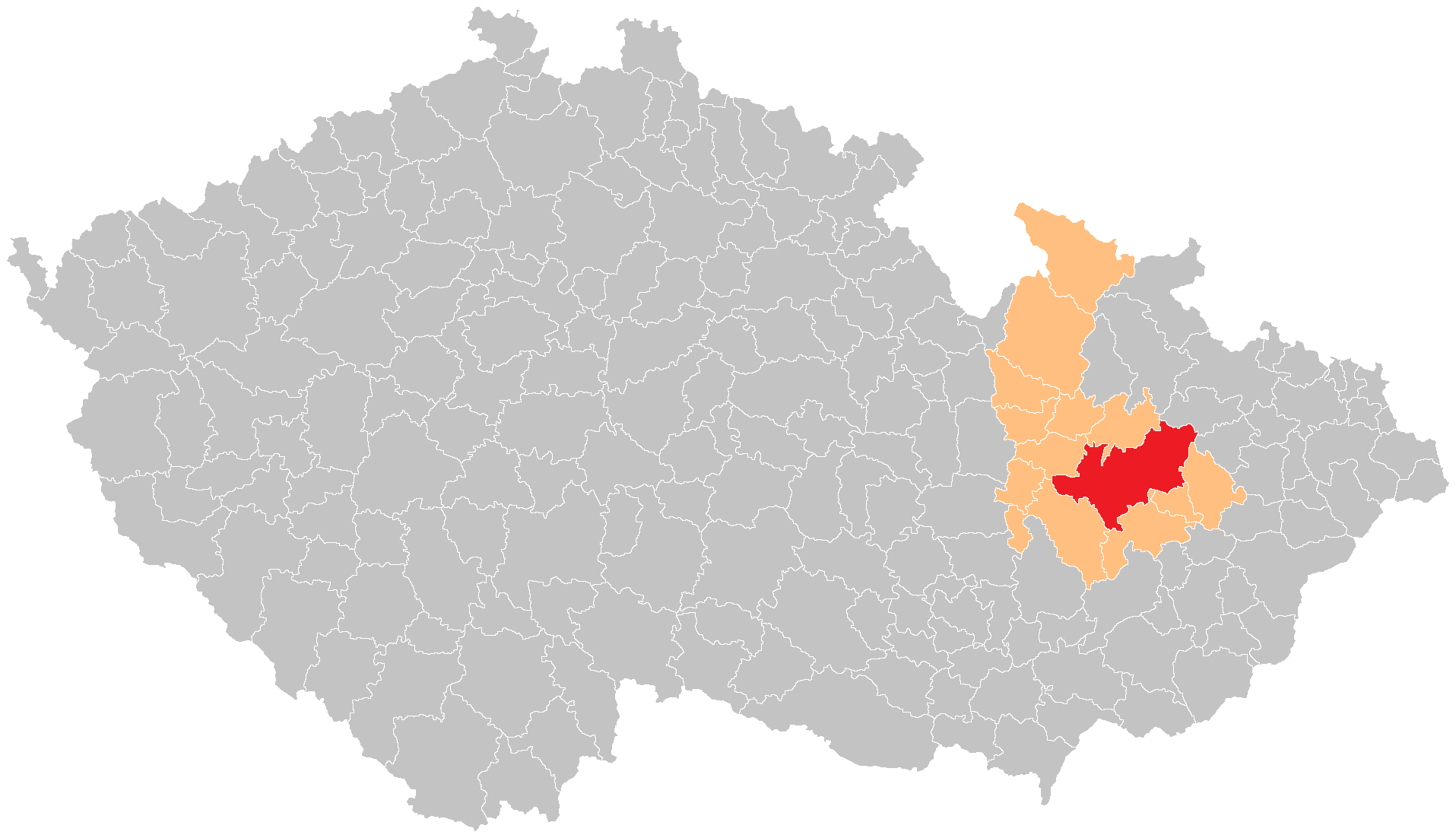
- Location in the Olomouc Region within the Czech Republic
- Coordinates: 49°36′N 17°18′E
- Country: Czech Republic
- Region: Olomouc
- District: Olomouc
- Municipality with extended powers: Olomouc

Area
  - Total: 816.97 km^{2} (315.43 sq mi)

Population (2024)
  - Total: 168,674
  - Density: 206.46/km^{2} (534.74/sq mi)
- Time zone: UTC+1 (CET)
  - Summer (DST): UTC+2 (CEST)
- Municipalities: 45
- * Cities and towns: 3
- * Market towns: 3

The administrative district of the municipality with extended powers of Olomouc (abbreviated AD MEP Olomouc; Czech: Správní obvod obce s rozšířenou působností Olomouc, SO ORP Olomouc) is an administrative district of municipality with extended powers in Olomouc District in the Olomouc Region of the Czech Republic. It has existed since 1 January 2003, when the districts were replaced administratively. It includes 45 municipalities along with the Libavá Military Training Area which have a combined population of about 169,000.

== Municipalities ==
Cities and towns are in bold, and market towns are in italics.

Municipality	Population	Area (km^{2)}	Density
Bělkovice-Lašťany	2,270	15.30	148
Blatec	658	6.58	100
Bohuňovice	2,531	12.57	201
Bukovany	707	3.16	223
Bystročice	895	8.01	111
Bystrovany	1,002	3.51	285
Daskabát	620	5.83	106
Dolany	2,942	23.77	123
Doloplazy	1,340	8.04	166
Drahanovice	1,845	13.53	136
Dub nad Moravou	1,629	15.23	106
Grygov	1,519	12.72	119
Hlubočky	4,202	22.31	188
Hlušovice	1,095	4.25	257
Hněvotín	1,920	11.73	163
Horka nad Moravou	2,685	11.93	225
Charváty	945	8.88	106
Kozlov	272	45.76	5.9
Kožušany-Tážaly	880	6.27	140
Krčmaň	501	4.98	100
Křelov-Břuchotín	1,954	7.91	247
Libavá	0	235.49	0
Liboš	619	4.30	143
Loučany	621	4.98	124
Luběnice	500	2.76	181
Lutín	3,234	8.20	394
Majetín	1,184	9.50	124
Mrsklesy	699	5.55	125
Náměšť na Hané	2,202	18.65	118
**Olomouc**	102,293	103.33	989
Přáslavice	1,489	7.28	204
Příkazy	1,337	13.98	96
Samotišky	1,359	1.90	715
Skrbeň	1,134	7.88	143
Slatinice	1,586	7.78	203
Suchonice	177	3.46	51
Svésedlice	303	3.03	100
**Štepánov**	3,531	26.84	131
Těšetice	1,346	12.48	107
Tovéř	657	2.06	318
Tršice	1,871	25.04	75
Ústín	436	4.40	99
**Velká Bystřice**	3,694	9.22	400
Velký Týnec	3,192	20.62	154
Velký Újezd	1,389	6.83	203
Věrovany	1,409	17.81	79

== Demographics ==
Historical population

Year	Pop.	±%
1869	81,109	—
1880	93,784	+15.6%
1890	101,059	+7.8%
1900	112,041	+10.9%
1910	121,959	+8.9%

Year	Pop.	±%
1921	128,251	+5.2%
1930	144,003	+12.3%
1950	125,977	−12.5%
1961	135,734	+7.7%
1970	143,284	+5.6%

Year	Pop.	±%
1980	154,842	+8.1%
1991	156,404	+1.0%
2001	157,852	+0.9%
2011	160,980	+2.0%
2021	169,377	+5.2%

Source: Censuses
