= Vilémov (Olomouc District) =

- Municipality
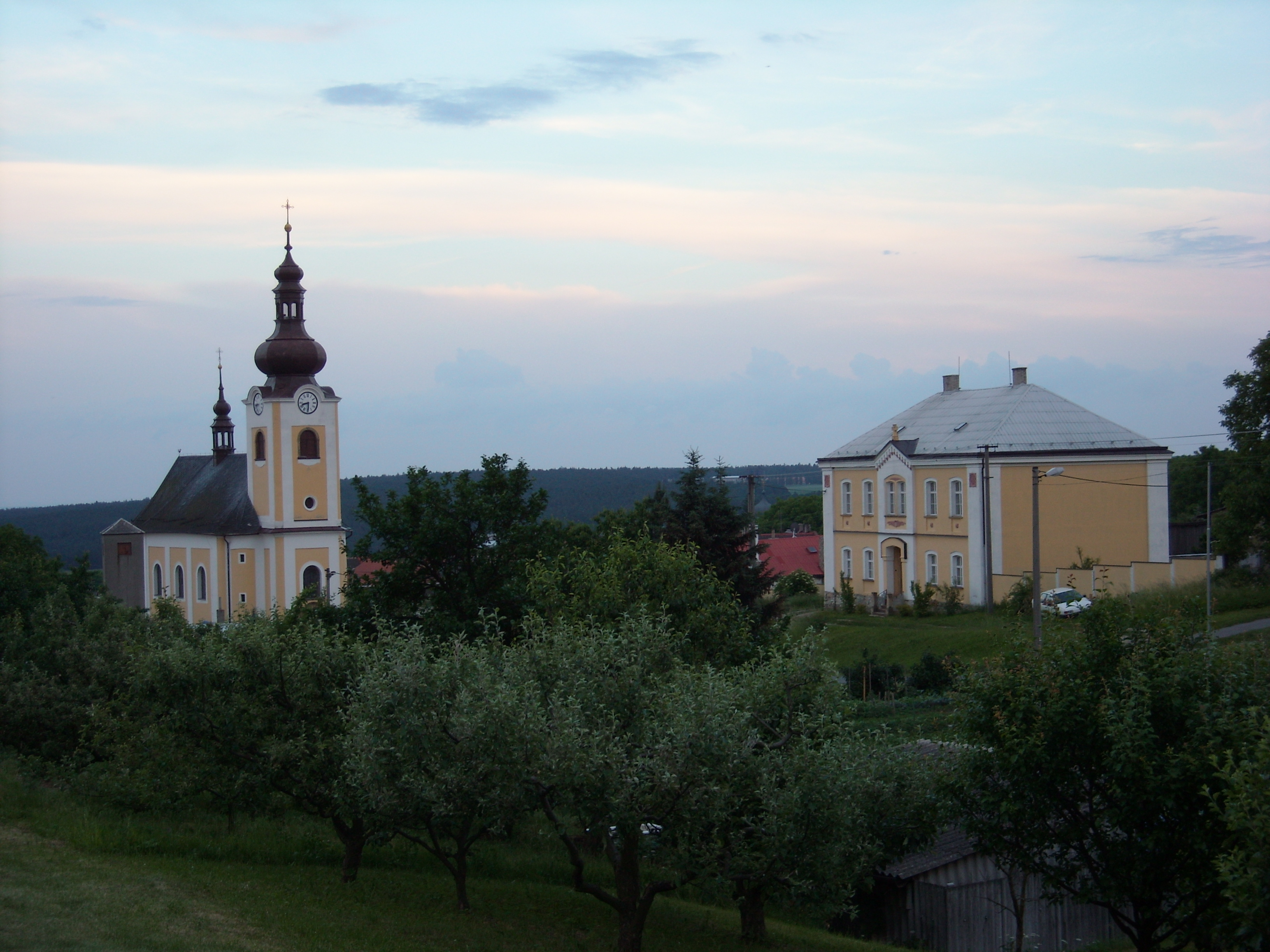
- Church of Saint Catherine and rectory

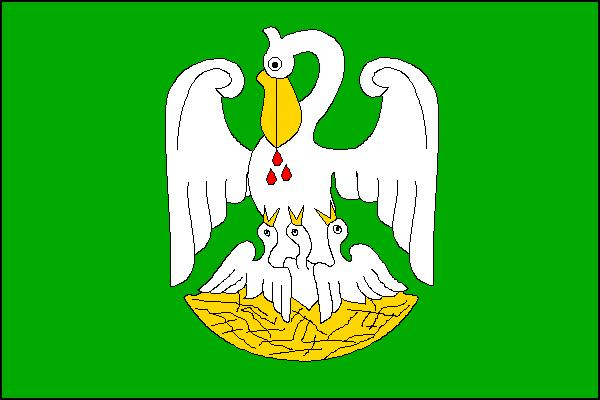
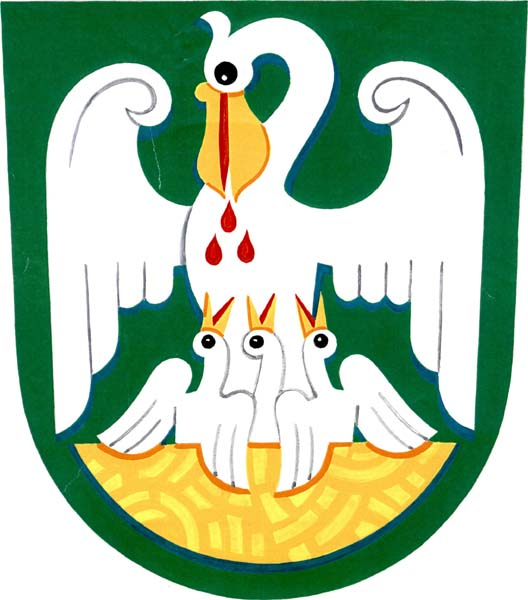
- Flag Coat of arms

- Location in the Czech Republic
- Coordinates: 49°38′8″N 16°59′43″E
- Country: Czech Republic
- Region: Olomouc
- District: Olomouc
- First mentioned: 1368

Area
  - Total: 8.54 km^{2} (3.30 sq mi)
- Elevation: 395 m (1,296 ft)

Population (2026-01-01)
  - Total: 436
  - Density: 51.1/km^{2} (132/sq mi)
- Time zone: UTC+1 (CET)
  - Summer (DST): UTC+2 (CEST)
- Postal code: 783 22
- Website: www.vilemov-ol.cz

Vilémov is a municipality and village in Olomouc District in the Olomouc Region of the Czech Republic. It has about 400 inhabitants.

Vilémov lies approximately 20 kilometres (12 mi) west of Olomouc and 191 km (119 mi) east of Prague. The Blata River originates in the municipality.

== Demographics ==
Historical population
Year	Pop.	±%
1869	750	—
1880	751	+0.1%
1890	735	−2.1%
1900	750	+2.0%
1910	750	+0.0%
1921	756	+0.8%
1930	706	−6.6%
1950	546	−22.7%
1961	542	−0.7%
1970	499	−7.9%
1980	492	−1.4%
1991	494	+0.4%
2001	483	−2.2%
2011	432	−10.6%
2021	418	−3.2%
Source: Censuses
