= Senice na Hané =

- Municipality
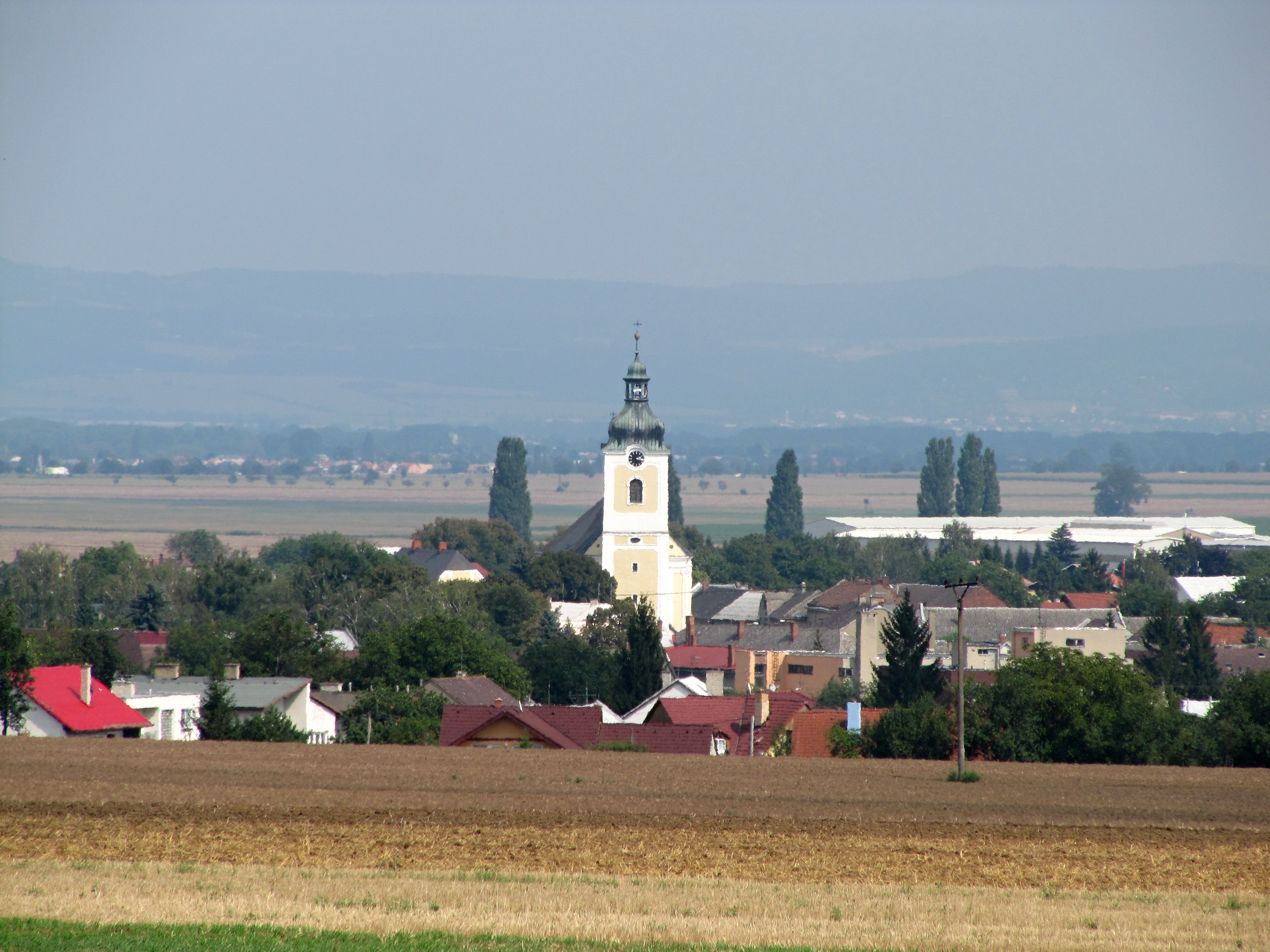
- View from the west

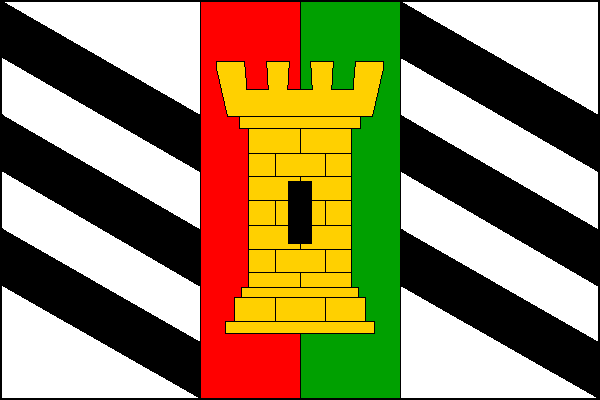
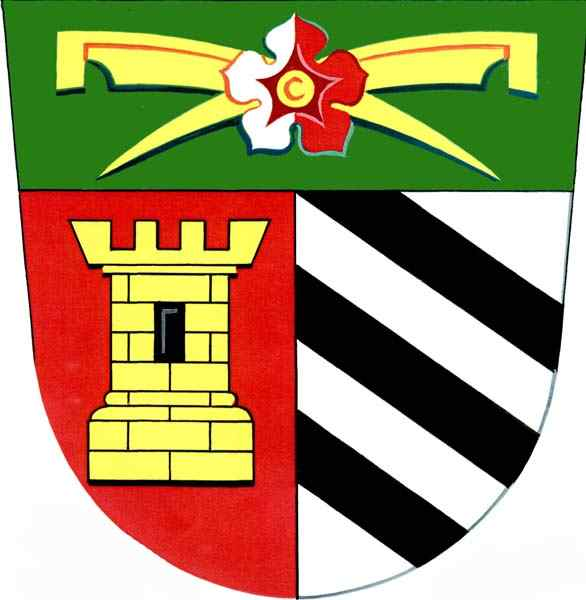
- Flag Coat of arms

- Location in the Czech Republic
- Coordinates: 49°37′26″N 17°5′9″E
- Country: Czech Republic
- Region: Olomouc
- District: Olomouc
- First mentioned: 1078

Area
  - Total: 19.26 km^{2} (7.44 sq mi)
- Elevation: 238 m (781 ft)

Population (2026-01-01)
  - Total: 1,760
  - Density: 91.4/km^{2} (237/sq mi)
- Time zone: UTC+1 (CET)
  - Summer (DST): UTC+2 (CEST)
- Postal code: 783 45
- Website: www.senicenahane.cz

Senice na Hané (German: Groß Senitz) is a municipality and village in Olomouc District in the Olomouc Region of the Czech Republic. It has about 1,800 inhabitants.

Senice na Hané lies approximately 13 kilometres (8 mi) west of Olomouc and 199 km (124 mi) east of Prague.

== Administrative division ==
Senice na Hané consists of three municipal parts (in brackets population according to the 2021 census):

- Senice na Hané (1,268)
- Cakov (228)
- Odrlice (211)

== Demographics ==
Historical population
Year	Pop.	±%
1869	1,649	—
1880	1,761	+6.8%
1890	1,912	+8.6%
1900	2,105	+10.1%
1910	2,146	+1.9%
1921	2,209	+2.9%
1930	2,236	+1.2%
1950	1,981	−11.4%
1961	2,008	+1.4%
1970	1,882	−6.3%
1980	1,854	−1.5%
1991	1,791	−3.4%
2001	1,814	+1.3%
2011	1,774	−2.2%
2021	1,707	−3.8%
Source: Censuses
