= Vrbátky =

- Municipality
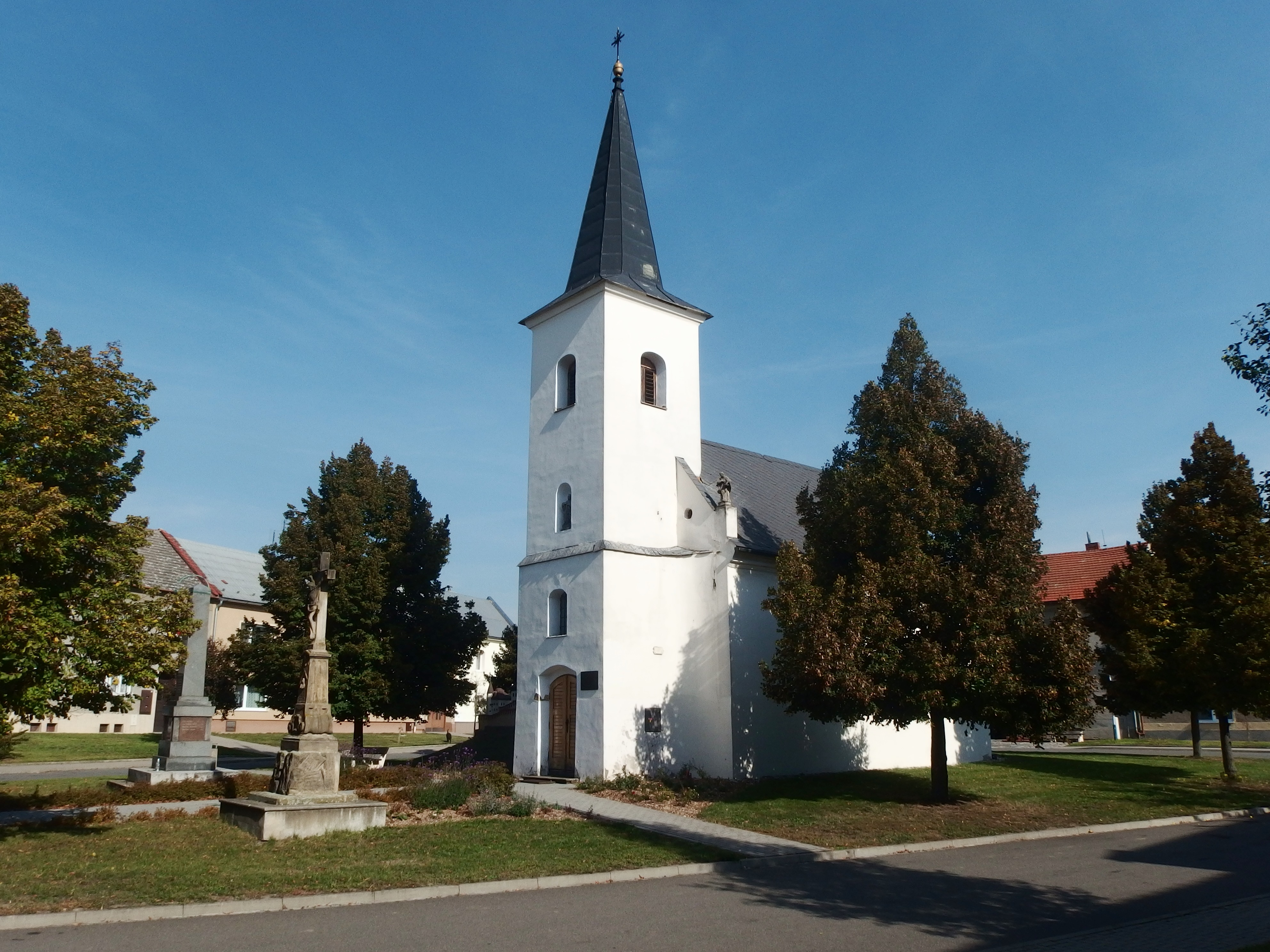
- Chapel of Saint Florian

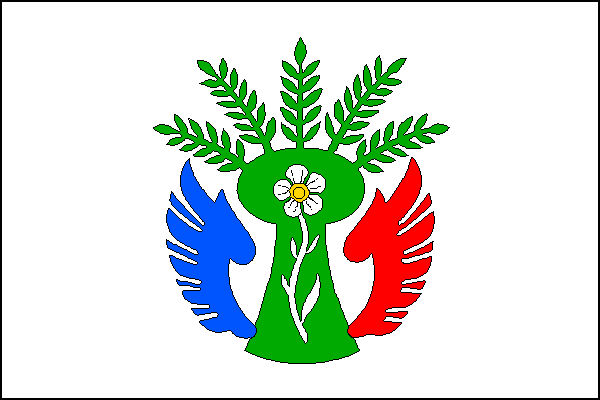
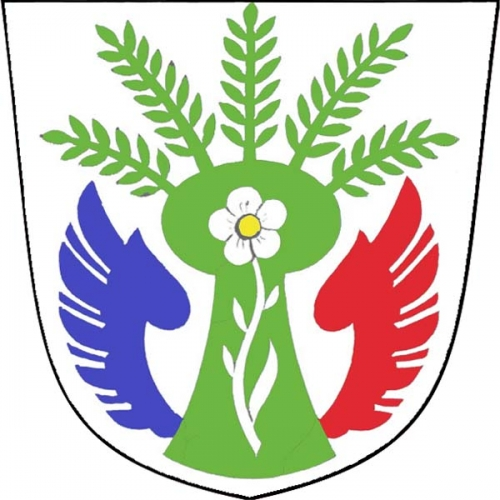
- Flag Coat of arms

- Location in the Czech Republic
- Coordinates: 49°30′29″N 17°12′0″E
- Country: Czech Republic
- Region: Olomouc
- District: Prostějov
- First mentioned: 1359

Area
  - Total: 13.26 km^{2} (5.12 sq mi)
- Elevation: 213 m (699 ft)

Population (2026-01-01)
  - Total: 1,728
  - Density: 130.3/km^{2} (337.5/sq mi)
- Time zone: UTC+1 (CET)
  - Summer (DST): UTC+2 (CEST)
- Postal codes: 798 12, 798 13
- Website: www.vrbatky.cz

Vrbátky is a municipality and village in Prostějov District in the Olomouc Region of the Czech Republic. It has about 1,700 inhabitants.

Vrbátky lies approximately 8 kilometres (5 mi) north-east of Prostějov, 11 km (7 mi) south of Olomouc, and 210 km (130 mi) east of Prague.

== Administrative division ==
Vrbátky consists of three municipal parts (in brackets population according to the 2021 census):

- Vrbátky (821)
- Dubany (571)
- Štětovice (322)

== Demographics ==
Historical population
Year	Pop.	±%
1869	1,236	—
1880	1,577	+27.6%
1890	1,742	+10.5%
1900	1,783	+2.4%
1910	1,954	+9.6%
1921	2,018	+3.3%
1930	2,115	+4.8%
1950	1,854	−12.3%
1961	1,800	−2.9%
1970	1,704	−5.3%
1980	1,621	−4.9%
1991	1,519	−6.3%
2001	1,551	+2.1%
2011	1,612	+3.9%
2021	1,714	+6.3%
Source: Censuses

== Economy ==
A sugar factory has been in Vrbátky since 1870. It was the first sugar factory in Moravia.
