= Lobodice =

- Municipality
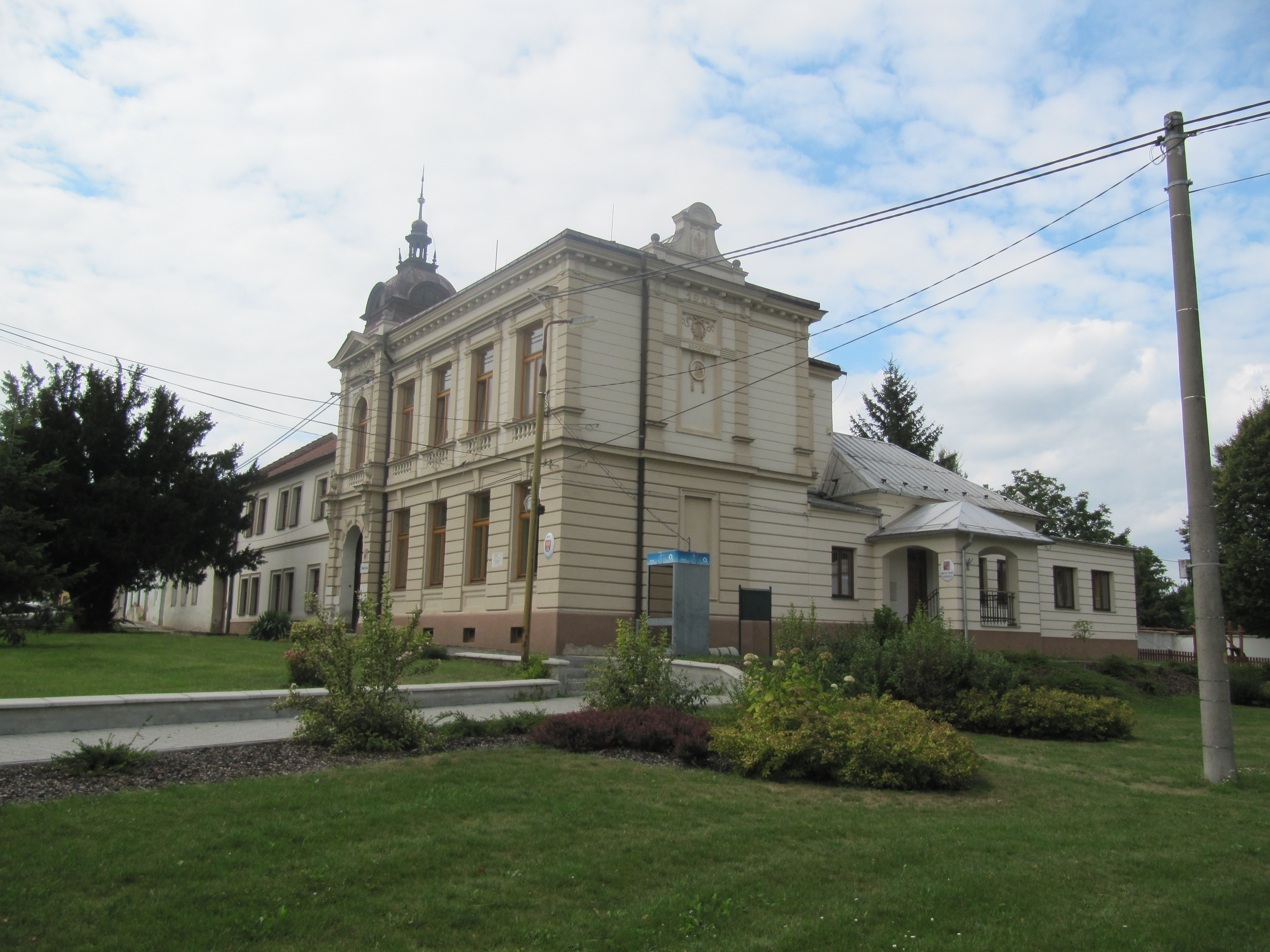
- Municipal office

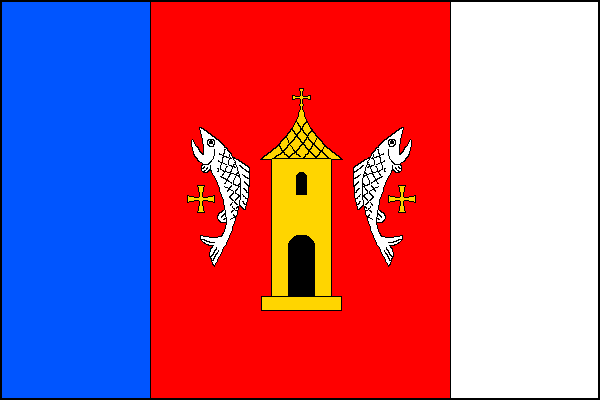
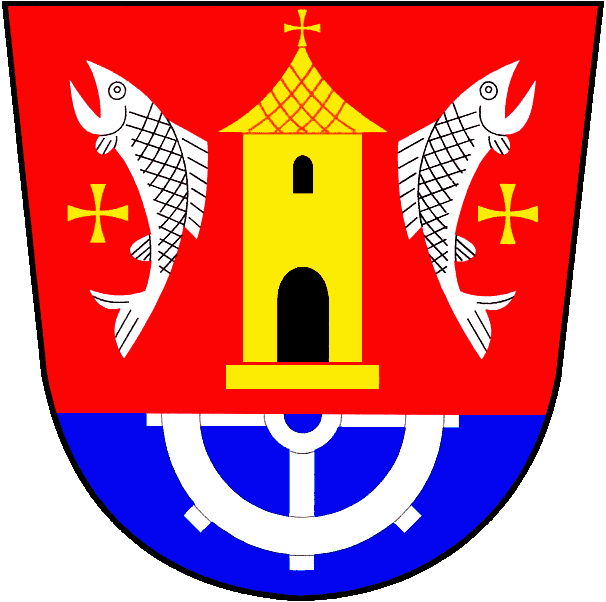
- Flag Coat of arms

- Location in the Czech Republic
- Coordinates: 49°23′44″N 17°17′31″E
- Country: Czech Republic
- Region: Olomouc
- District: Přerov
- First mentioned: 1141

Area
  - Total: 7.19 km^{2} (2.78 sq mi)
- Elevation: 198 m (650 ft)

Population (2026-01-01)
  - Total: 703
  - Density: 97.8/km^{2} (253/sq mi)
- Time zone: UTC+1 (CET)
  - Summer (DST): UTC+2 (CEST)
- Postal code: 751 01
- Website: www.lobodice.cz

Lobodice is a municipality and village in Přerov District in the Olomouc Region of the Czech Republic. It has about 700 inhabitants.

Lobodice lies approximately 14 kilometres (9 mi) south-west of Přerov, 22 km (14 mi) south of Olomouc, and 220 km (140 mi) east of Prague.

== Administrative division ==
Lobodice consists of three municipal parts (in brackets population according to the 2021 census):

- Lobodice (612)
- Chrbov (39)
- Cvrčov (37)

== History ==
The first written mention of Lobodice is in a deed of Bishop Jindřich Zdík from 1141.

== Demographics ==
Historical population
| Year | Pop. | ±% |
|---|---|---|
| 1869 | 828 | — |
| 1880 | 911 | +10.0% |
| 1890 | 982 | +7.8% |
| 1900 | 1,063 | +8.2% |
| 1910 | 978 | −8.0% |
| 1921 | 929 | −5.0% |
| 1930 | 985 | +6.0% |
| 1950 | 842 | −14.5% |
| 1961 | 848 | +0.7% |
| 1970 | 792 | −6.6% |
| 1980 | 809 | +2.1% |
| 1991 | 745 | −7.9% |
| 2001 | 727 | −2.4% |
| 2011 | 700 | −3.7% |
| 2021 | 688 | −1.7% |
Source: Censuses
