= Dub nad Moravou =

- Market town
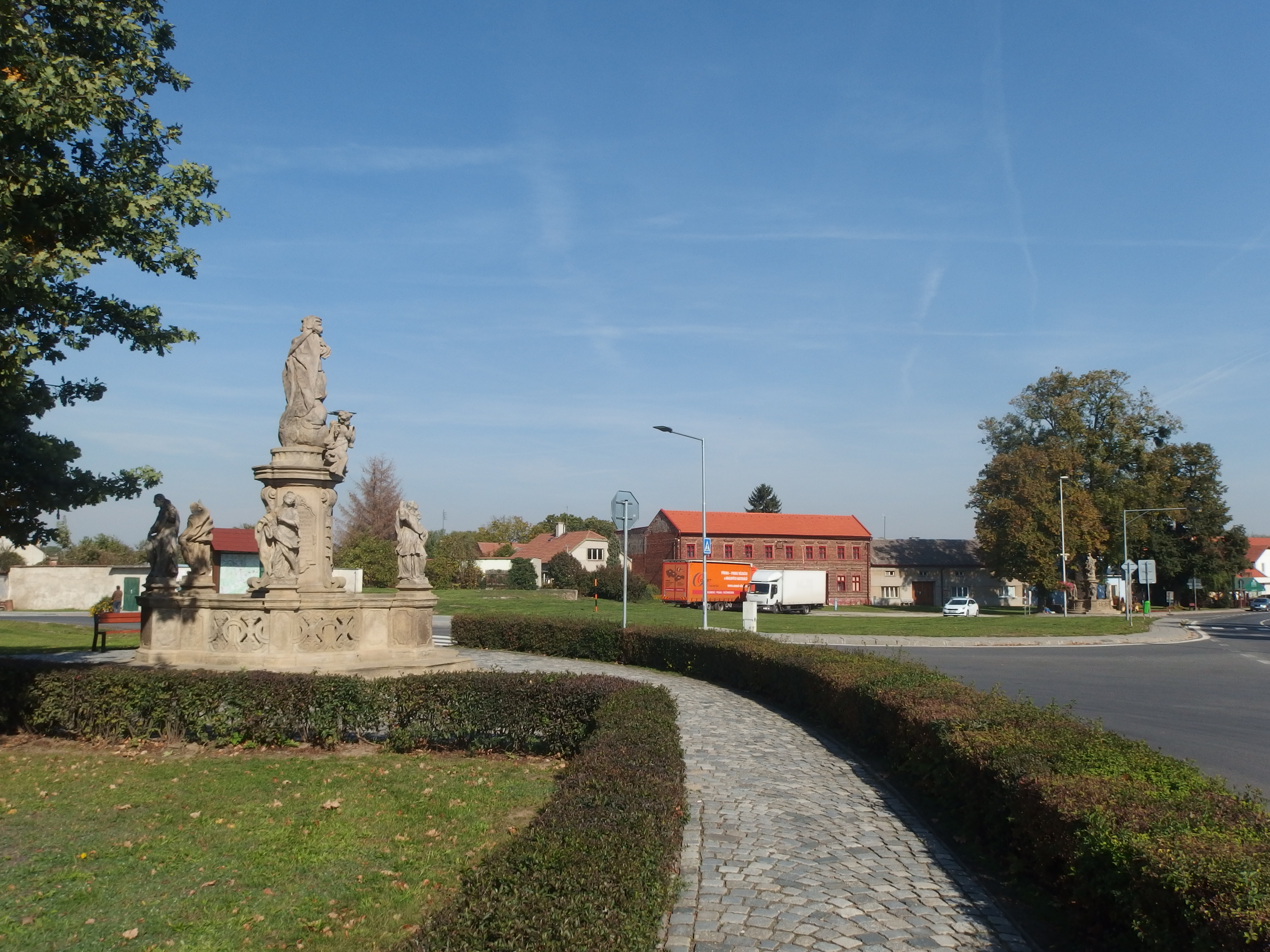
- Square in Dub nad Moravou

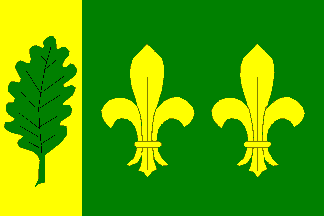
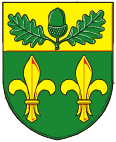
- Flag Coat of arms

- Location in the Czech Republic
- Coordinates: 49°28′57″N 17°16′38″E
- Country: Czech Republic
- Region: Olomouc
- District: Olomouc
- First mentioned: 1141

Area
  - Total: 15.23 km^{2} (5.88 sq mi)
- Elevation: 212 m (696 ft)

Population (2026-01-01)
  - Total: 1,619
  - Density: 106.3/km^{2} (275.3/sq mi)
- Time zone: UTC+1 (CET)
  - Summer (DST): UTC+2 (CEST)
- Postal code: 783 75
- Website: www.dubnadmoravou.cz

Dub nad Moravou (Czech pronunciation: [ˈdup ˈnad moravou]) is a market town in Olomouc District in the Olomouc Region of the Czech Republic. It has about 1,600 inhabitants.

== Administrative division ==
Dub nad Moravou consists of three municipal parts (in brackets population according to the 2021 census):

- Dub nad Moravou (938)
- Bolelouc (413)
- Tučapy (183)

== Etymology ==
The name means 'oak upon the Morava' in Czech.

== Geography ==
Dub nad Moravou is located about 12 kilometres (7 mi) south of Olomouc. It lies in a flat agricultural landscape in the Upper Morava Valley. The market town is situated on the right bank of the Morava River. The Blata River flows along the western municipal border.

== History ==
The first written mention of Dub nad Moravou is in a deed of Bishop Jindřich Zdík from 1141, when the village was owned by the Olomouc bishopric. During the Thirty Years' War, the village was badly damaged. In 1848, Dub nad Moravou was promoted to a market town.

Tučapy was mentioned in Jindřich Zdík's deed as a property of the Church of Saint Wenceslaus in Olomouc. From 1232 to 1848, it was owned by the Olomouc bishopric. Bolelouc was first mentioned in 1232 and for most of its history, it was part of the Tovačov estate.

== Demographics ==
Historical population

| Year | Pop. | ±% |
|---|---|---|
| 1869 | 1,829 | — |
| 1880 | 1,958 | +7.1% |
| 1890 | 2,068 | +5.6% |
| 1900 | 2,087 | +0.9% |
| 1910 | 2,122 | +1.7% |

| Year | Pop. | ±% |
|---|---|---|
| 1921 | 2,174 | +2.5% |
| 1930 | 2,110 | −2.9% |
| 1950 | 1,653 | −21.7% |
| 1961 | 1,729 | +4.6% |
| 1970 | 1,617 | −6.5% |

| Year | Pop. | ±% |
|---|---|---|
| 1980 | 1,451 | −10.3% |
| 1991 | 1,318 | −9.2% |
| 2001 | 1,418 | +7.6% |
| 2011 | 1,515 | +6.8% |
| 2021 | 1,534 | +1.3% |

Source: Censuses

== Transport ==
There are no railways or major roads passing through the municipality.

== Sights ==
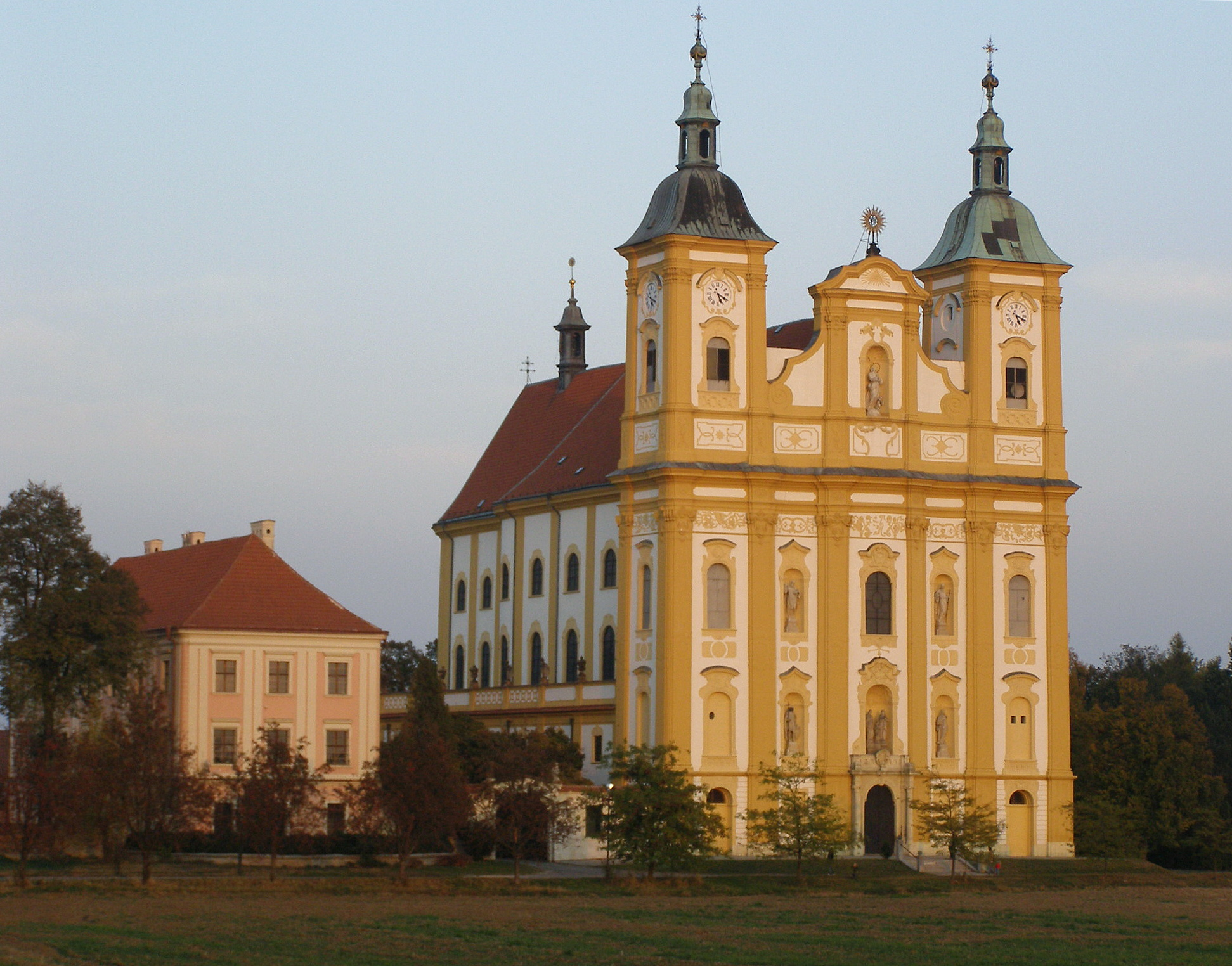
Church of the Purification of Mary

The main landmark of Dub nad Moravou is the Church of the Purification of Mary. It was built in the late Baroque style in 1734–1756. It is a Marian pilgrimage site.
