= Hrdibořice =

- Municipality
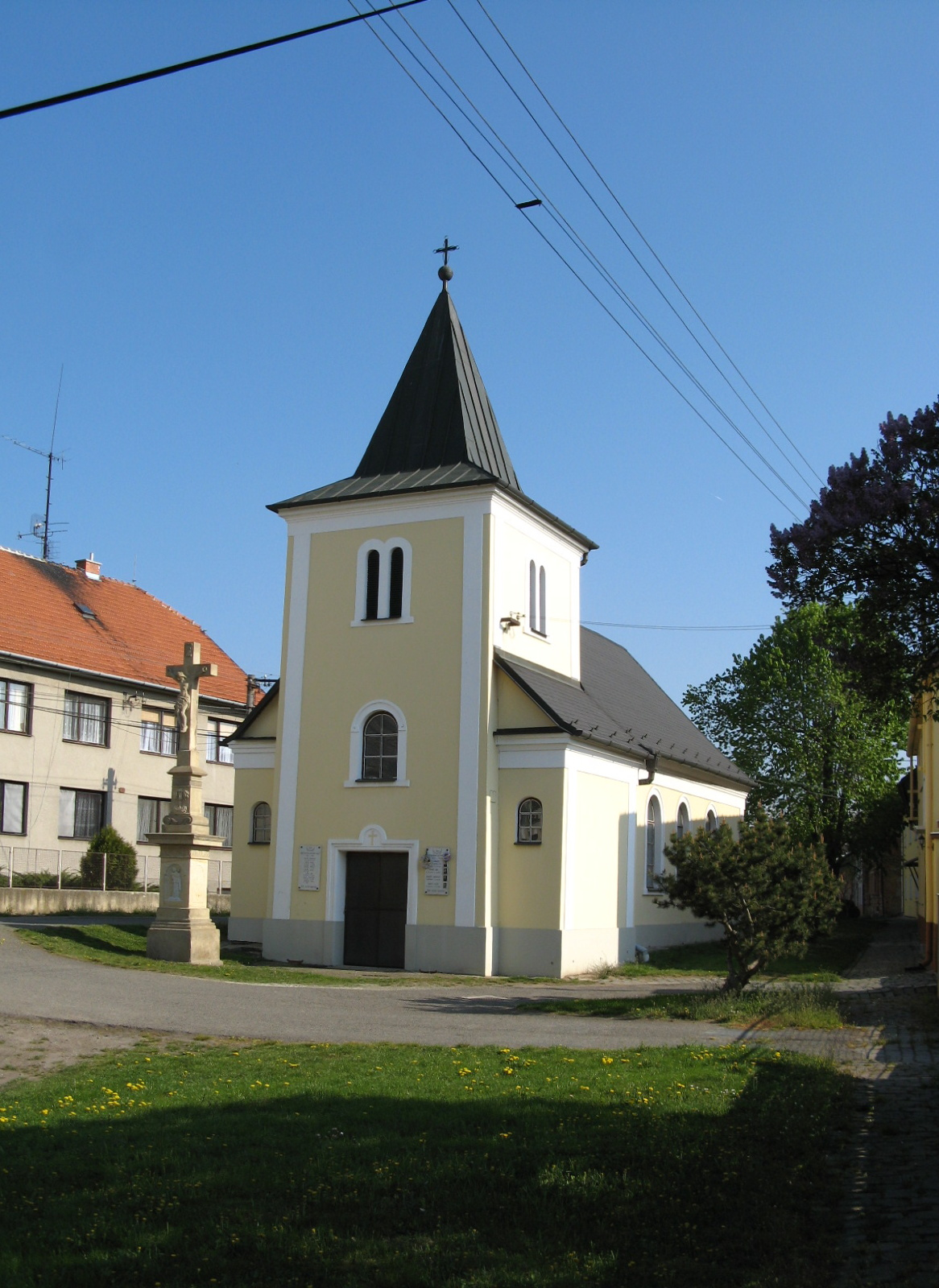
- Chapel of Saint Florian

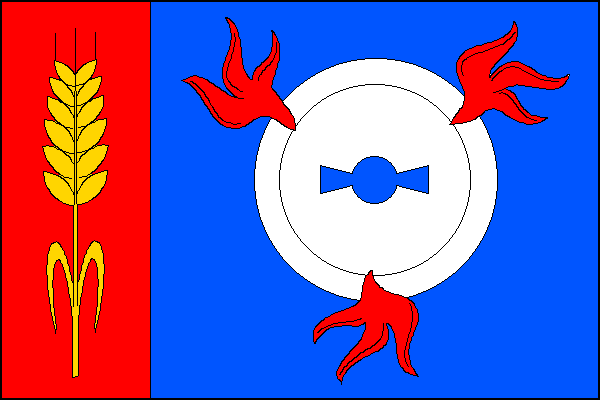
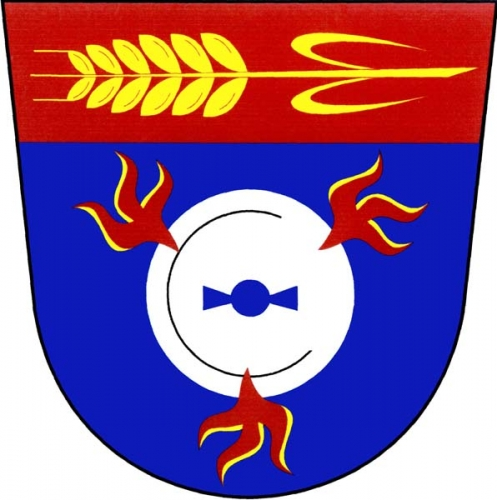
- Flag Coat of arms

- Location in the Czech Republic
- Coordinates: 49°28′43″N 17°13′14″E
- Country: Czech Republic
- Region: Olomouc
- District: Prostějov
- First mentioned: 1254

Area
  - Total: 3.79 km^{2} (1.46 sq mi)
- Elevation: 214 m (702 ft)

Population (2026-01-01)
  - Total: 205
  - Density: 54.1/km^{2} (140/sq mi)
- Time zone: UTC+1 (CET)
  - Summer (DST): UTC+2 (CEST)
- Postal code: 798 12
- Website: www.hrdiborice.cz

Hrdibořice is a municipality and village in Prostějov District in the Olomouc Region of the Czech Republic. It has about 200 inhabitants.

Hrdibořice lies approximately 9 kilometres (6 mi) east of Prostějov, 13 km (8 mi) south of Olomouc, and 213 km (132 mi) east of Prague.

== Demographics ==
Historical population
Year	Pop.	±%
1869	207	—
1880	234	+13.0%
1890	249	+6.4%
1900	271	+8.8%
1910	286	+5.5%
1921	317	+10.8%
1930	280	−11.7%
1950	248	−11.4%
1961	264	+6.5%
1970	241	−8.7%
1980	258	+7.1%
1991	253	−1.9%
2001	241	−4.7%
2011	210	−12.9%
2021	206	−1.9%
Source: Censuses
