= Charváty =

- Municipality
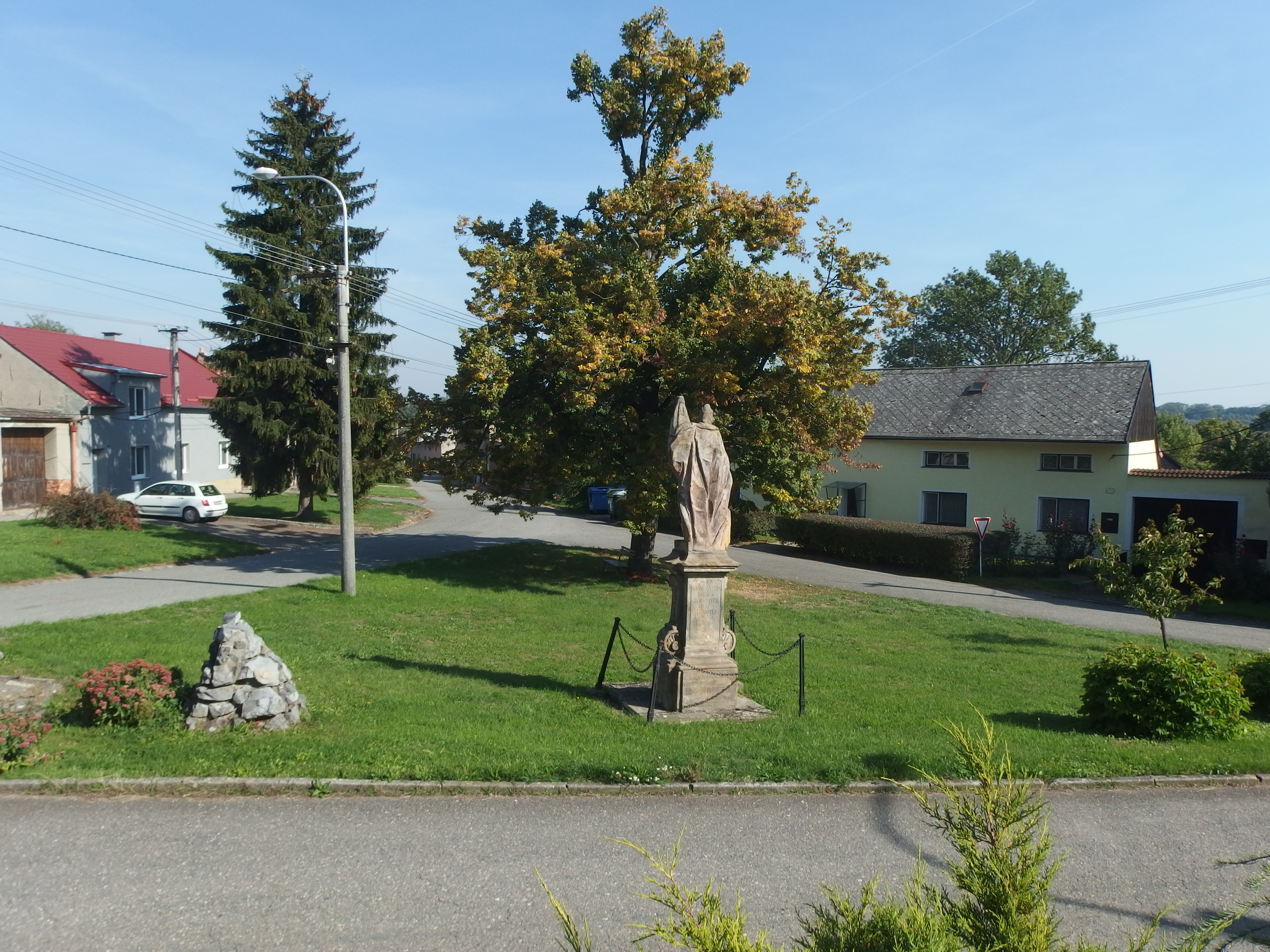
- Common with a statue of Saint Florian

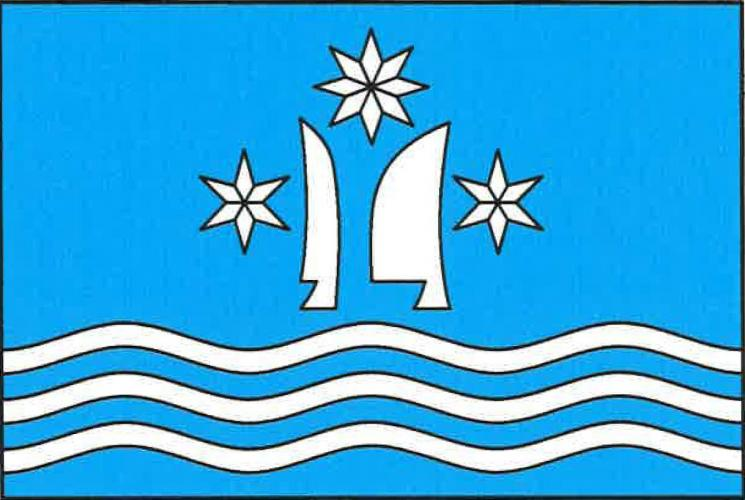
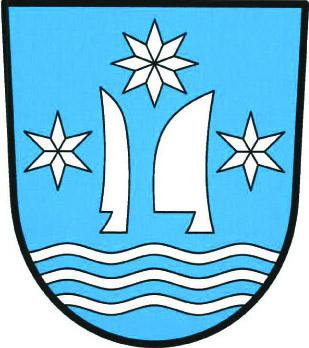
- Flag Coat of arms

- Location in the Czech Republic
- Coordinates: 49°31′6″N 17°15′14″E
- Country: Czech Republic
- Region: Olomouc
- District: Olomouc
- First mentioned: 1347

Area
  - Total: 8.88 km^{2} (3.43 sq mi)
- Elevation: 226 m (741 ft)

Population (2026-01-01)
  - Total: 941
  - Density: 106/km^{2} (274/sq mi)
- Time zone: UTC+1 (CET)
  - Summer (DST): UTC+2 (CEST)
- Postal code: 783 74
- Website: www.charvaty.cz

Charváty a municipality and village in Olomouc District in the Olomouc Region of the Czech Republic. It has about 900 inhabitants.

Charváty lies approximately 9 kilometres (6 mi) south of Olomouc and 214 km (133 mi) east of Prague.

== Administrative division ==
Charváty consists of three municipal parts (in brackets population according to the 2021 census):

- Charváty (403)
- Čertoryje (178)
- Drahlov (290)

== Demographics ==
Historical population
Year	Pop.	±%
1869	810	—
1880	843	+4.1%
1890	951	+12.8%
1900	967	+1.7%
1910	1,080	+11.7%
1921	1,109	+2.7%
1930	1,158	+4.4%
1950	967	−16.5%
1961	935	−3.3%
1970	786	−15.9%
1980	704	−10.4%
1991	685	−2.7%
2001	734	+7.2%
2011	840	+14.4%
2021	871	+3.7%
Source: Censuses
