= Daskabát =

- Municipality
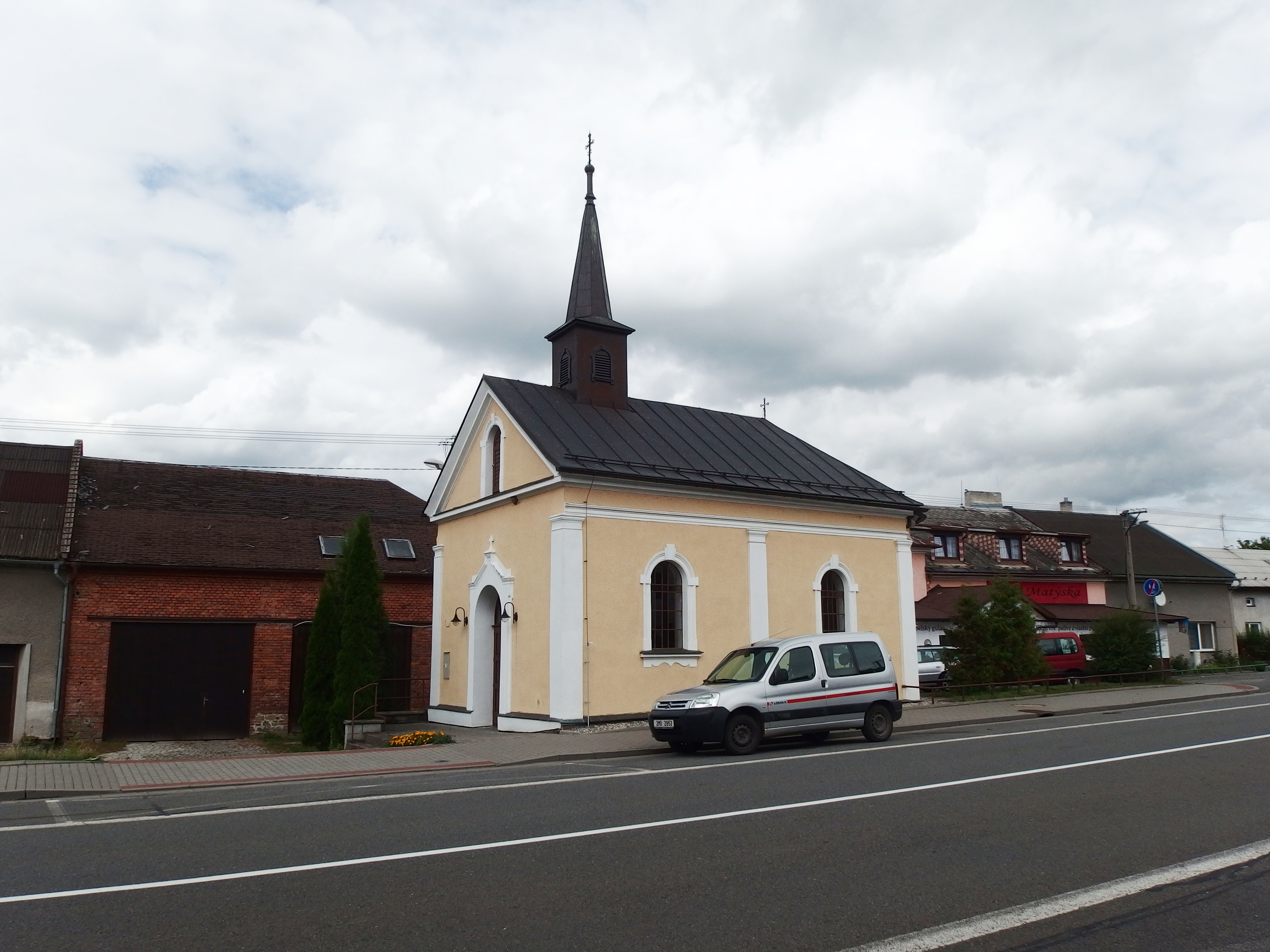
- Chapel of Saint John of Nepomuk

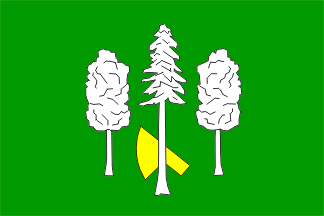
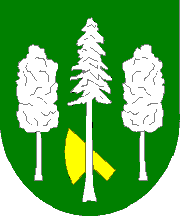
- Flag Coat of arms

- Location in the Czech Republic
- Coordinates: 49°34′43″N 17°26′50″E
- Country: Czech Republic
- Region: Olomouc
- District: Olomouc
- First mentioned: 1232

Area
  - Total: 5.83 km^{2} (2.25 sq mi)
- Elevation: 337 m (1,106 ft)

Population (2026-01-01)
  - Total: 627
  - Density: 108/km^{2} (279/sq mi)
- Time zone: UTC+1 (CET)
  - Summer (DST): UTC+2 (CEST)
- Postal code: 772 00
- Website: www.obecdaskabat.cz

Daskabát is a municipality and village in Olomouc District in the Olomouc Region of the Czech Republic. It has about 600 inhabitants.

Daskabát lies approximately 15 kilometres (9 mi) east of Olomouc and 225 km (140 mi) east of Prague.

== History ==
The first written mention of the village of Otěhřiby, which was a predecessor of Daskabát, is from 1232. Otěhřiby was destroyed during the Bohemian–Hungarian War (1468–1478) and was renewed in the 16th century, first under the name Nová Ves (1568) and since 1581 known as Daskabát.

== Demographics ==
Historical population
Year	Pop.	±%
1869	370	—
1880	416	+12.4%
1890	469	+12.7%
1900	524	+11.7%
1910	567	+8.2%
1921	552	−2.6%
1930	538	−2.5%
1950	583	+8.4%
1961	650	+11.5%
1970	667	+2.6%
1980	660	−1.0%
1991	618	−6.4%
2001	591	−4.4%
2011	603	+2.0%
2021	600	−0.5%
Source: Censuses
