= Olšany u Prostějova =

- Municipality
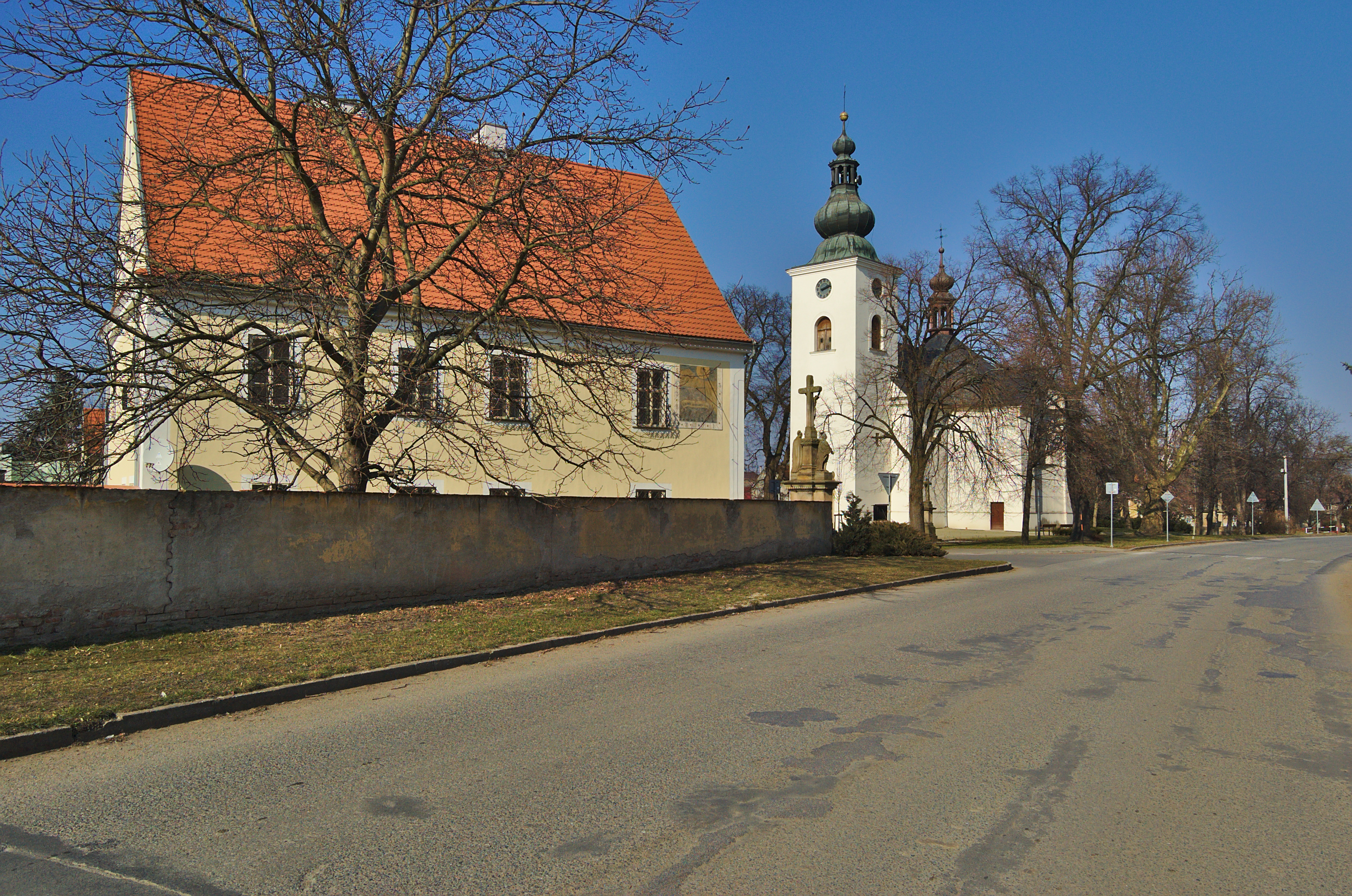
- Church of Saint John the Baptist

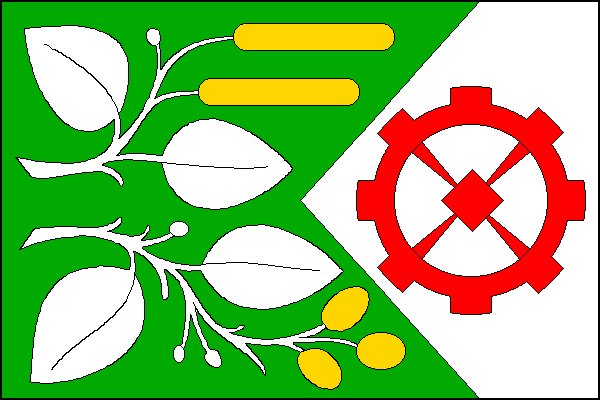
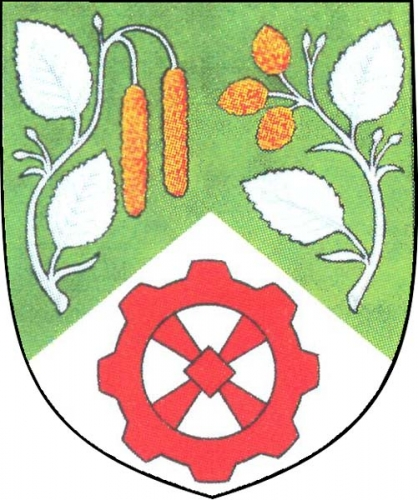
- Flag Coat of arms

- Location in the Czech Republic
- Coordinates: 49°32′11″N 17°9′53″E
- Country: Czech Republic
- Region: Olomouc
- District: Prostějov
- First mentioned: 1141

Area
  - Total: 11.04 km^{2} (4.26 sq mi)
- Elevation: 217 m (712 ft)

Population (2026-01-01)
  - Total: 1,868
  - Density: 169.2/km^{2} (438.2/sq mi)
- Time zone: UTC+1 (CET)
  - Summer (DST): UTC+2 (CEST)
- Postal code: 798 14
- Website: www.olsanyupv.cz

Olšany u Prostějova is a municipality and village in Prostějov District in the Olomouc Region of the Czech Republic. It has about 1,900 inhabitants.

Olšany u Prostějova lies approximately 8 kilometres (5 mi) north-east of Prostějov, 10 km (6 mi) south-west of Olomouc, and 206 km (128 mi) east of Prague.

== Administrative division ==
Olšany u Prostějova consists of two municipal parts (in brackets population according to the 2021 census):

- Olšany u Prostějova (1,606)
- Hablov (171)

== History ==
The first written mention of Olšany u Prostějova is in a deed of bishop Jindřich Zdík from 1141.

== Demographics ==
Historical population
| Year | Pop. | ±% |
|---|---|---|
| 1869 | 1,352 | — |
| 1880 | 1,417 | +4.8% |
| 1890 | 1,546 | +9.1% |
| 1900 | 1,607 | +3.9% |
| 1910 | 1,762 | +9.6% |
| 1921 | 1,662 | −5.7% |
| 1930 | 1,837 | +10.5% |
| 1950 | 1,616 | −12.0% |
| 1961 | 1,632 | +1.0% |
| 1970 | 1,489 | −8.8% |
| 1980 | 1,437 | −3.5% |
| 1991 | 1,414 | −1.6% |
| 2001 | 1,405 | −0.6% |
| 2011 | 1,571 | +11.8% |
| 2021 | 1,777 | +13.1% |
Source: Censuses
