= Suchonice =

- Municipality
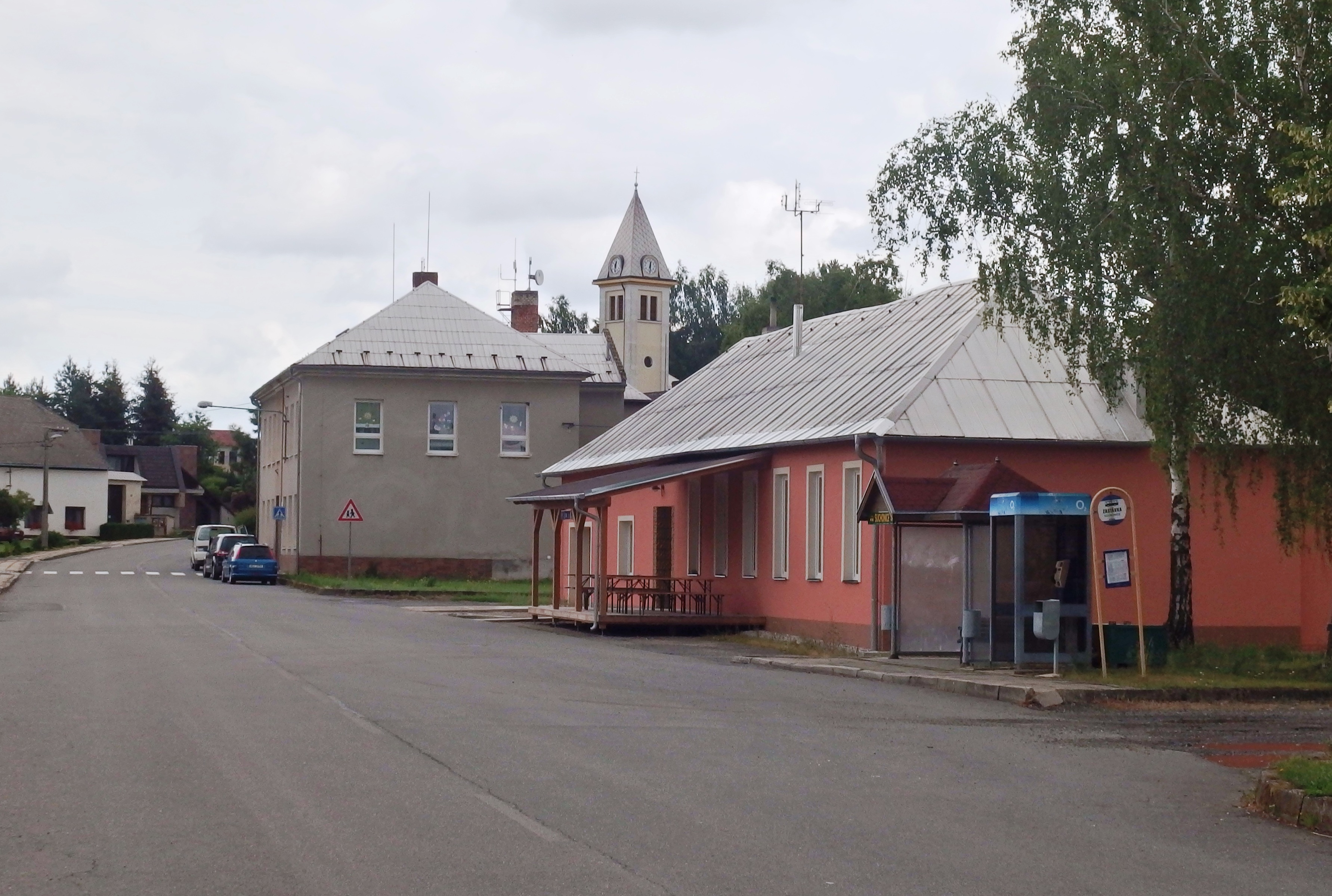
- Kindergarten in the centre of Suchonice

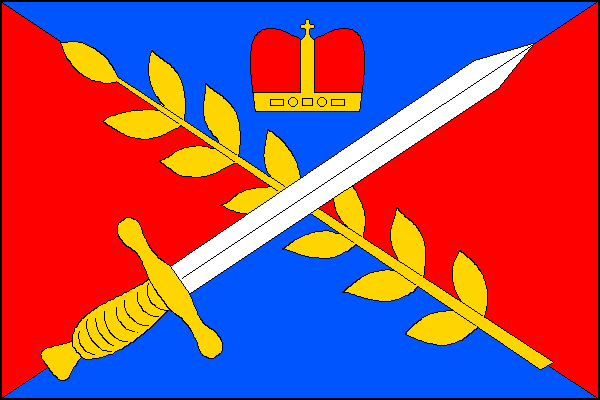
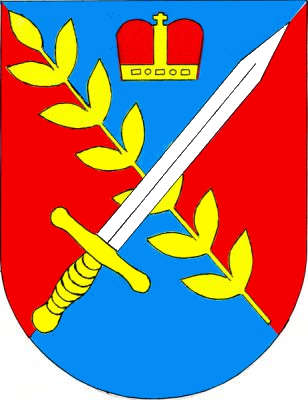
- Flag Coat of arms

- Location in the Czech Republic
- Coordinates: 49°31′37″N 17°22′55″E
- Country: Czech Republic
- Region: Olomouc
- District: Olomouc
- First mentioned: 1303

Area
  - Total: 3.46 km^{2} (1.34 sq mi)
- Elevation: 301 m (988 ft)

Population (2026-01-01)
  - Total: 175
  - Density: 50.6/km^{2} (131/sq mi)
- Time zone: UTC+1 (CET)
  - Summer (DST): UTC+2 (CEST)
- Postal code: 783 57
- Website: www.suchonice.cz

Suchonice is a municipality and village in Olomouc District in the Olomouc Region of the Czech Republic. It has about 200 inhabitants.

Suchonice lies approximately 13 kilometres (8 mi) south-east of Olomouc and 222 km (138 mi) east of Prague.

== Demographics ==
Historical population
| Year | Pop. | ±% |
|---|---|---|
| 1869 | 268 | — |
| 1880 | 302 | +12.7% |
| 1890 | 319 | +5.6% |
| 1900 | 314 | −1.6% |
| 1910 | 328 | +4.5% |
| 1921 | 284 | −13.4% |
| 1930 | 293 | +3.2% |
| 1950 | 242 | −17.4% |
| 1961 | 244 | +0.8% |
| 1970 | 194 | −20.5% |
| 1980 | 199 | +2.6% |
| 1991 | 159 | −20.1% |
| 2001 | 151 | −5.0% |
| 2011 | 166 | +9.9% |
| 2021 | 163 | −1.8% |
Source: Censuses
