= Senička =

- Municipality
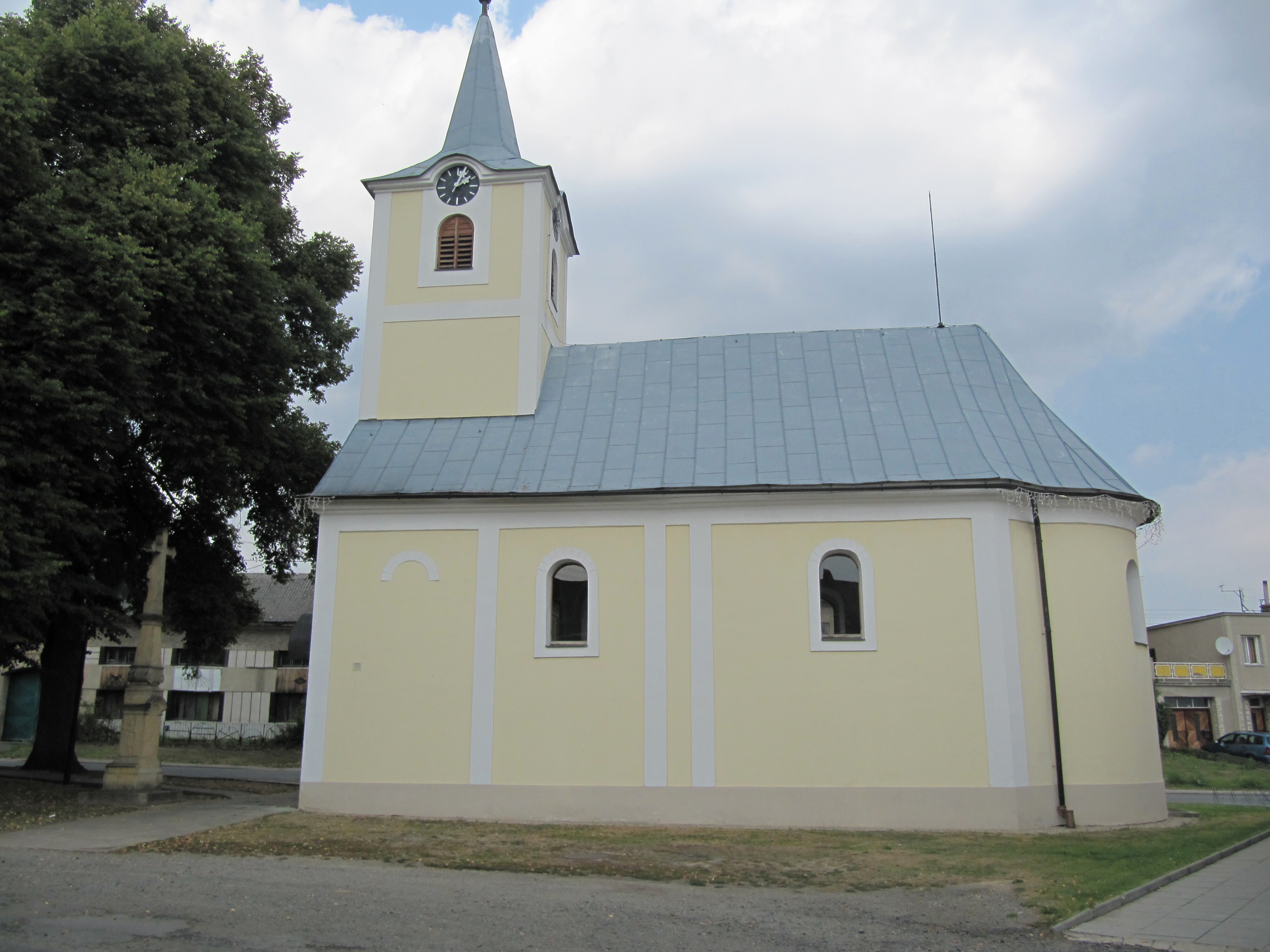
- Chapel of the Guardian Angels

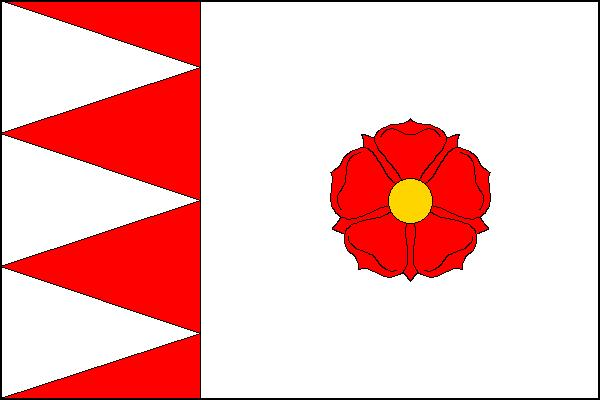
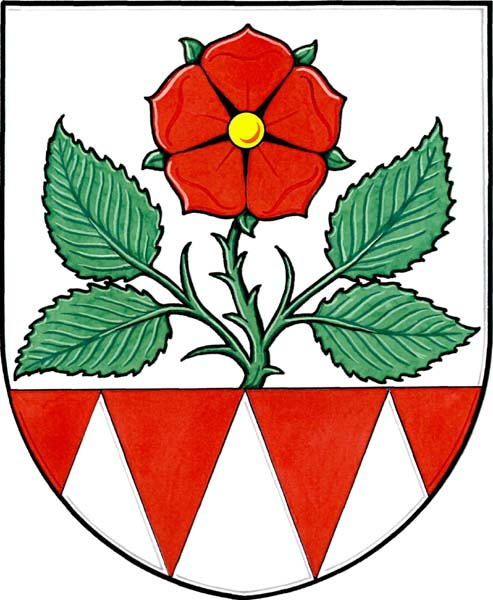
- Flag Coat of arms

- Location in the Czech Republic
- Coordinates: 49°37′56″N 17°3′23″E
- Country: Czech Republic
- Region: Olomouc
- District: Olomouc
- First mentioned: 1349

Area
  - Total: 5.69 km^{2} (2.20 sq mi)
- Elevation: 260 m (850 ft)

Population (2026-01-01)
  - Total: 354
  - Density: 62.2/km^{2} (161/sq mi)
- Time zone: UTC+1 (CET)
  - Summer (DST): UTC+2 (CEST)
- Postal code: 783 45
- Website: www.senicka.cz

Senička is a municipality and village in Olomouc District in the Olomouc Region of the Czech Republic. It has about 400 inhabitants.

Senička lies approximately 15 kilometres (9 mi) west of Olomouc and 197 km (122 mi) east of Prague.

== Demographics ==
Historical population
Year	Pop.	±%
1869	485	—
1880	496	+2.3%
1890	485	−2.2%
1900	511	+5.4%
1910	533	+4.3%
1921	599	+12.4%
1930	547	−8.7%
1950	424	−22.5%
1961	437	+3.1%
1970	414	−5.3%
1980	360	−13.0%
1991	316	−12.2%
2001	340	+7.6%
2011	336	−1.2%
2021	331	−1.5%
Source: Censuses
