= Klopotovice =

- Municipality
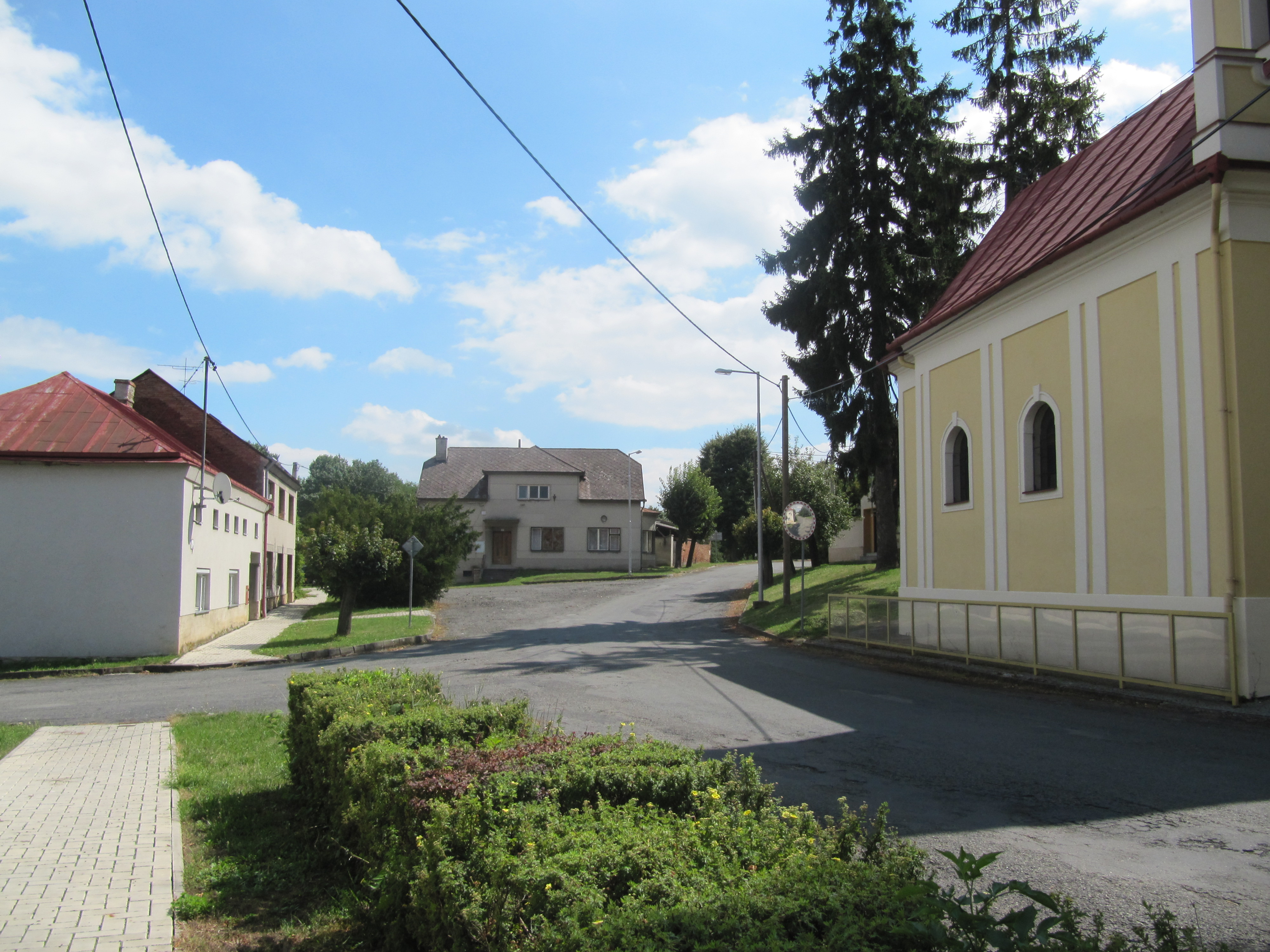
- Centre of Klopotovice

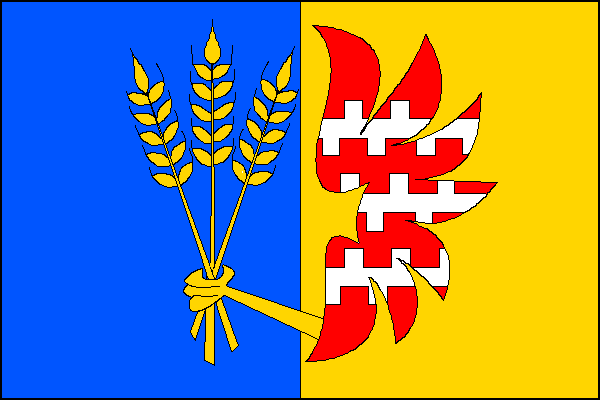
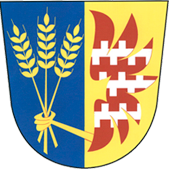
- Flag Coat of arms

- Location in the Czech Republic
- Coordinates: 49°26′46″N 17°15′3″E
- Country: Czech Republic
- Region: Olomouc
- District: Prostějov
- First mentioned: 1213

Area
  - Total: 5.33 km^{2} (2.06 sq mi)
- Elevation: 207 m (679 ft)

Population (2026-01-01)
  - Total: 306
  - Density: 57.4/km^{2} (149/sq mi)
- Time zone: UTC+1 (CET)
  - Summer (DST): UTC+2 (CEST)
- Postal code: 798 21
- Website: www.klopotovice.cz

Klopotovice is a municipality and village in Prostějov District in the Olomouc Region of the Czech Republic. It has about 300 inhabitants.

Klopotovice lies approximately 11 kilometres (7 mi) east of Prostějov, 17 km (11 mi) south of Olomouc, and 216 km (134 mi) east of Prague.

== Demographics ==
Historical population
Year	Pop.	±%
1869	303	—
1880	347	+14.5%
1890	354	+2.0%
1900	319	−9.9%
1910	335	+5.0%
1921	355	+6.0%
1930	358	+0.8%
1950	289	−19.3%
1961	300	+3.8%
1970	258	−14.0%
1980	235	−8.9%
1991	249	+6.0%
2001	288	+15.7%
2011	263	−8.7%
2021	280	+6.5%
Source: Censuses
