= Bystročice =

- Municipality
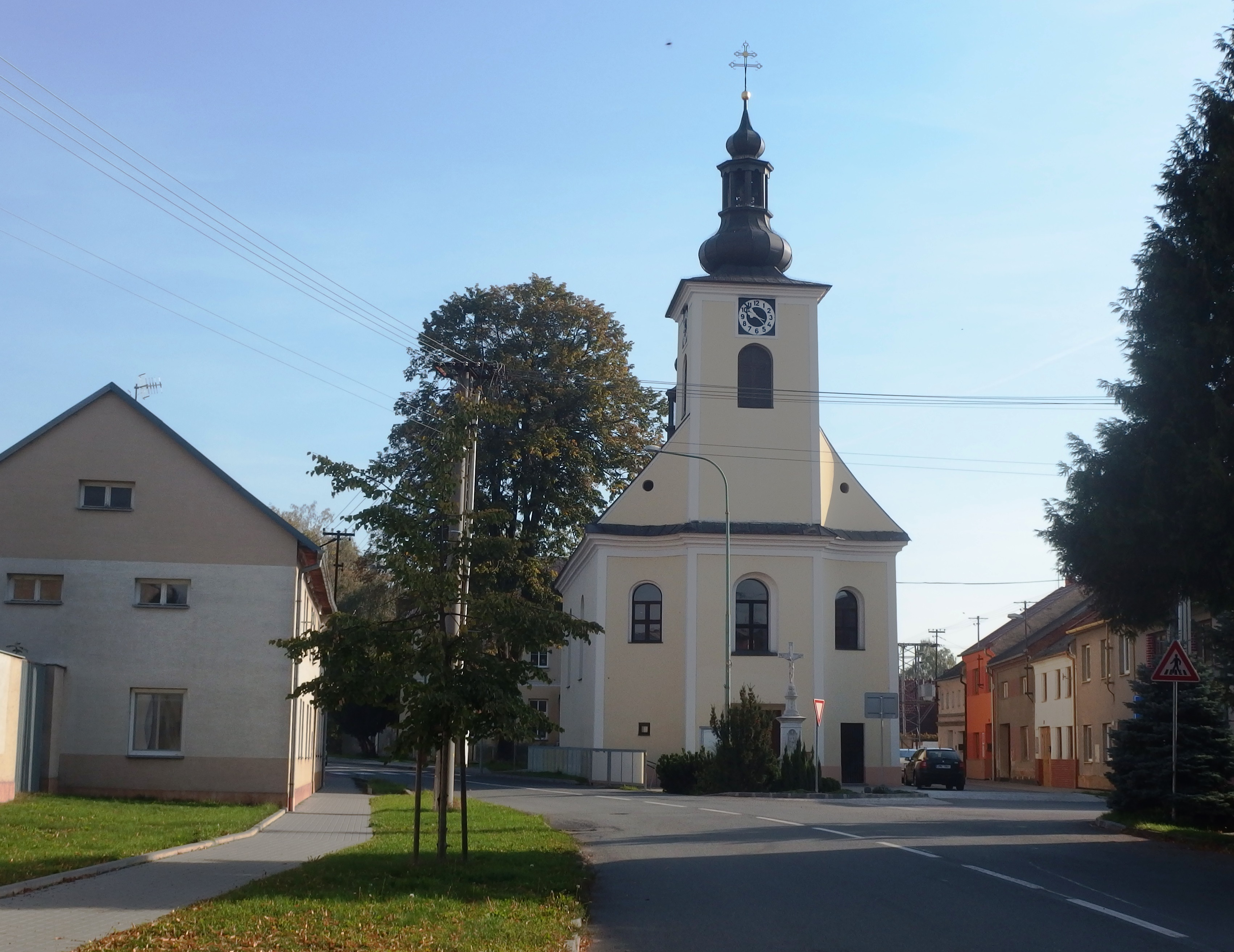
- Church of Saints Cyril and Methodius

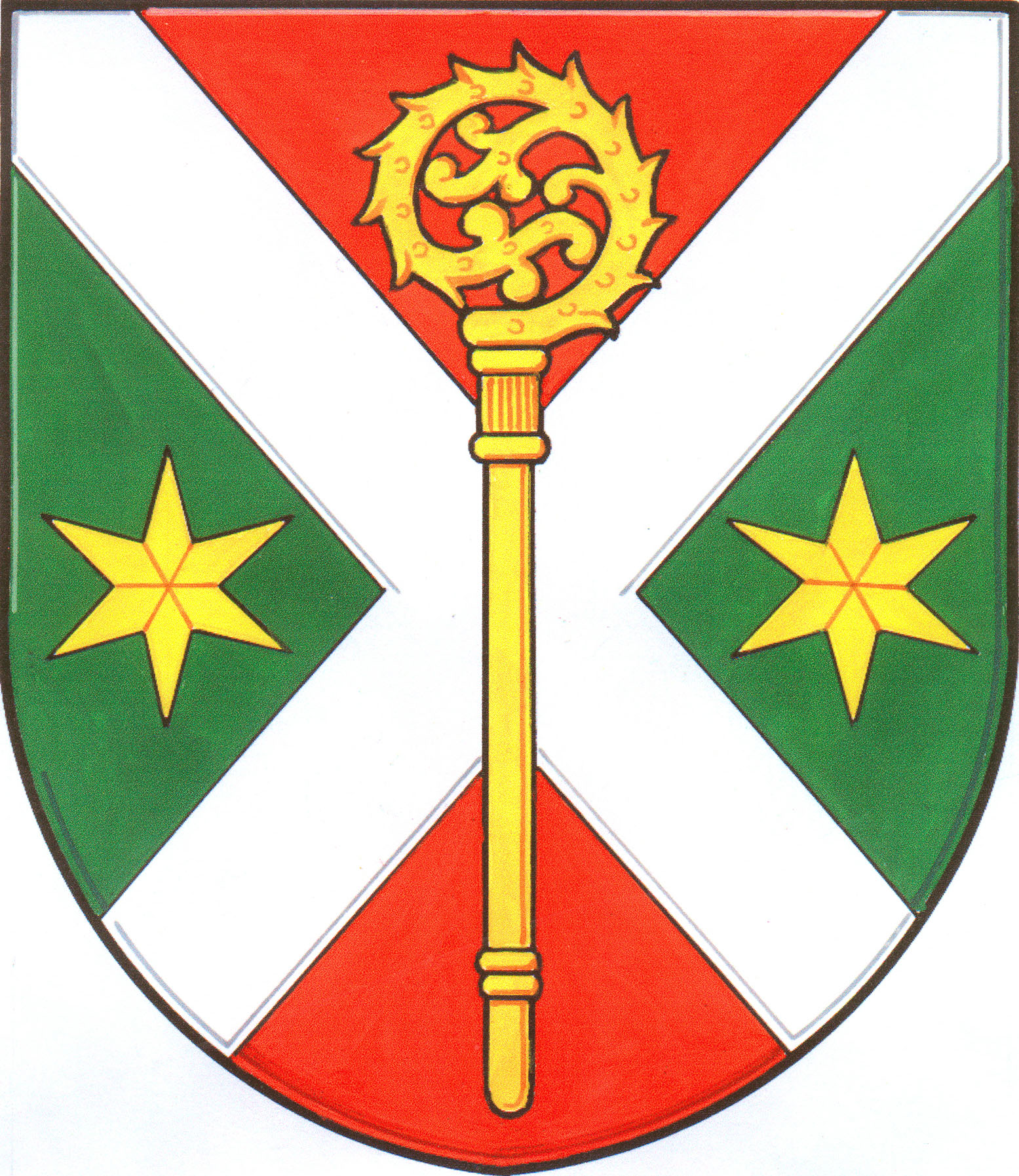
- Flag Coat of arms

- Location in the Czech Republic
- Coordinates: 49°32′11″N 17°11′37″E
- Country: Czech Republic
- Region: Olomouc
- District: Olomouc
- First mentioned: 1141

Area
  - Total: 8.01 km^{2} (3.09 sq mi)
- Elevation: 215 m (705 ft)

Population (2026-01-01)
  - Total: 842
  - Density: 105/km^{2} (272/sq mi)
- Time zone: UTC+1 (CET)
  - Summer (DST): UTC+2 (CEST)
- Postal code: 783 41
- Website: www.obecbystrocice.cz

Bystročice is a municipality and village in Olomouc District in the Olomouc Region of the Czech Republic. It has about 800 inhabitants.

Bystročice lies approximately 8 kilometres (5 mi) south-west of Olomouc and 209 km (130 mi) east of Prague.

== Administrative division ==
Bystročice consists of two municipal parts (in brackets population according to the 2021 census):

- Bystročice (647)
- Žerůvky (195)

== History ==
The first written mention of Bystročice is in a deed of bishop Jindřich Zdík from 1141.

== Demographics ==
Historical population
Year	Pop.	±%
1869	551	—
1880	595	+8.0%
1890	659	+10.8%
1900	666	+1.1%
1910	729	+9.5%
1921	758	+4.0%
1930	810	+6.9%
1950	692	−14.6%
1961	712	+2.9%
1970	669	−6.0%
1980	667	−0.3%
1991	606	−9.1%
2001	597	−1.5%
2011	740	+24.0%
2021	842	+13.8%
Source: Censuses
