= Blatec =

- Municipality
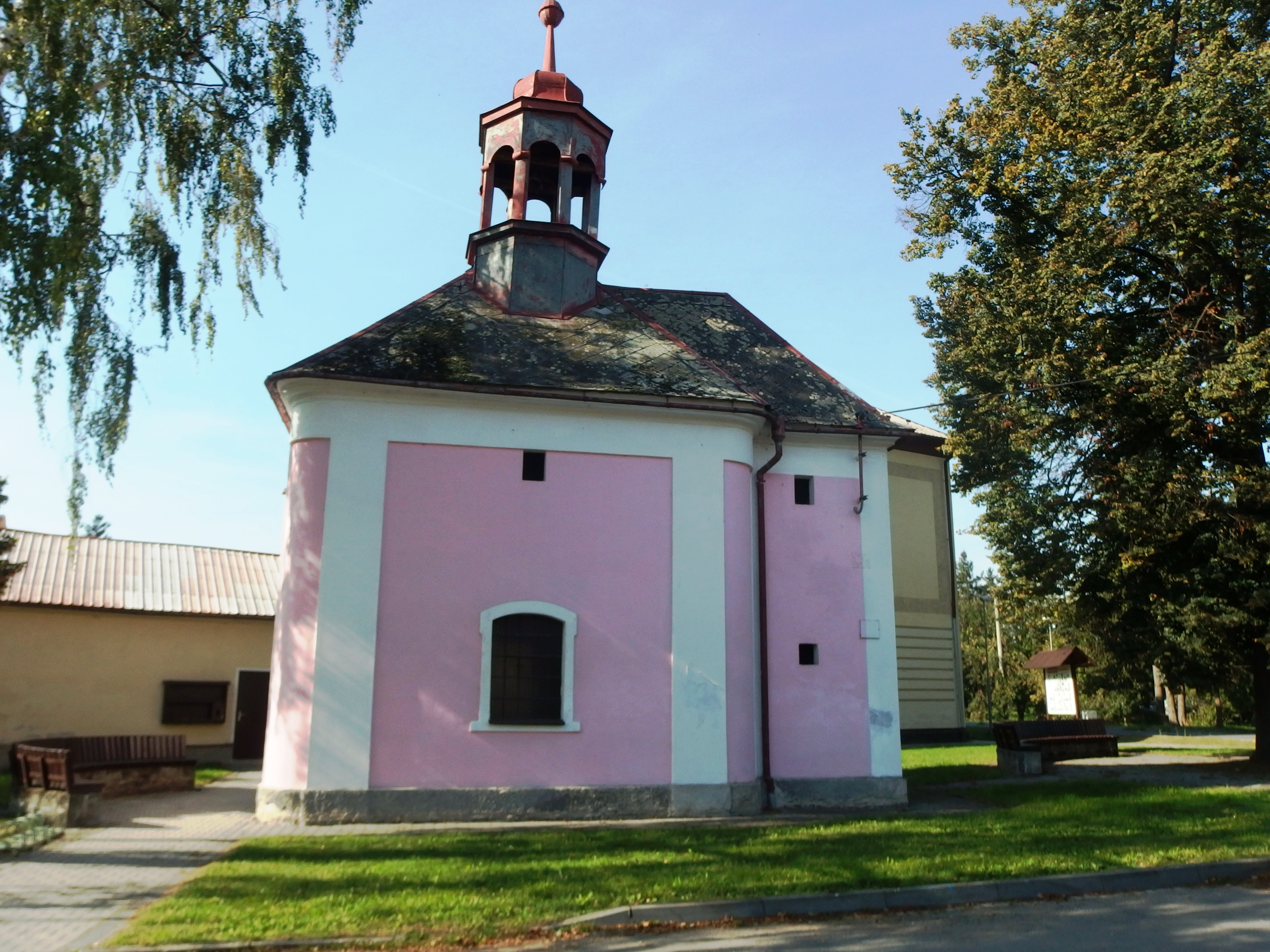
- Chapel of Saint Margaret the Virgin

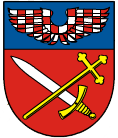
- Flag Coat of arms

- Location in the Czech Republic
- Coordinates: 49°31′42″N 17°14′19″E
- Country: Czech Republic
- Region: Olomouc
- District: Olomouc
- First mentioned: 1131

Area
  - Total: 6.58 km^{2} (2.54 sq mi)
- Elevation: 224 m (735 ft)

Population (2026-01-01)
  - Total: 645
  - Density: 98.0/km^{2} (254/sq mi)
- Time zone: UTC+1 (CET)
  - Summer (DST): UTC+2 (CEST)
- Postal code: 783 75
- Website: www.blatec.cz

Blatec is a municipality and village in Olomouc District in the Olomouc Region of the Czech Republic. It has about 600 inhabitants.

Blatec lies approximately 8 kilometres (5 mi) south of Olomouc and 212 km (132 mi) east of Prague.

== Demographics ==
Historical population
Year	Pop.	±%
1869	399	—
1880	504	+26.3%
1890	515	+2.2%
1900	480	−6.8%
1910	535	+11.5%
1921	537	+0.4%
1930	582	+8.4%
1950	511	−12.2%
1961	544	+6.5%
1970	525	−3.5%
1980	576	+9.7%
1991	569	−1.2%
2001	569	+0.0%
2011	597	+4.9%
2021	647	+8.4%
Source: Censuses
