= Loučany =

- Municipality
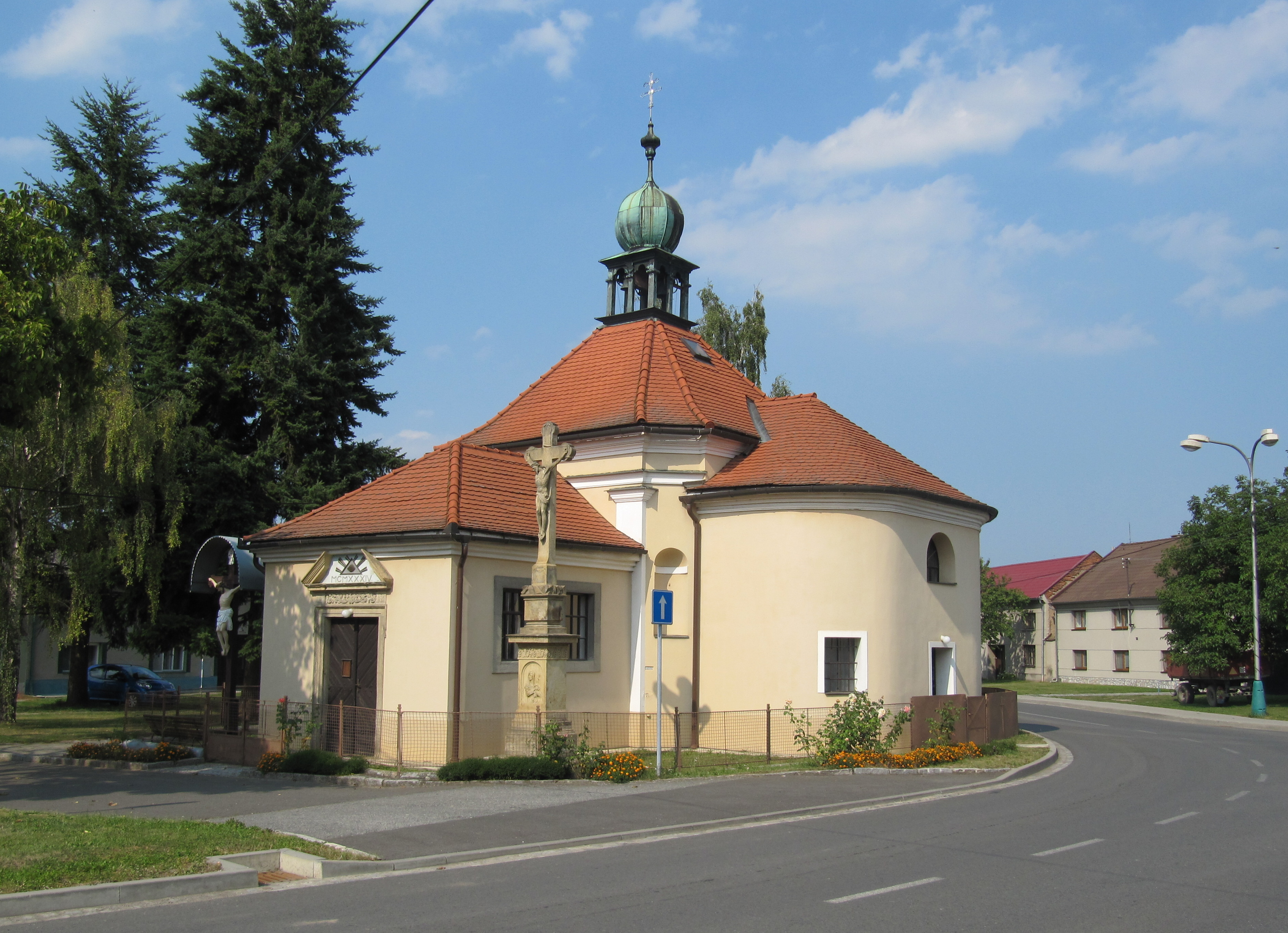
- Chapel of Saints Florian and Isidore

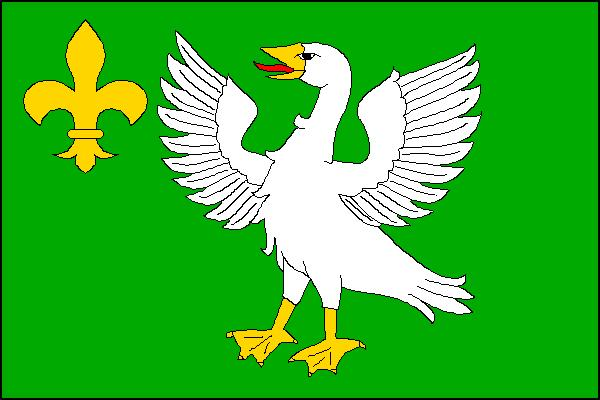
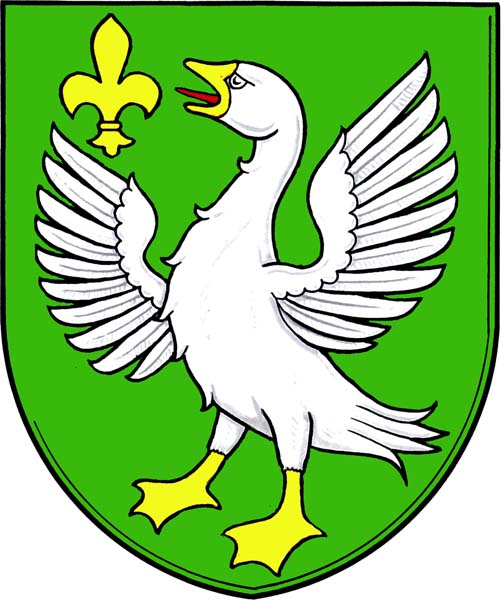
- Flag Coat of arms

- Location in the Czech Republic
- Coordinates: 49°36′7″N 17°4′58″E
- Country: Czech Republic
- Region: Olomouc
- District: Olomouc
- First mentioned: 1141

Area
  - Total: 4.98 km^{2} (1.92 sq mi)
- Elevation: 234 m (768 ft)

Population (2026-01-01)
  - Total: 619
  - Density: 124/km^{2} (322/sq mi)
- Time zone: UTC+1 (CET)
  - Summer (DST): UTC+2 (CEST)
- Postal code: 783 44
- Website: www.loucany.cz

Loučany is a municipality and village in Olomouc District in the Olomouc Region of the Czech Republic. It has about 600 inhabitants.

Loučany lies approximately 12 kilometres (7 mi) west of Olomouc and 200 km (120 mi) east of Prague.

== Demographics ==
Historical population
Year	Pop.	±%
1869	633	—
1880	694	+9.6%
1890	712	+2.6%
1900	752	+5.6%
1910	786	+4.5%
1921	776	−1.3%
1930	791	+1.9%
1950	699	−11.6%
1961	706	+1.0%
1970	703	−0.4%
1980	676	−3.8%
1991	591	−12.6%
2001	602	+1.9%
2011	605	+0.5%
2021	617	+2.0%
Source: Censuses
