= Luběnice =

- Municipality
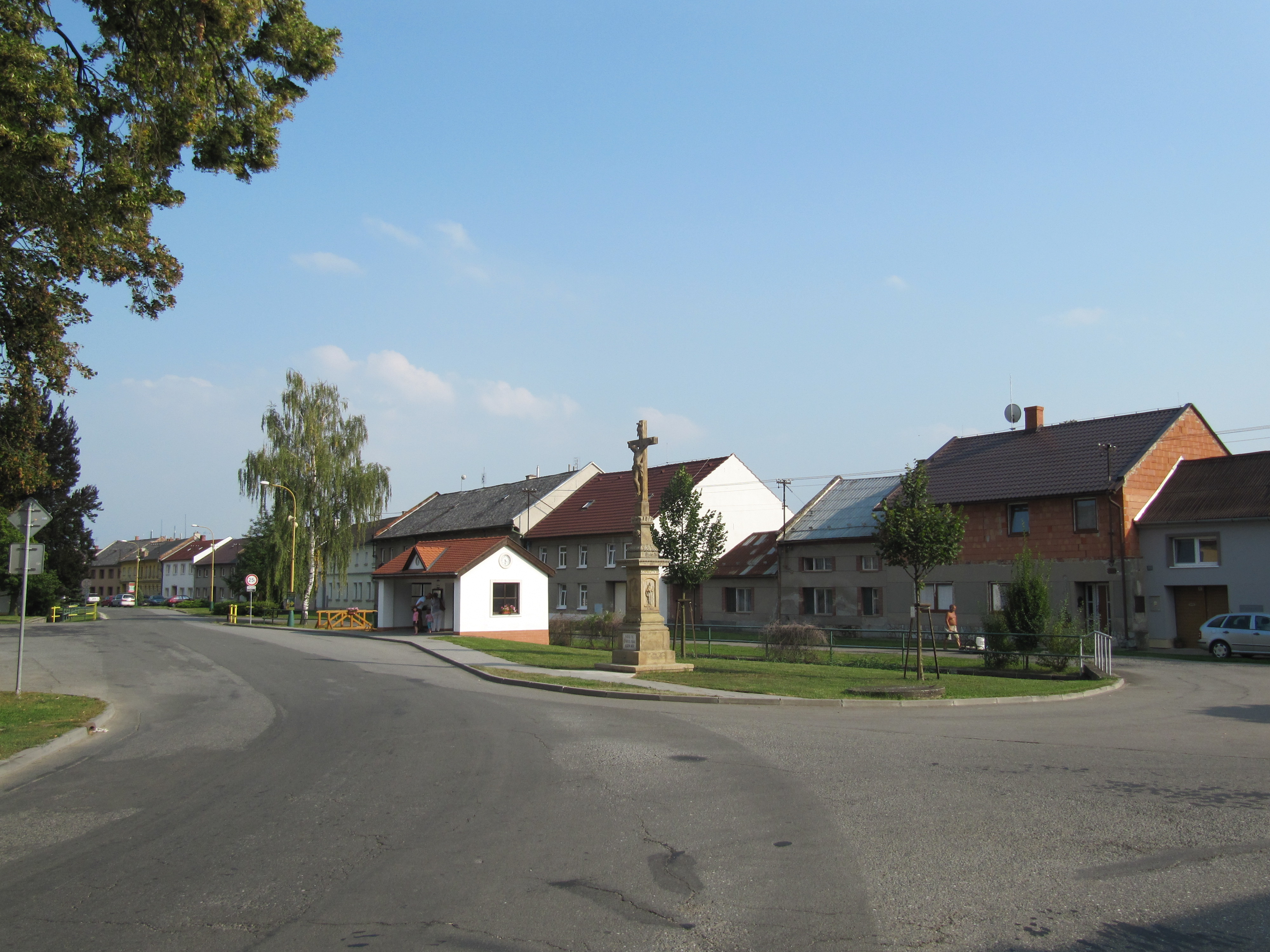
- Centre of Luběnice

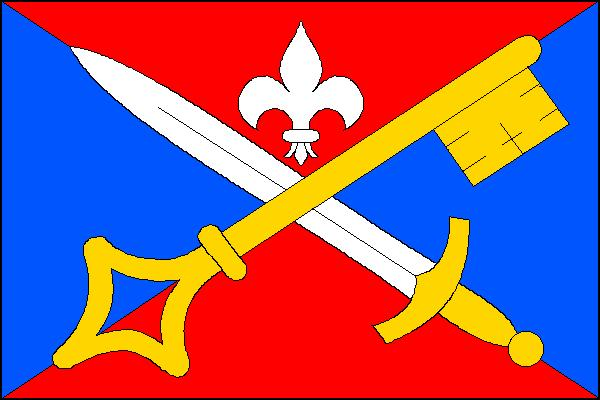
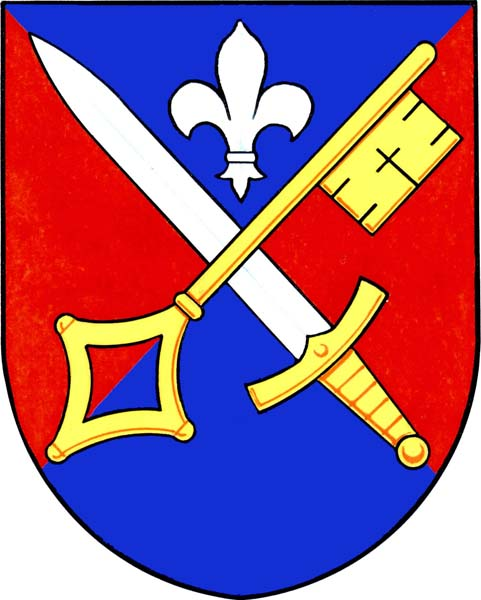
- Flag Coat of arms

- Location in the Czech Republic
- Coordinates: 49°34′34″N 17°7′14″E
- Country: Czech Republic
- Region: Olomouc
- District: Olomouc
- First mentioned: 1297

Area
  - Total: 2.76 km^{2} (1.07 sq mi)
- Elevation: 224 m (735 ft)

Population (2026-01-01)
  - Total: 502
  - Density: 182/km^{2} (471/sq mi)
- Time zone: UTC+1 (CET)
  - Summer (DST): UTC+2 (CEST)
- Postal code: 783 46
- Website: www.lubenice.cz

Luběnice is a municipality and village in Olomouc District in the Olomouc Region of the Czech Republic. It has about 500 inhabitants.

Luběnice lies approximately 10 kilometres (6 mi) west of Olomouc and 203 km (126 mi) east of Prague.

== Demographics ==
Historical population
Year	Pop.	±%
1869	283	—
1880	335	+18.4%
1890	361	+7.8%
1900	421	+16.6%
1910	495	+17.6%
1921	502	+1.4%
1930	483	−3.8%
1950	479	−0.8%
1961	485	+1.3%
1970	479	−1.2%
1980	475	−0.8%
1991	409	−13.9%
2001	406	−0.7%
2011	436	+7.4%
2021	466	+6.9%
Source: Censuses
