= Hněvotín =

- Municipality
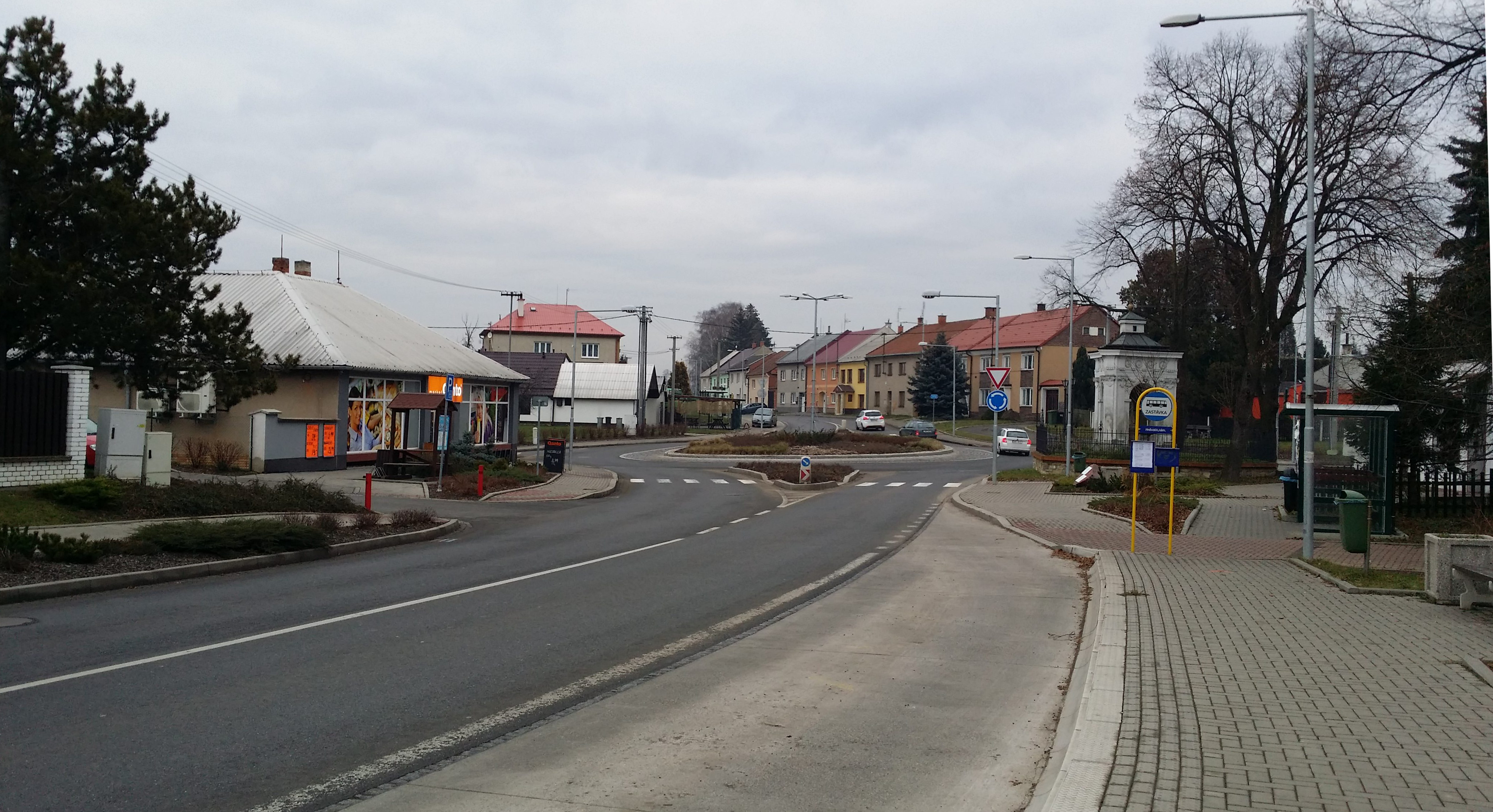
- Centre of Hněvotín

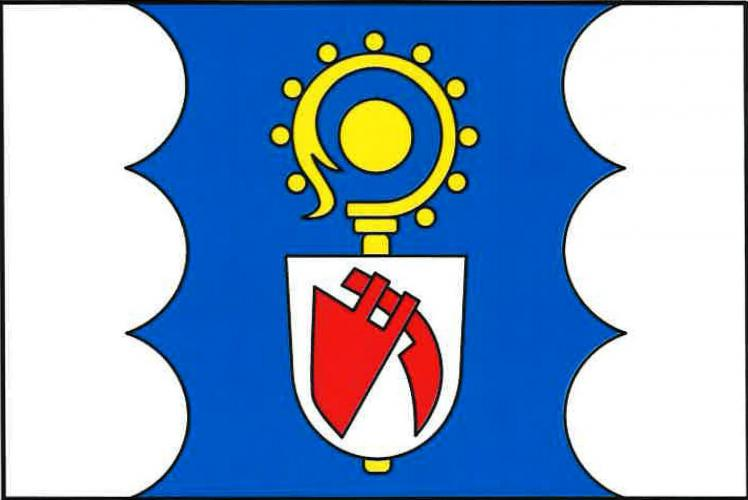
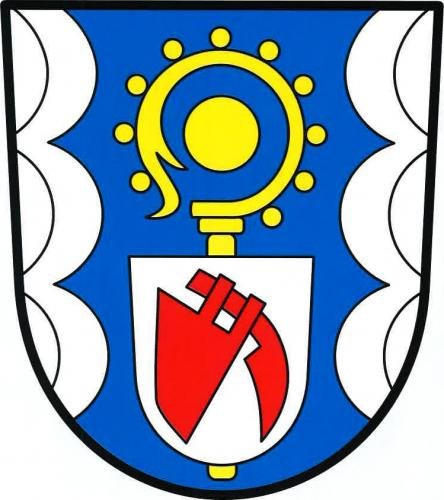
- Flag Coat of arms

- Location in the Czech Republic
- Coordinates: 49°34′19″N 17°10′46″E
- Country: Czech Republic
- Region: Olomouc
- District: Olomouc
- First mentioned: 1078

Area
  - Total: 11.73 km^{2} (4.53 sq mi)
- Elevation: 244 m (801 ft)

Population (2026-01-01)
  - Total: 1,842
  - Density: 157.0/km^{2} (406.7/sq mi)
- Time zone: UTC+1 (CET)
  - Summer (DST): UTC+2 (CEST)
- Postal code: 783 47
- Website: www.hnevotin.cz

Hněvotín (German: Nebotein) is a municipality and village in Olomouc District in the Olomouc Region of the Czech Republic. It has about 1,800 inhabitants.

Hněvotín lies approximately 6 kilometres (4 mi) south-west of Olomouc and 207 km (129 mi) east of Prague.

== Demographics ==
Historical population
Year	Pop.	±%
1869	1,091	—
1880	1,164	+6.7%
1890	1,169	+0.4%
1900	1,272	+8.8%
1910	1,384	+8.8%
1921	1,312	−5.2%
1930	1,502	+14.5%
1950	1,225	−18.4%
1961	1,323	+8.0%
1970	1,161	−12.2%
1980	1,138	−2.0%
1991	1,044	−8.3%
2001	1,127	+8.0%
2011	1,563	+38.7%
2021	1,808	+15.7%
Source: Censuses
