= Těšetice (Olomouc District) =

- Municipality
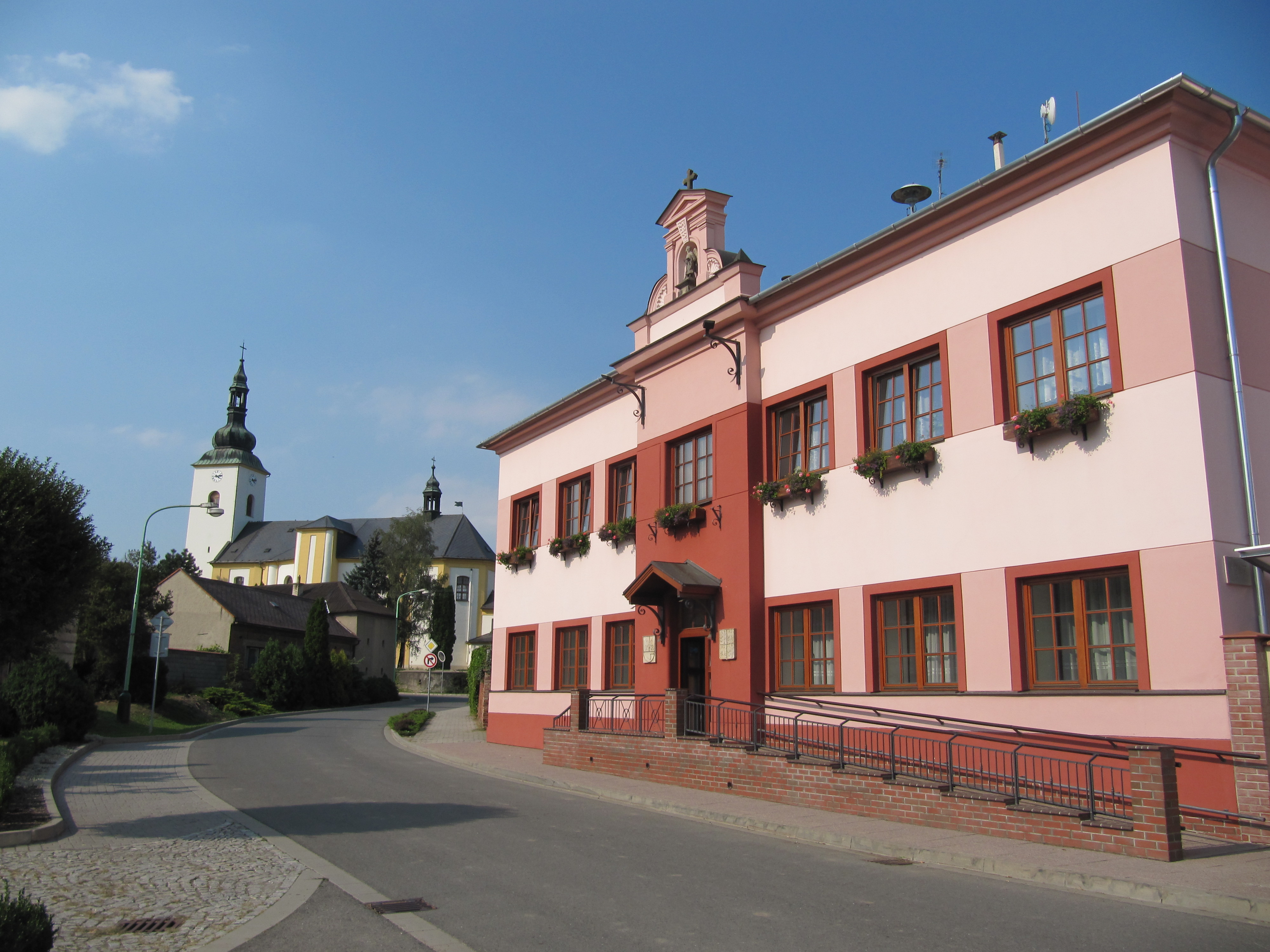
- Municipal office and the Church of Saints Peter and Paul

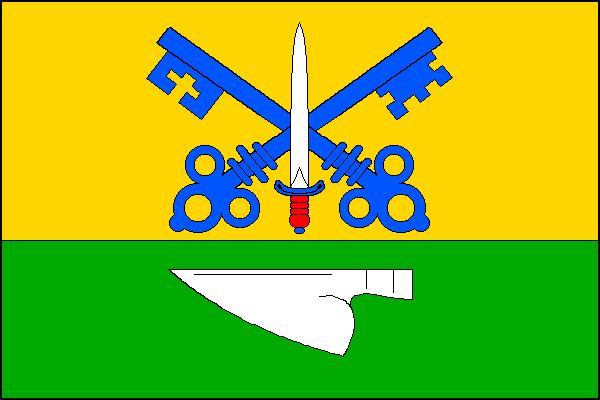
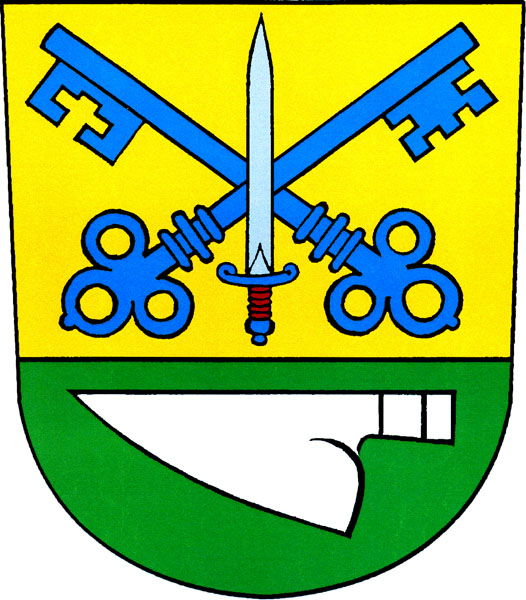
- Flag Coat of arms

- Location in the Czech Republic
- Coordinates: 49°35′35″N 17°7′34″E
- Country: Czech Republic
- Region: Olomouc
- District: Olomouc
- First mentioned: 1078

Area
  - Total: 12.48 km^{2} (4.82 sq mi)
- Elevation: 227 m (745 ft)

Population (2026-01-01)
  - Total: 1,304
  - Density: 104.5/km^{2} (270.6/sq mi)
- Time zone: UTC+1 (CET)
  - Summer (DST): UTC+2 (CEST)
- Postal code: 783 46
- Website: www.obec-tesetice.cz

Těšetice is a municipality and village in Olomouc District in the Olomouc Region of the Czech Republic. It has about 1,300 inhabitants.

Těšetice lies approximately 10 kilometres (6 mi) west of Olomouc and 202 km (126 mi) east of Prague.

== Administrative division ==
Těšetice consists of three municipal parts (in brackets population according to the 2021 census):

- Těšetice (672)
- Rataje (257)
- Vojnice (349)

== Demographics ==
Historical population
| Year | Pop. | ±% |
|---|---|---|
| 1869 | 1,105 | — |
| 1880 | 1,229 | +11.2% |
| 1890 | 1,358 | +10.5% |
| 1900 | 1,308 | −3.7% |
| 1910 | 1,359 | +3.9% |
| 1921 | 1,381 | +1.6% |
| 1930 | 1,439 | +4.2% |
| 1950 | 1,286 | −10.6% |
| 1961 | 1,342 | +4.4% |
| 1970 | 1,331 | −0.8% |
| 1980 | 1,292 | −2.9% |
| 1991 | 1,216 | −5.9% |
| 2001 | 1,221 | +0.4% |
| 2011 | 1,317 | +7.9% |
| 2021 | 1,278 | −3.0% |
Source: Censuses

== Notable people ==
- Ludwig Hatschek (1855–1914), Austrian industrialist
