= Ústín =

- Municipality
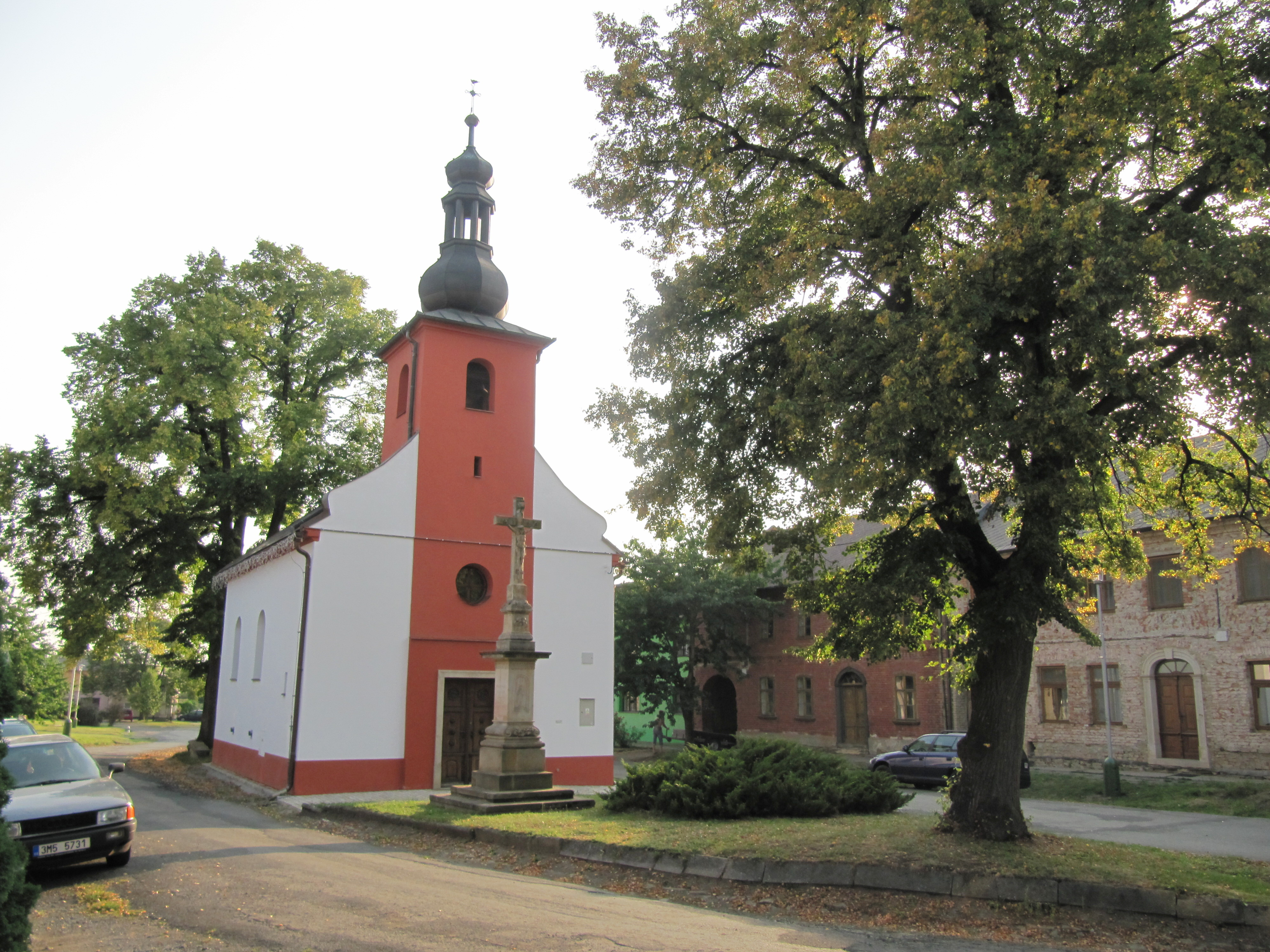
- Chapel of Saints Peter and Paul

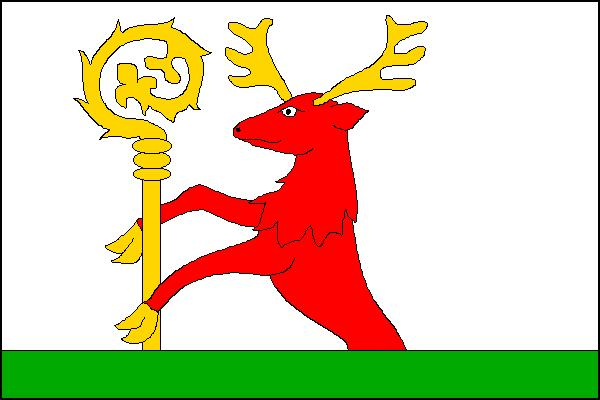
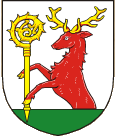
- Flag Coat of arms

- Location in the Czech Republic
- Coordinates: 49°35′13″N 17°9′27″E
- Country: Czech Republic
- Region: Olomouc
- District: Olomouc
- First mentioned: 1078

Area
  - Total: 4.40 km^{2} (1.70 sq mi)
- Elevation: 238 m (781 ft)

Population (2026-01-01)
  - Total: 491
  - Density: 112/km^{2} (289/sq mi)
- Time zone: UTC+1 (CET)
  - Summer (DST): UTC+2 (CEST)
- Postal code: 783 46
- Website: www.ustin.cz

Ústín is a municipality and village in Olomouc District in the Olomouc Region of the Czech Republic. It has about 500 inhabitants.

Ústín lies approximately 7 kilometres (4 mi) west of Olomouc and 205 km (127 mi) east of Prague.

== Demographics ==
Historical population
Year	Pop.	±%
1869	429	—
1880	488	+13.8%
1890	524	+7.4%
1900	543	+3.6%
1910	509	−6.3%
1921	463	−9.0%
1930	469	+1.3%
1950	383	−18.3%
1961	419	+9.4%
1970	410	−2.1%
1980	381	−7.1%
1991	314	−17.6%
2001	350	+11.5%
2011	384	+9.7%
2021	451	+17.4%
Source: Censuses
