= Domašov (disambiguation) =

Domašov may refer to places in the Czech Republic:

- Domašov, a municipality and village in the South Moravian Region
- Domašov nad Bystřicí, a municipality and village in the Olomouc Region
- Domašov u Šternberka, a municipality and village in the Olomouc Region
- Domašov, a village and administrative part of Bělá pod Pradědem in the Olomouc Region
