= Lipinka (Olomouc District) =

- Municipality
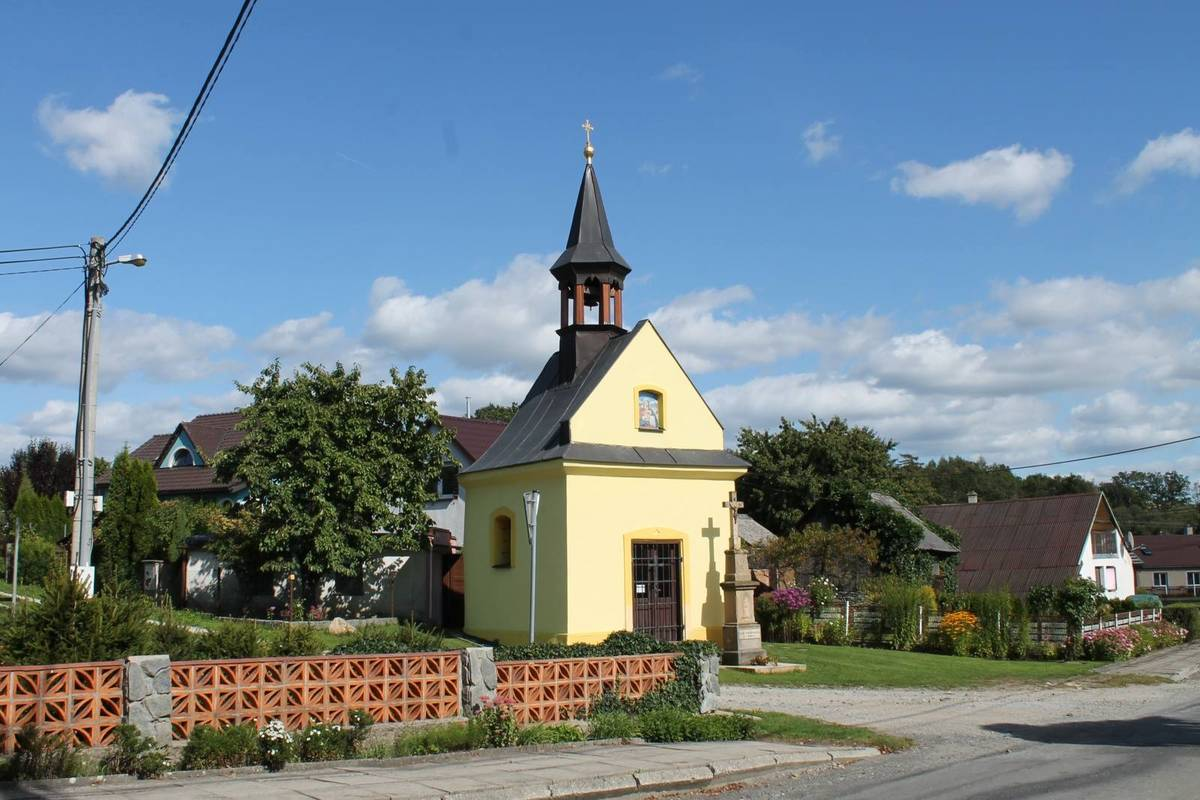
- Chapel of Saint Wenceslaus

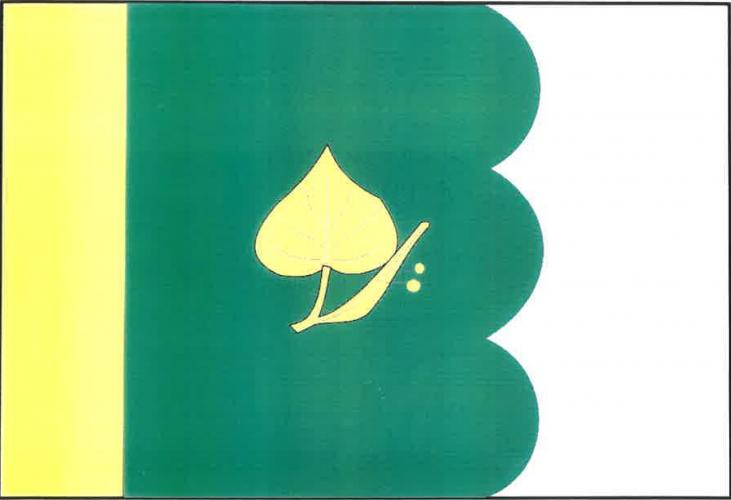
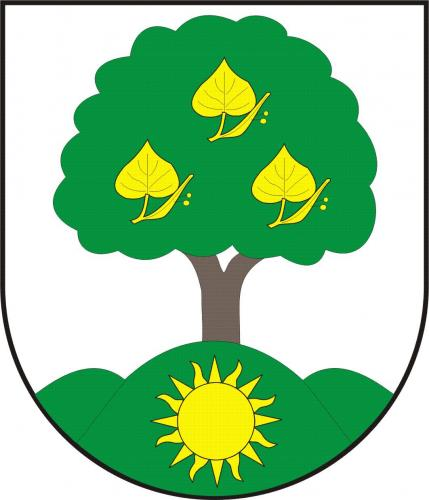
- Flag Coat of arms

- Location in the Czech Republic
- Coordinates: 49°50′16″N 17°3′0″E
- Country: Czech Republic
- Region: Olomouc
- District: Olomouc
- First mentioned: 1450

Area
  - Total: 2.50 km^{2} (0.97 sq mi)
- Elevation: 374 m (1,227 ft)

Population (2026-01-01)
  - Total: 182
  - Density: 72.8/km^{2} (189/sq mi)
- Time zone: UTC+1 (CET)
  - Summer (DST): UTC+2 (CEST)
- Postal code: 783 83
- Website: www.lipinka.cz

Lipinka is a municipality and village in Olomouc District in the Olomouc Region of the Czech Republic. It has about 200 inhabitants.

Lipinka lies approximately 31 kilometres (19 mi) north-west of Olomouc and 191 km (119 mi) east of Prague.

== Demographics ==
Historical population
Year	Pop.	±%
1869	442	—
1880	475	+7.5%
1890	441	−7.2%
1900	427	−3.2%
1910	440	+3.0%
1921	391	−11.1%
1930	377	−3.6%
1950	261	−30.8%
1961	305	+16.9%
1970	318	+4.3%
1980	273	−14.2%
1991	218	−20.1%
2001	212	−2.8%
2011	198	−6.6%
2021	184	−7.1%
Source: Censuses
