= Hlušovice =

- Municipality
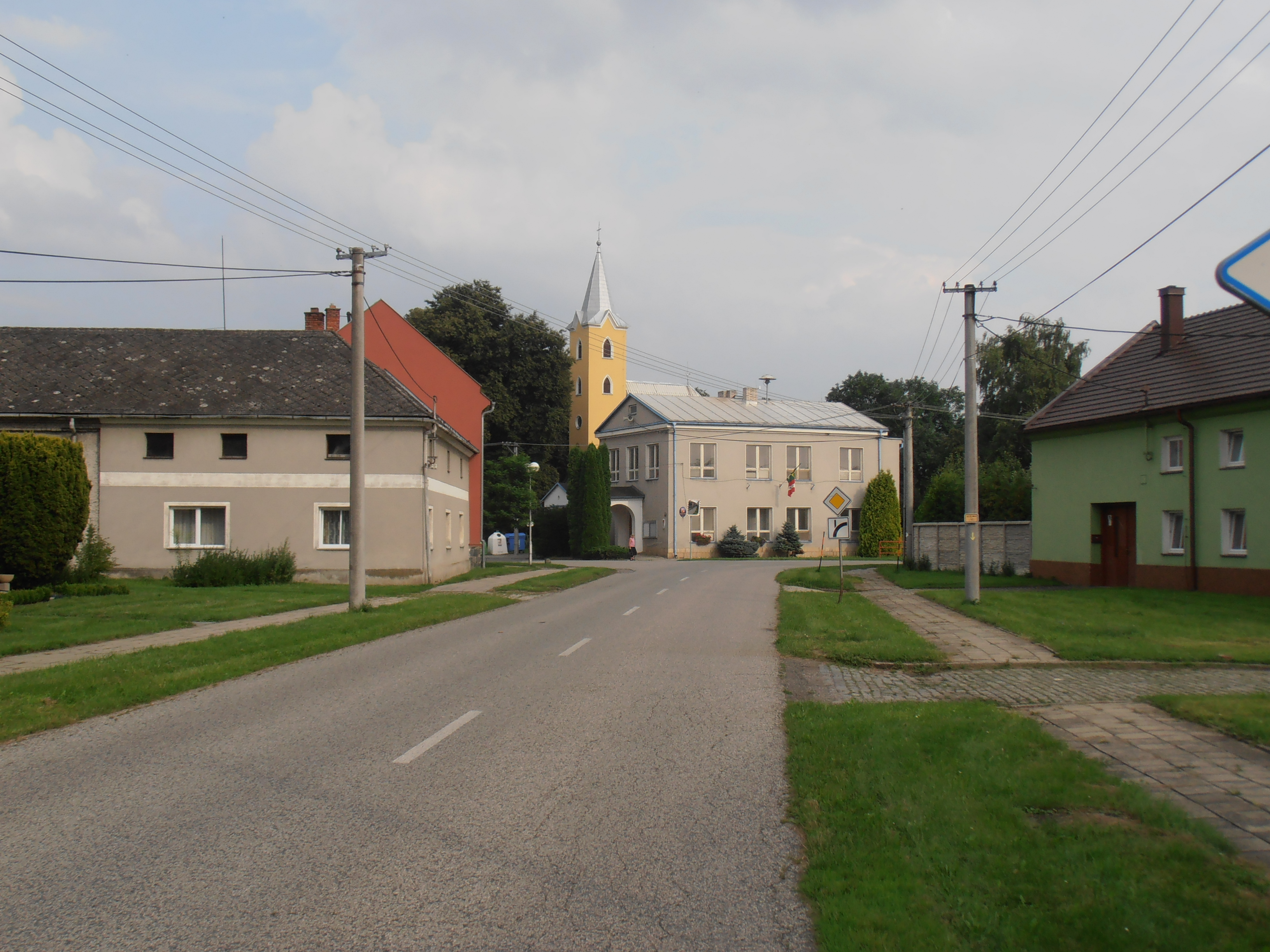
- Centre of Hlušovice with the municipal office

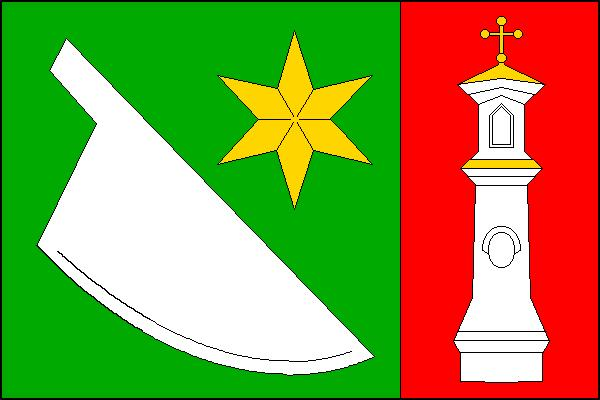
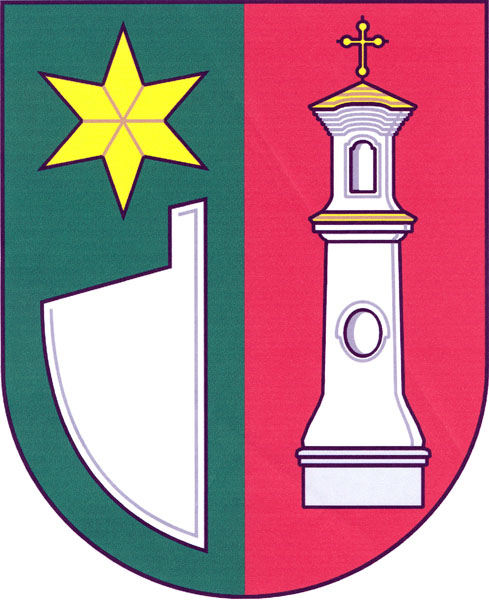
- Flag Coat of arms

- Location in the Czech Republic
- Coordinates: 49°38′17″N 17°16′39″E
- Country: Czech Republic
- Region: Olomouc
- District: Olomouc
- First mentioned: 1271

Area
  - Total: 4.25 km^{2} (1.64 sq mi)
- Elevation: 217 m (712 ft)

Population (2026-01-01)
  - Total: 1,077
  - Density: 253/km^{2} (656/sq mi)
- Time zone: UTC+1 (CET)
  - Summer (DST): UTC+2 (CEST)
- Postal code: 783 14
- Website: hlusovice.eu

Hlušovice is a municipality and village in Olomouc District in the Olomouc Region of the Czech Republic. It has about 1,100 inhabitants.

Hlušovice lies approximately 6 kilometres (4 mi) north of Olomouc and 212 km (132 mi) east of Prague.

== Demographics ==
Historical population
Year	Pop.	±%
1869	235	—
1880	252	+7.2%
1890	234	−7.1%
1900	216	−7.7%
1910	247	+14.4%
1921	286	+15.8%
1930	339	+18.5%
1950	307	−9.4%
1961	325	+5.9%
1970	311	−4.3%
1980	290	−6.8%
1991	270	−6.9%
2001	295	+9.3%
2011	807	+173.6%
2021	1,018	+26.1%
Source: Censuses
