= Olomouc District =

Olomouc District Okres Olomouc
- District
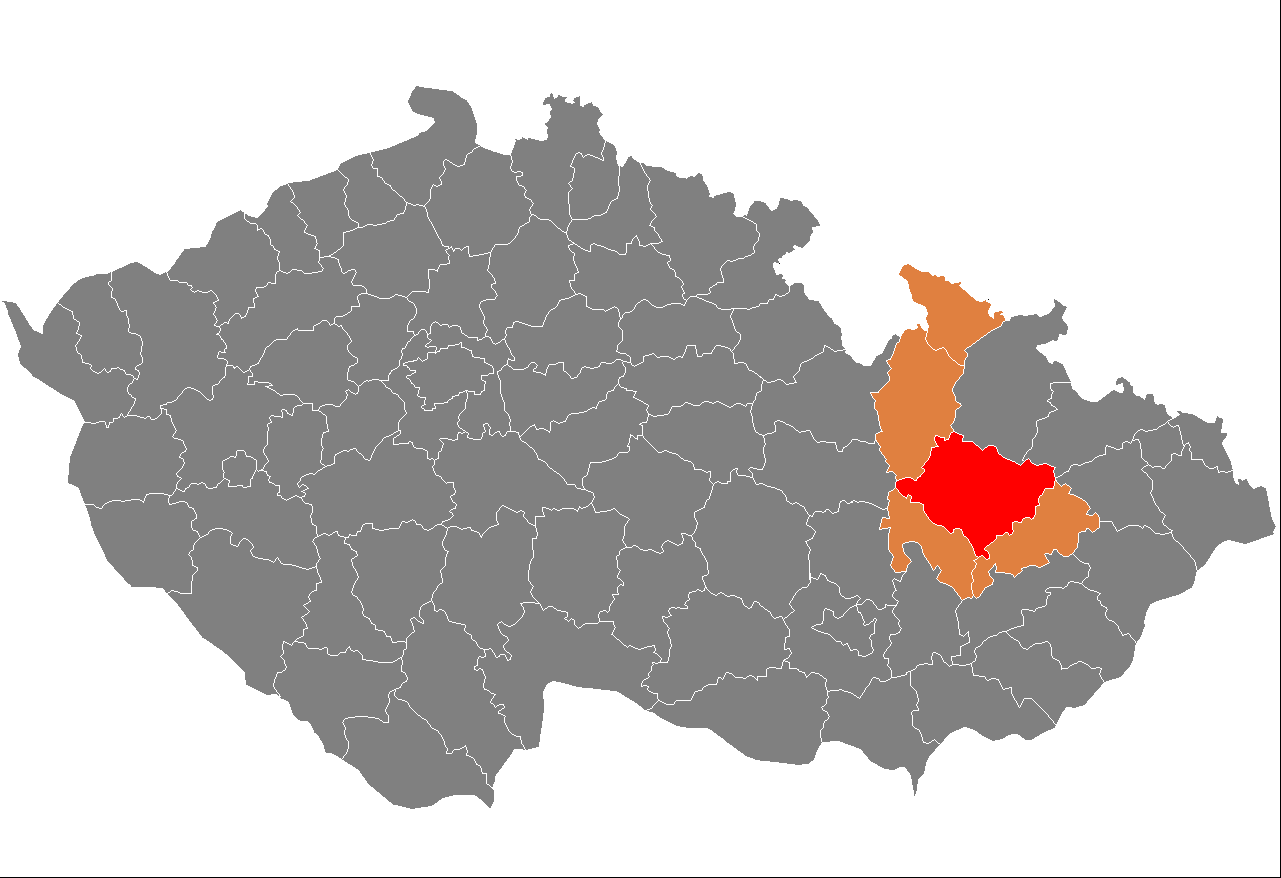
- Location in the Olomouc Region within the Czech Republic
- Coordinates: 49°41′N 17°16′E
- Country: Czech Republic
- Region: Olomouc
- Capital: Olomouc

Area
  - Total: 1,608.04 km^{2} (620.87 sq mi)

Population (2026)
  - Total: 240,779
  - Density: 149.734/km^{2} (387.810/sq mi)
- Time zone: UTC+1 (CET)
  - Summer (DST): UTC+2 (CEST)
- Municipalities: 97
- * Cities and towns: 7
- * Market towns: 3

Olomouc District (Czech: okres Olomouc) is a district in the Olomouc Region of the Czech Republic. Its capital is the city of Olomouc.

== Administrative division ==
Olomouc District is divided into four administrative districts of municipalities with extended competence: Olomouc, Litovel, Šternberk and Uničov.

=== List of municipalities ===
Cities and towns are marked in bold and market towns in italics:

Babice - Bělkovice-Lašťany - Bílá Lhota - Bílsko - Blatec - Bohuňovice - Bouzov - Bukovany - Bystročice - Bystrovany - Červenka - Charváty - Cholina - Daskabát - Dlouhá Loučka - Dolany - Doloplazy - Domašov nad Bystřicí - Domašov u Šternberka - Drahanovice - Dub nad Moravou - Dubčany - Grygov - Haňovice - Hlásnice - Hlubočky - Hlušovice - Hněvotín - Hnojice - Horka nad Moravou - Horní Loděnice - Hraničné Petrovice - Huzová - Jívová - Komárov - Kozlov - Kožušany-Tážaly - Krčmaň - Křelov-Břuchotín - Liboš - Lipina - Lipinka - Litovel - Loučany - Loučka - Luběnice - Luká - Lutín - Lužice - Majetín - Medlov - Měrotín - Město Libavá - Mladeč - Mladějovice - Moravský Beroun - Mrsklesy - Mutkov - Náklo - Náměšť na Hané - Norberčany - Nová Hradečná - Olbramice - Olomouc - Paseka - Pňovice - Přáslavice - Příkazy - Řídeč - Samotišky - Senice na Hané - Senička - Skrbeň - Slatinice - Slavětín - Štěpánov - Šternberk - Strukov - Střeň - Suchonice - Svésedlice - Štarnov - Šumvald - Těšetice - Tovéř - Troubelice - Tršice - Újezd - Uničov - Ústín - Velká Bystřice - Velký Týnec - Velký Újezd - Věrovany - Vilémov - Želechovice - Žerotín

Part of the district area belongs to Libavá Military Training Area.

== Geography ==
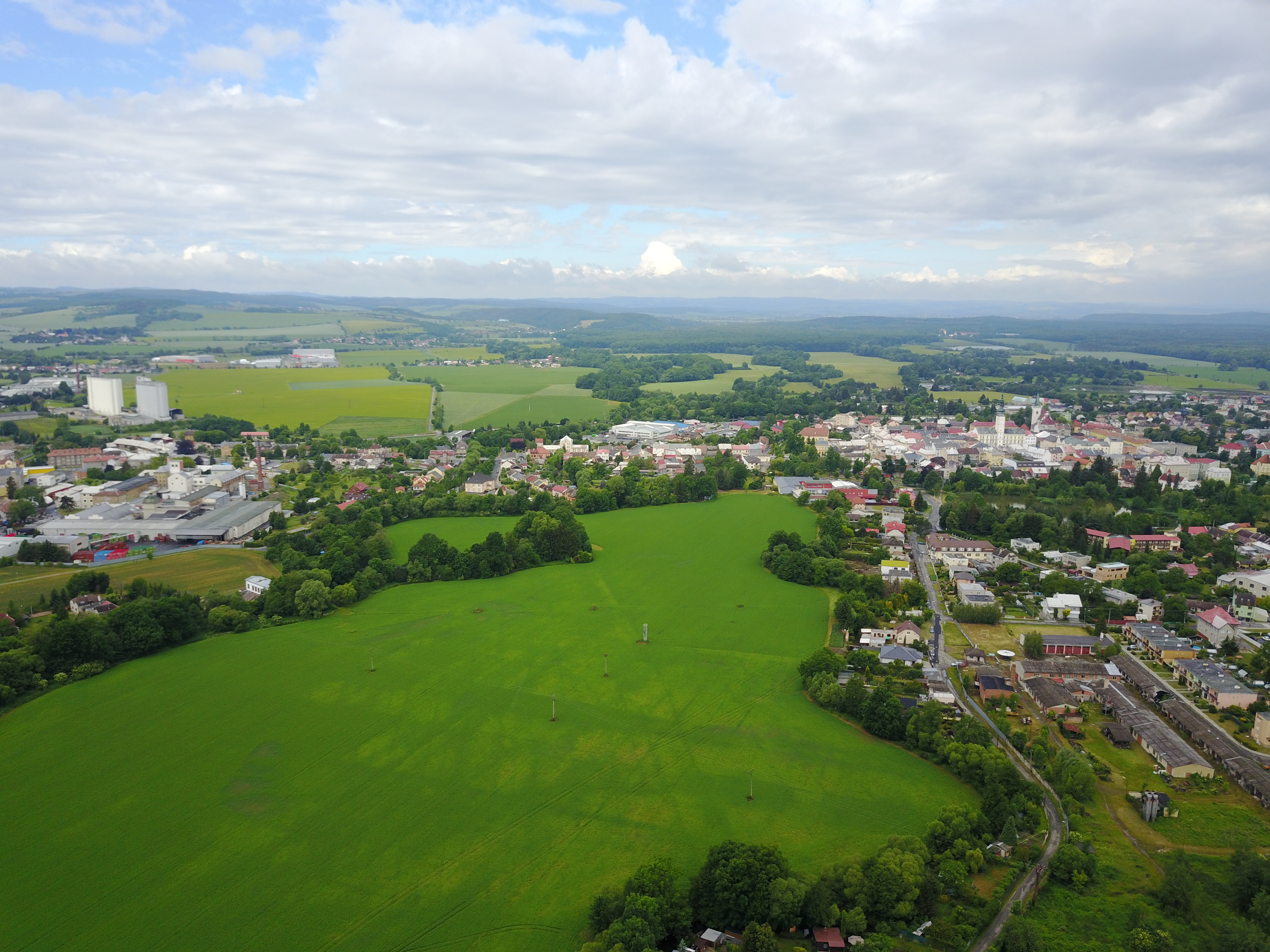
Litovel and surrounding landscape

The landscape is varied and rugged. The terrain is flat in the west and hilly in the east. The territory extends into five geomorphological mesoregions: Nízký Jeseník (east), Upper Morava Valley (centre), Zábřeh Highlands (west), Hanušovice Highlands (a small part in the north), and Mohelnice Depression (a negligible area in the north). The highest point of the district is the hill Fidlův kopec in Libavá Military Training Area with an elevation of 680 m (2,230 ft), the lowest point is the river bed of the Morava in Věrovany at 194 m (636 ft).

From the total district area of 1,608.0 km^{2} (620.9 sq mi), agricultural land occupies 857.9 km^{2} (331.2 sq mi), forests occupy 499.0 km^{2} (192.7 sq mi), and water area occupies 17.3 km^{2} (6.7 sq mi). Forests cover 31.0% of the district's area.

The most important river is the Morava, which flows through the territory from north to south. Is largest tributary in the district is the Bystřice. The Oder originates here and flows through the uninhabited part of the district to the east. Bodies of water are concentrated along the Morava, otherwise there are not many of them here. The largest body of water is Náklo; an artificial lake created by flooding a gravel quarry with an area of about 100 ha (250 acres).

Almost the entire Litovelské Pomoraví Protected Landscape Area lies within the district.

== Demographics ==
Historical population

Year	Pop.	±%
1869	162,655	—
1880	178,892	+10.0%
1890	188,357	+5.3%
1900	200,728	+6.6%
1910	209,018	+4.1%

Year	Pop.	±%
1921	213,262	+2.0%
1930	227,778	+6.8%
1950	190,885	−16.2%
1961	203,460	+6.6%
1970	213,628	+5.0%

Year	Pop.	±%
1980	226,179	+5.9%
1991	228,050	+0.8%
2001	229,119	+0.5%
2011	230,283	+0.5%
2021	237,291	+3.0%

Source: Censuses

=== Most populous municipalities ===
Name	Population	Area (km^{2})
Olomouc	105,297	103
Šternberk	13,207	49
Uničov	11,060	48
Litovel	9,448	46
Hlubočky	4,176	22
Velká Bystřice	3,736	9
Štěpánov	3,489	27
Velký Týnec	3,211	21
Lutín	3,076	8
Dolany	2,876	24

== Economy ==
The largest employers with headquarters in Olomouc District and at least 1,000 employees are:

Economic entity	Location	Number of employees	Main activity
Olomouc University Hospital	Olomouc	5,000–9,999	Health care
Palacký University Olomouc	Olomouc	5,000–9,999	Education
Regional Police Directorate of the Olomouc Region	Olomouc	2,000–2,499	Public order and safety activities
Bartoň a Partner	Olomouc	1,500–1,999	Cleaning of buildings
Forcorp Group	Olomouc	1,500–1,999	Private security activities
Miele technika	Uničov	1,500–1,999	Manufacture of electric domestic appliances
Českomoravská Bezpečnostní Agentura	Bohuňovice	1,000–1,499	Private security activities
City of Olomouc	Olomouc	1,000–1,499	Public administration

== Transport ==
The D35 motorway (part of the European route E442) runs across the district. The D46 motorway (European route E462) separates from it in Olomouc and leads to Vyškov.

== Sights ==
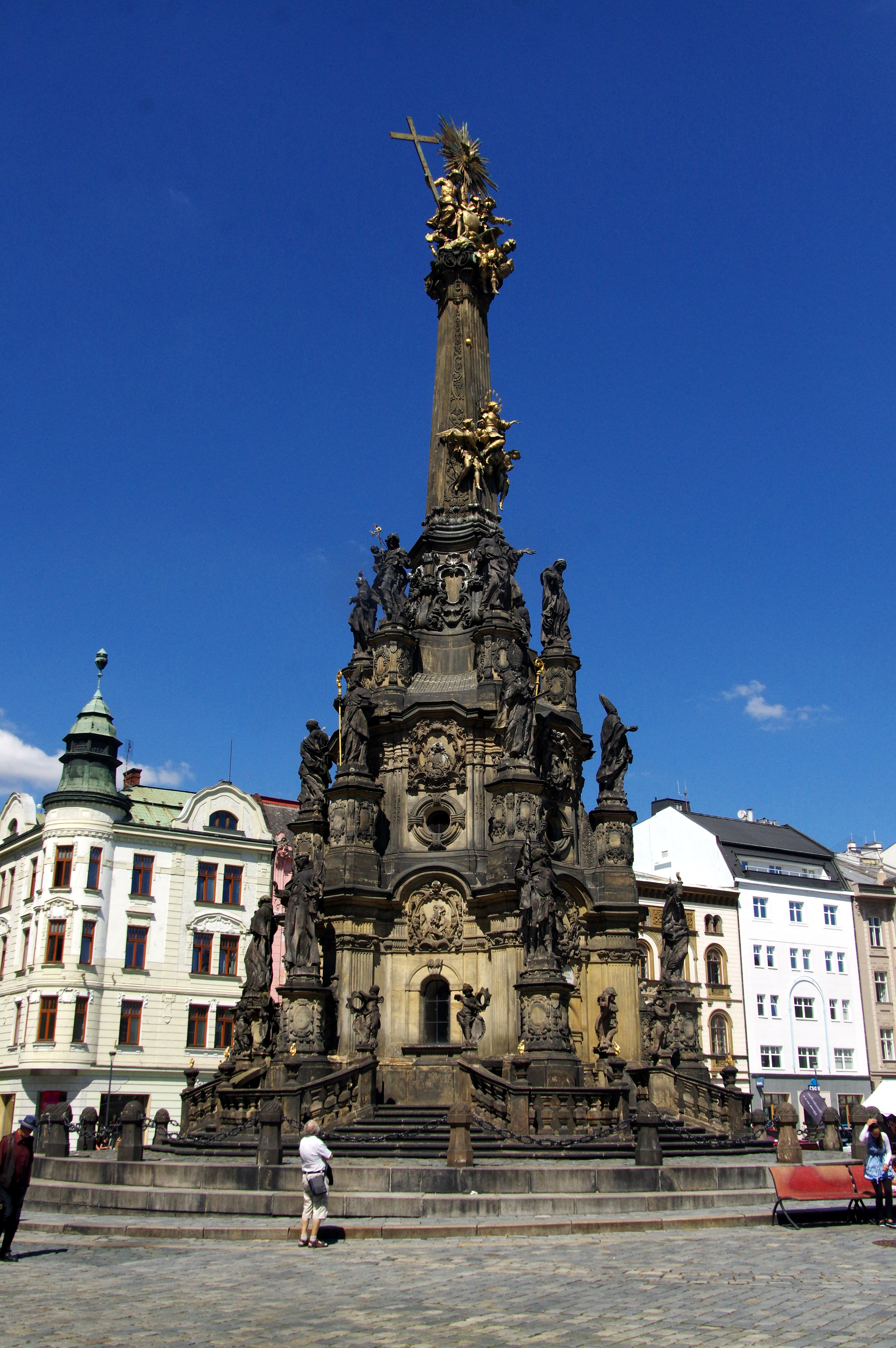
Holy Trinity Column in Olomouc

The Holy Trinity Column in Olomouc was designated a UNESCO World Heritage Site in 2000 because it is the most outstanding example of a type of monument specific to central Europe.

The most important monuments in the district, protected as national cultural monuments, are:

- Olomouc Castle
- Memorial to the victims of the World War II in Javoříčko
- Hradisko Monastery
- Church of Saint Maurice in Olomouc
- Set of baroque fountains and columns in Olomouc
- Bouzov Castle
- Šternberk Castle
- Villa Primavesi
- Basilica of the Visitation of the Virgin Mary in Olomouc-Svatý kopeček

The best-preserved settlements, protected as monument reservations and monument zones, are:

- Olomouc (monument reservation)
- Příkazy (monument reservation)
- Litovel
- Šternberk
- Uničov
- Rataje
- Senička

Seven of the ten most visited tourist destinations of the Olomouc Region are located in Olomouc District, and six of them directly in the city of Olomouc. The most visited tourist destinations are the Olomouc Zoo, Aquapark Olomouc, Collection greenhouses, botanical garden and rosarium in Olomouc, Bouzov Castle, the museum Pevnost poznání in Olomouc, Museum of Modern Art Olomouc, and the tower of the Church of St. Maurice in Olomouc.
