= Nová Hradečná =

- Municipality
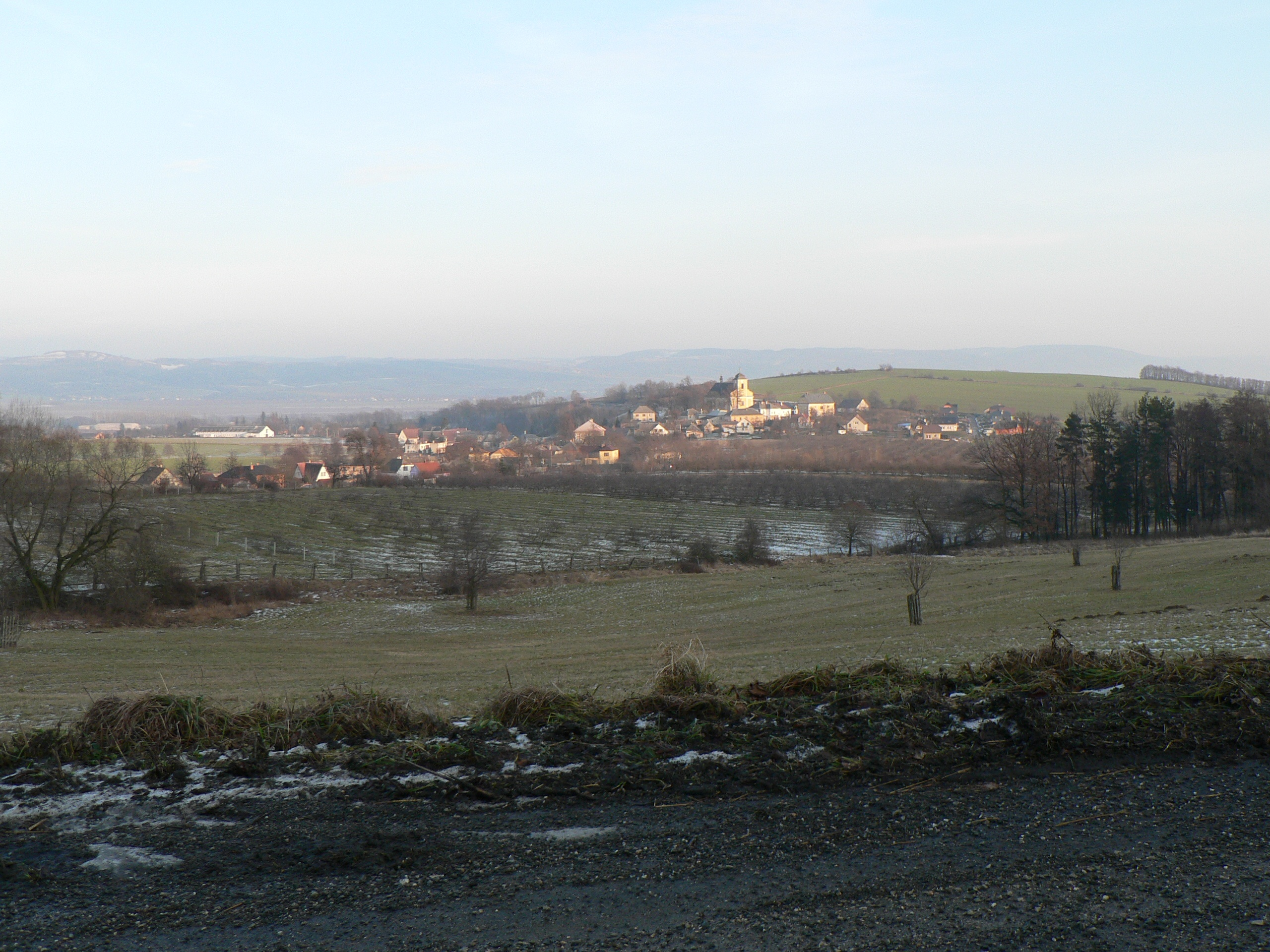
- General view

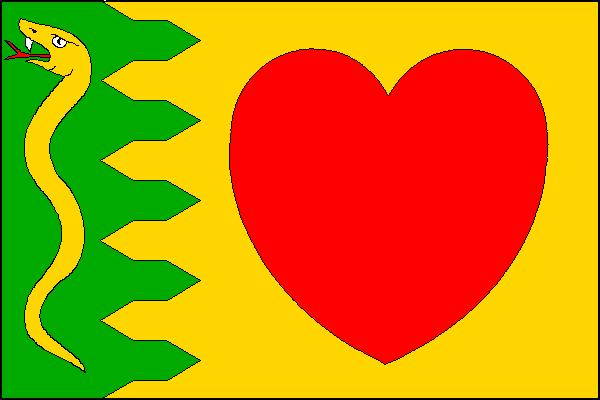
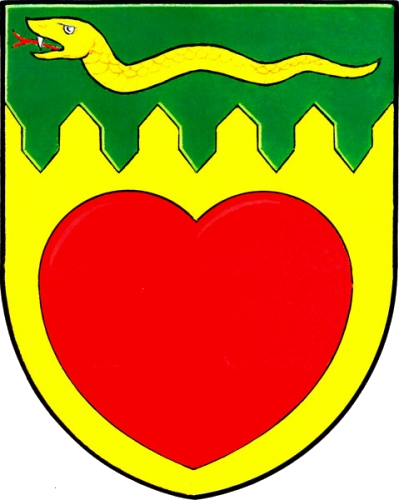
- Flag Coat of arms

- Location in the Czech Republic
- Coordinates: 49°50′4″N 17°4′39″E
- Country: Czech Republic
- Region: Olomouc
- District: Olomouc
- First mentioned: 1344

Area
  - Total: 11.40 km^{2} (4.40 sq mi)
- Elevation: 275 m (902 ft)

Population (2026-01-01)
  - Total: 748
  - Density: 65.6/km^{2} (170/sq mi)
- Time zone: UTC+1 (CET)
  - Summer (DST): UTC+2 (CEST)
- Postal code: 783 84
- Website: www.novahradecna.cz

Nová Hradečná is a municipality and village in Olomouc District in the Olomouc Region of the Czech Republic. It has about 700 inhabitants.

Nová Hradečná lies approximately 31 kilometres (19 mi) north-west of Olomouc and 193 km (120 mi) east of Prague.

== Demographics ==
Historical population
| Year | Pop. | ±% |
|---|---|---|
| 1869 | 1,032 | — |
| 1880 | 1,045 | +1.3% |
| 1890 | 1,022 | −2.2% |
| 1900 | 1,052 | +2.9% |
| 1910 | 1,001 | −4.8% |
| 1921 | 949 | −5.2% |
| 1930 | 1,012 | +6.6% |
| 1950 | 726 | −28.3% |
| 1961 | 811 | +11.7% |
| 1970 | 771 | −4.9% |
| 1980 | 775 | +0.5% |
| 1991 | 746 | −3.7% |
| 2001 | 762 | +2.1% |
| 2011 | 787 | +3.3% |
| 2021 | 711 | −9.7% |
Source: Censuses
