= Loučka (Olomouc District) =

- Municipality
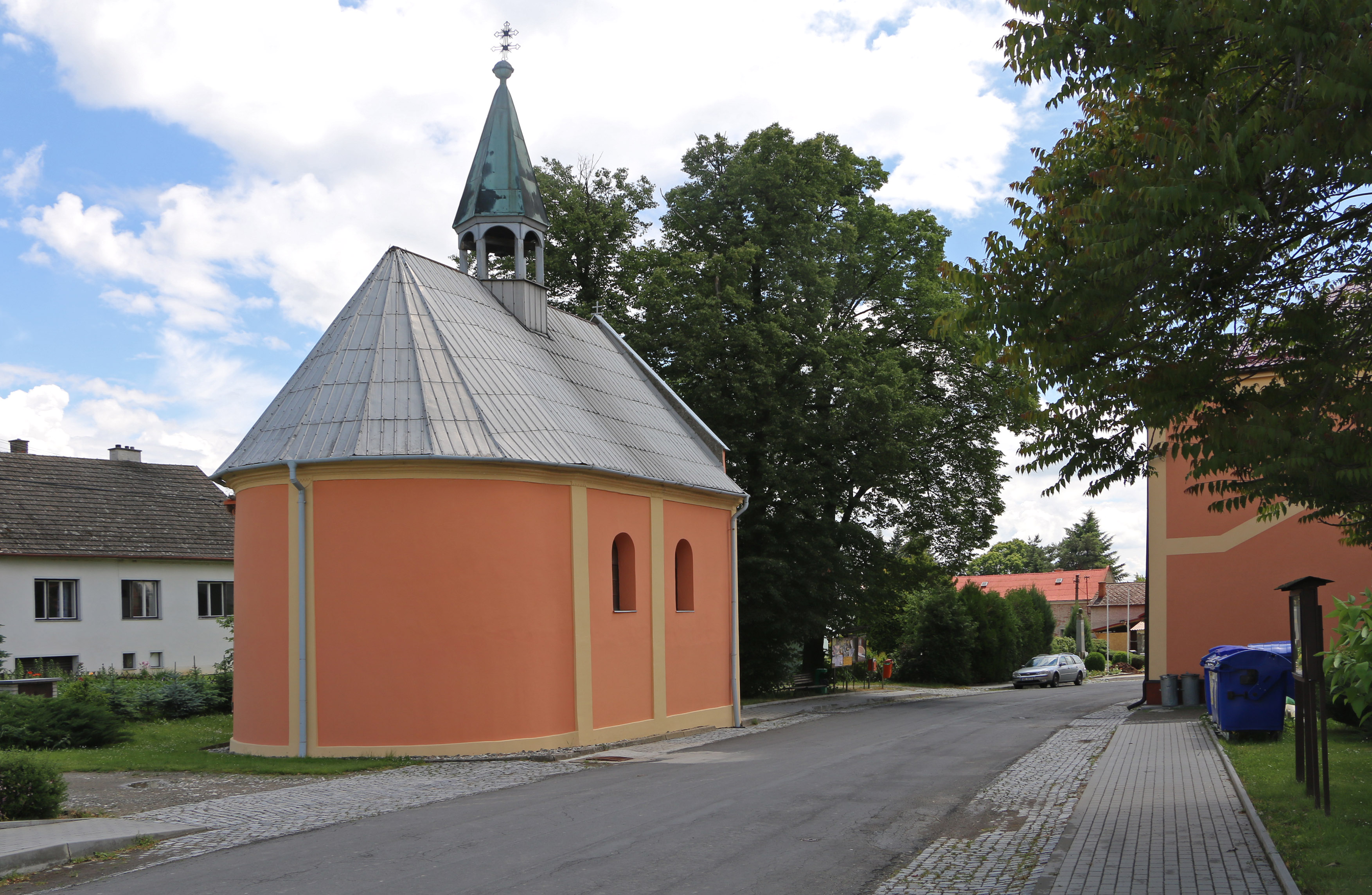
- Chapel of Saint John the Baptist

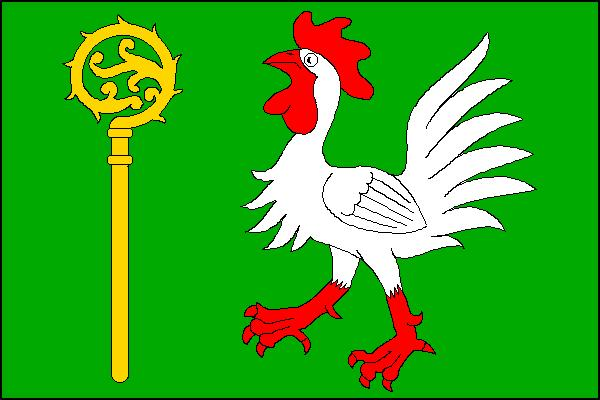
- Flag Coat of arms

- Location in the Czech Republic
- Coordinates: 49°39′25″N 17°0′40″E
- Country: Czech Republic
- Region: Olomouc
- District: Olomouc
- First mentioned: 1300

Area
  - Total: 6.20 km^{2} (2.39 sq mi)
- Elevation: 360 m (1,180 ft)

Population (2026-01-01)
  - Total: 215
  - Density: 34.7/km^{2} (89.8/sq mi)
- Time zone: UTC+1 (CET)
  - Summer (DST): UTC+2 (CEST)
- Postal code: 783 22
- Website: www.obec-loucka.cz

Loučka is a municipality and village in Olomouc District in the Olomouc Region of the Czech Republic. It has about 200 inhabitants.

Loučka lies approximately 20 kilometres (12 mi) west of Olomouc and 191 km (119 mi) east of Prague.

== Demographics ==
Historical population
Year	Pop.	±%
1869	428	—
1880	439	+2.6%
1890	435	−0.9%
1900	466	+7.1%
1910	496	+6.4%
1921	488	−1.6%
1930	464	−4.9%
1950	364	−21.6%
1961	350	−3.8%
1970	331	−5.4%
1980	271	−18.1%
1991	227	−16.2%
2001	219	−3.5%
2011	184	−16.0%
2021	196	+6.5%
Source: Censuses
