= Troubelice =

- Municipality
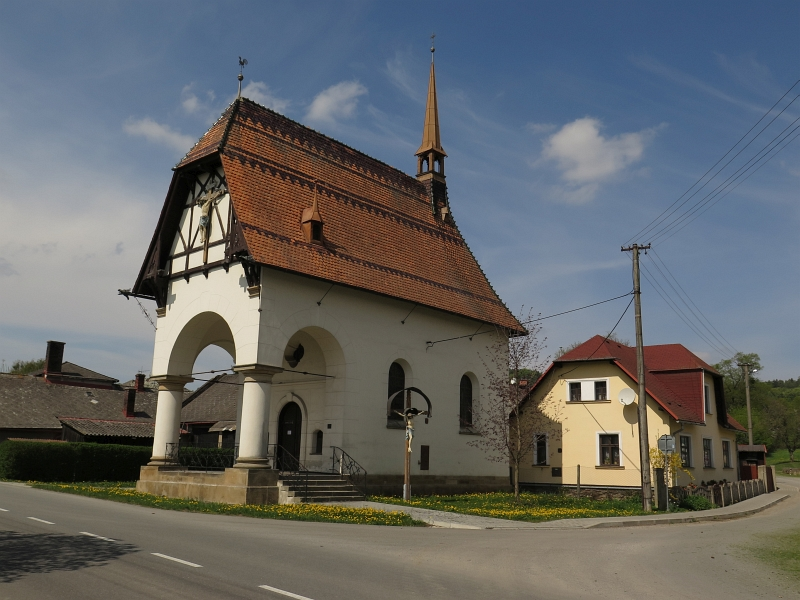
- Chapel of Saint Anthony of Padua

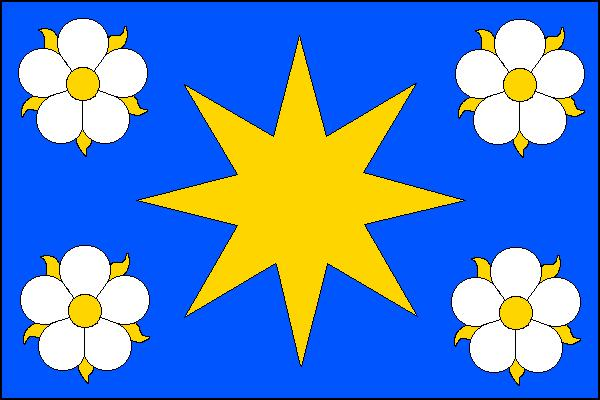
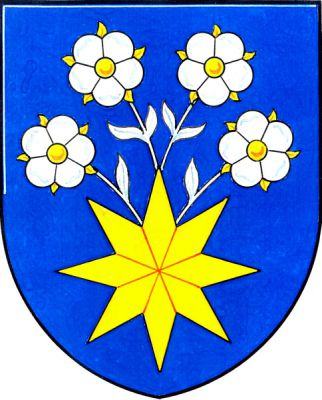
- Flag Coat of arms

- Location in the Czech Republic
- Coordinates: 49°49′2″N 17°4′52″E
- Country: Czech Republic
- Region: Olomouc
- District: Olomouc
- First mentioned: 1334

Area
  - Total: 18.85 km^{2} (7.28 sq mi)
- Elevation: 250 m (820 ft)

Population (2026-01-01)
  - Total: 1,840
  - Density: 97.6/km^{2} (253/sq mi)
- Time zone: UTC+1 (CET)
  - Summer (DST): UTC+2 (CEST)
- Postal code: 783 83
- Website: www.troubelice.cz

Troubelice is a municipality and village in Olomouc District in the Olomouc Region of the Czech Republic. It has about 1,800 inhabitants.

Troubelice lies approximately 29 kilometres (18 mi) north-west of Olomouc and 193 km (120 mi) east of Prague.

== Administrative division ==
Troubelice consists of four municipal parts (in brackets population according to the 2021 census):

- Troubelice (1,256)
- Dědinka (56)
- Lazce (236)
- Pískov (198)

== Demographics ==
Historical population
Year	Pop.	±%
1869	1,794	—
1880	1,951	+8.8%
1890	1,956	+0.3%
1900	1,947	−0.5%
1910	1,936	−0.6%
1921	1,996	+3.1%
1930	1,954	−2.1%
1950	1,505	−23.0%
1961	1,829	+21.5%
1970	1,783	−2.5%
1980	1,779	−0.2%
1991	1,716	−3.5%
2001	1,799	+4.8%
2011	1,840	+2.3%
2021	1,746	−5.1%
Source: Censuses
