= Cholina =

- Municipality
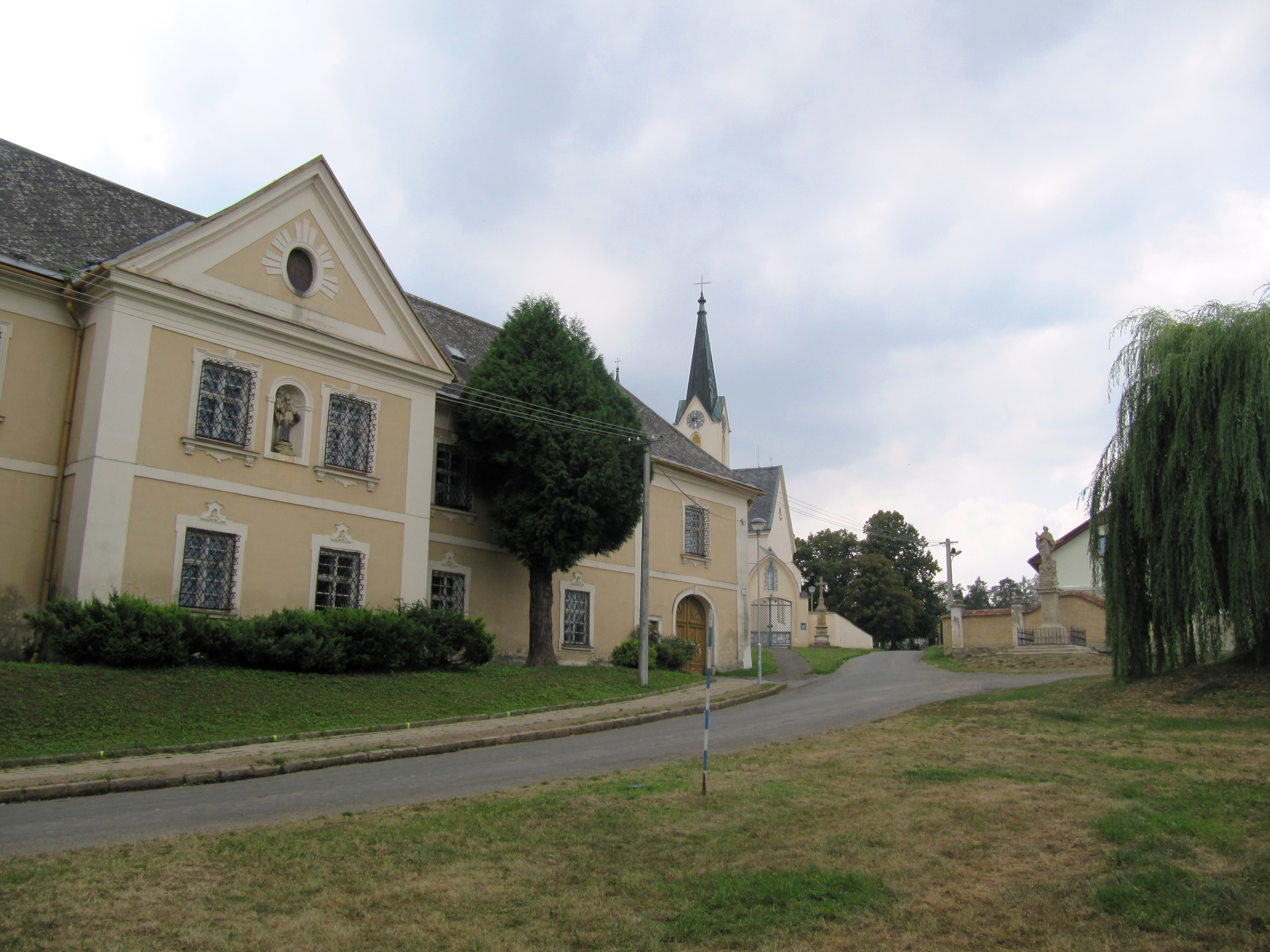
- Rectory and Church of the Assumption of the Virgin Mary

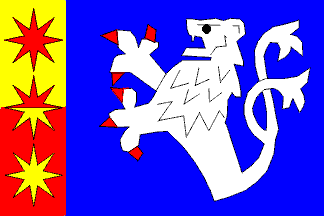
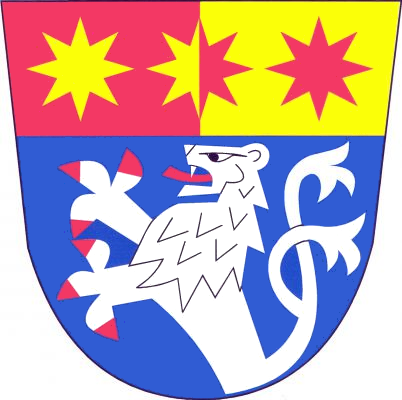
- Flag Coat of arms

- Location in the Czech Republic
- Coordinates: 49°39′22″N 17°3′16″E
- Country: Czech Republic
- Region: Olomouc
- District: Olomouc
- First mentioned: 1141

Area
  - Total: 8.99 km^{2} (3.47 sq mi)
- Elevation: 262 m (860 ft)

Population (2026-01-01)
  - Total: 721
  - Density: 80.2/km^{2} (208/sq mi)
- Time zone: UTC+1 (CET)
  - Summer (DST): UTC+2 (CEST)
- Postal code: 783 22
- Website: www.obeccholina.cz

Cholina (German: Köllein) is a municipality and village in Olomouc District in the Olomouc Region of the Czech Republic. It has about 700 inhabitants.

Cholina lies approximately 16 kilometres (10 mi) north-west of Olomouc and 195 km (121 mi) east of Prague.

== Demographics ==
Historical population
Year	Pop.	±%
1869	764	—
1880	757	−0.9%
1890	834	+10.2%
1900	855	+2.5%
1910	860	+0.6%
1921	903	+5.0%
1930	845	−6.4%
1950	755	−10.7%
1961	750	−0.7%
1970	710	−5.3%
1980	716	+0.8%
1991	660	−7.8%
2001	646	−2.1%
2011	709	+9.8%
2021	693	−2.3%
Source: Censuses
