= Mladějovice =

- Municipality
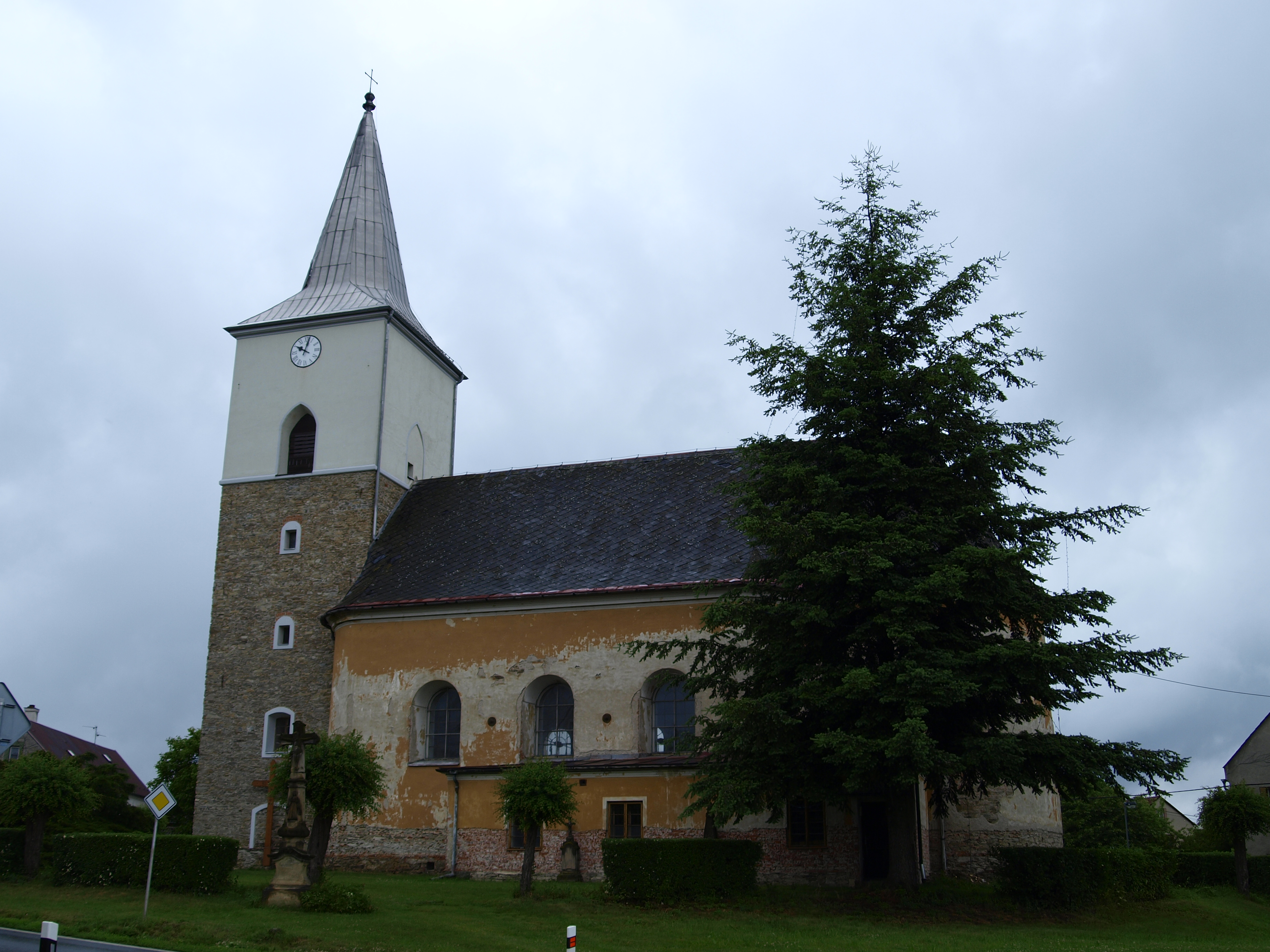
- Church of Saint Mary Magdalene

- Flag Coat of arms

- Location in the Czech Republic
- Coordinates: 49°45′9″N 17°13′53″E
- Country: Czech Republic
- Region: Olomouc
- District: Olomouc
- First mentioned: 1141

Area
  - Total: 10.44 km^{2} (4.03 sq mi)
- Elevation: 243 m (797 ft)

Population (2026-01-01)
  - Total: 732
  - Density: 70.1/km^{2} (182/sq mi)
- Time zone: UTC+1 (CET)
  - Summer (DST): UTC+2 (CEST)
- Postal code: 783 95
- Website: www.mladejovice.cz

Mladějovice is a municipality and village in Olomouc District in the Olomouc Region of the Czech Republic. It has about 700 inhabitants.

Mladějovice lies approximately 18 kilometres (11 mi) north of Olomouc and 205 km (127 mi) east of Prague.

== Demographics ==
Historical population
Year	Pop.	±%
1869	518	—
1880	551	+6.4%
1890	534	−3.1%
1900	529	−0.9%
1910	560	+5.9%
1921	583	+4.1%
1930	748	+28.3%
1950	550	−26.5%
1961	612	+11.3%
1970	588	−3.9%
1980	622	+5.8%
1991	620	−0.3%
2001	631	+1.8%
2011	681	+7.9%
2021	674	−1.0%
Source: Censuses
