= Horní Loděnice =

- Municipality
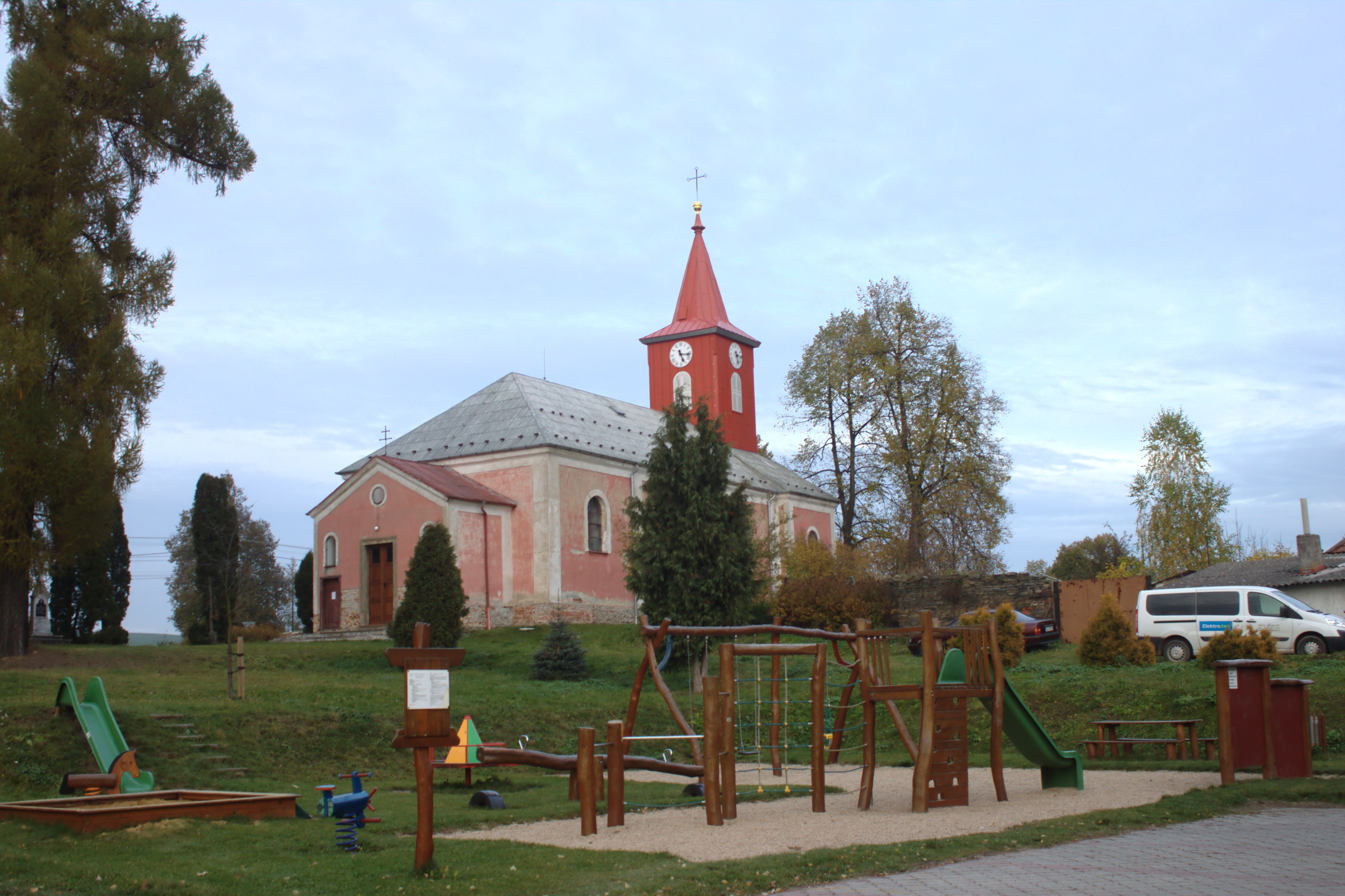
- Church of Saint Isidore

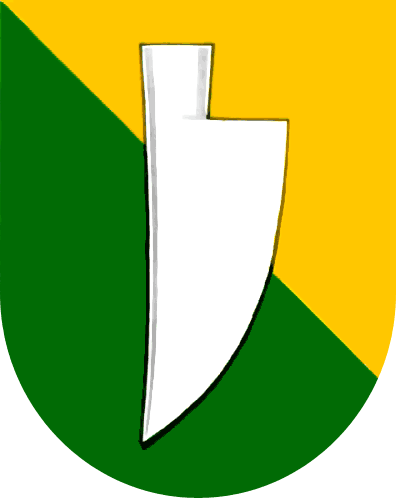
- Flag Coat of arms

- Location in the Czech Republic
- Coordinates: 49°46′16″N 17°22′38″E
- Country: Czech Republic
- Region: Olomouc
- District: Olomouc
- First mentioned: 1296

Area
  - Total: 18.19 km^{2} (7.02 sq mi)
- Elevation: 543 m (1,781 ft)

Population (2026-01-01)
  - Total: 337
  - Density: 18.5/km^{2} (48.0/sq mi)
- Time zone: UTC+1 (CET)
  - Summer (DST): UTC+2 (CEST)
- Postal code: 783 05
- Website: www.hornilodenice.cz

Horní Loděnice (until 1950 Německá Loděnice; German: Deutsch Lodenitz) is a municipality and village in Olomouc District in the Olomouc Region of the Czech Republic. It has about 300 inhabitants.

Horní Loděnice lies approximately 22 kilometres (14 mi) north-east of Olomouc and 214 km (133 mi) east of Prague.

== Demographics ==
Historical population
Year	Pop.	±%
1869	984	—
1880	975	−0.9%
1890	922	−5.4%
1900	830	−10.0%
1910	798	−3.9%
1921	781	−2.1%
1930	778	−0.4%
1950	305	−60.8%
1961	376	+23.3%
1970	386	+2.7%
1980	309	−19.9%
1991	302	−2.3%
2001	336	+11.3%
2011	323	−3.9%
2021	300	−7.1%
Source: Censuses
