= Slavětín (Olomouc District) =

- Municipality
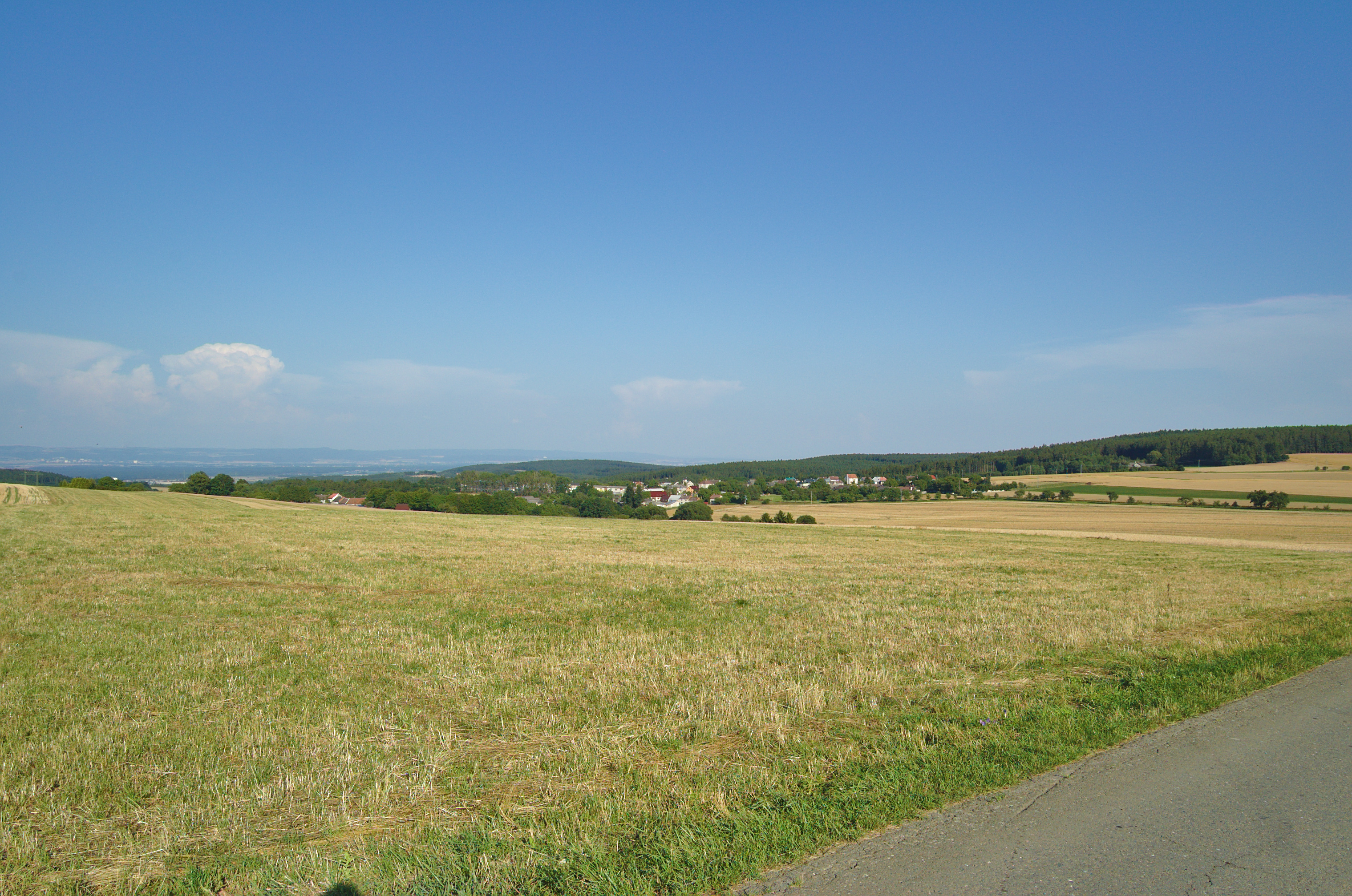
- View from the west

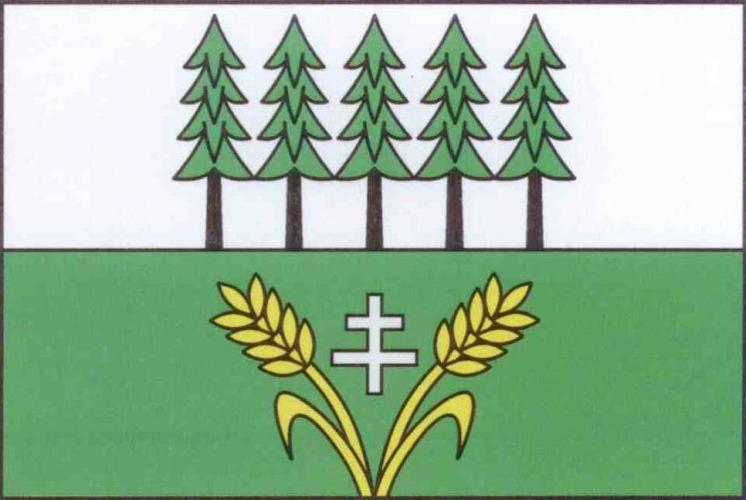
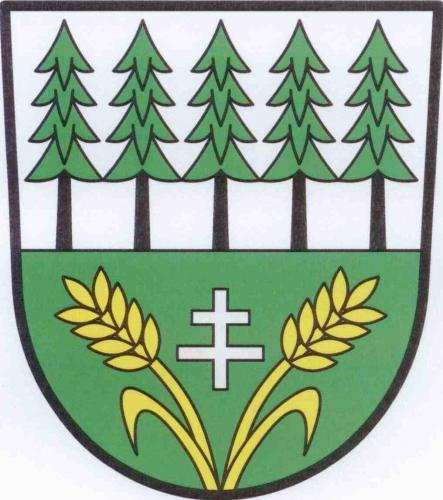
- Flag Coat of arms

- Location in the Czech Republic
- Coordinates: 49°40′28″N 16°57′49″E
- Country: Czech Republic
- Region: Olomouc
- District: Olomouc
- First mentioned: 1260

Area
  - Total: 4.90 km^{2} (1.89 sq mi)
- Elevation: 435 m (1,427 ft)

Population (2026-01-01)
  - Total: 212
  - Density: 43.3/km^{2} (112/sq mi)
- Time zone: UTC+1 (CET)
  - Summer (DST): UTC+2 (CEST)
- Postal code: 783 24
- Website: www.obecslavetin.cz

Slavětín is a municipality and village in Olomouc District in the Olomouc Region of the Czech Republic. It has about 200 inhabitants.

Slavětín lies approximately 23 kilometres (14 mi) north-west of Olomouc and 188 km (117 mi) east of Prague.

== History ==
The first written mention of Slavětín is from 1260.

== Demographics ==
Historical population
| Year | Pop. | ±% |
|---|---|---|
| 1869 | 327 | — |
| 1880 | 328 | +0.3% |
| 1890 | 352 | +7.3% |
| 1900 | 368 | +4.5% |
| 1910 | 387 | +5.2% |
| 1921 | 358 | −7.5% |
| 1930 | 344 | −3.9% |
| 1950 | 276 | −19.8% |
| 1961 | 263 | −4.7% |
| 1970 | 255 | −3.0% |
| 1980 | 236 | −7.5% |
| 1991 | 196 | −16.9% |
| 2001 | 194 | −1.0% |
| 2011 | 204 | +5.2% |
| 2021 | 188 | −7.8% |
Source: Censuses
