= Dubčany =

- Municipality
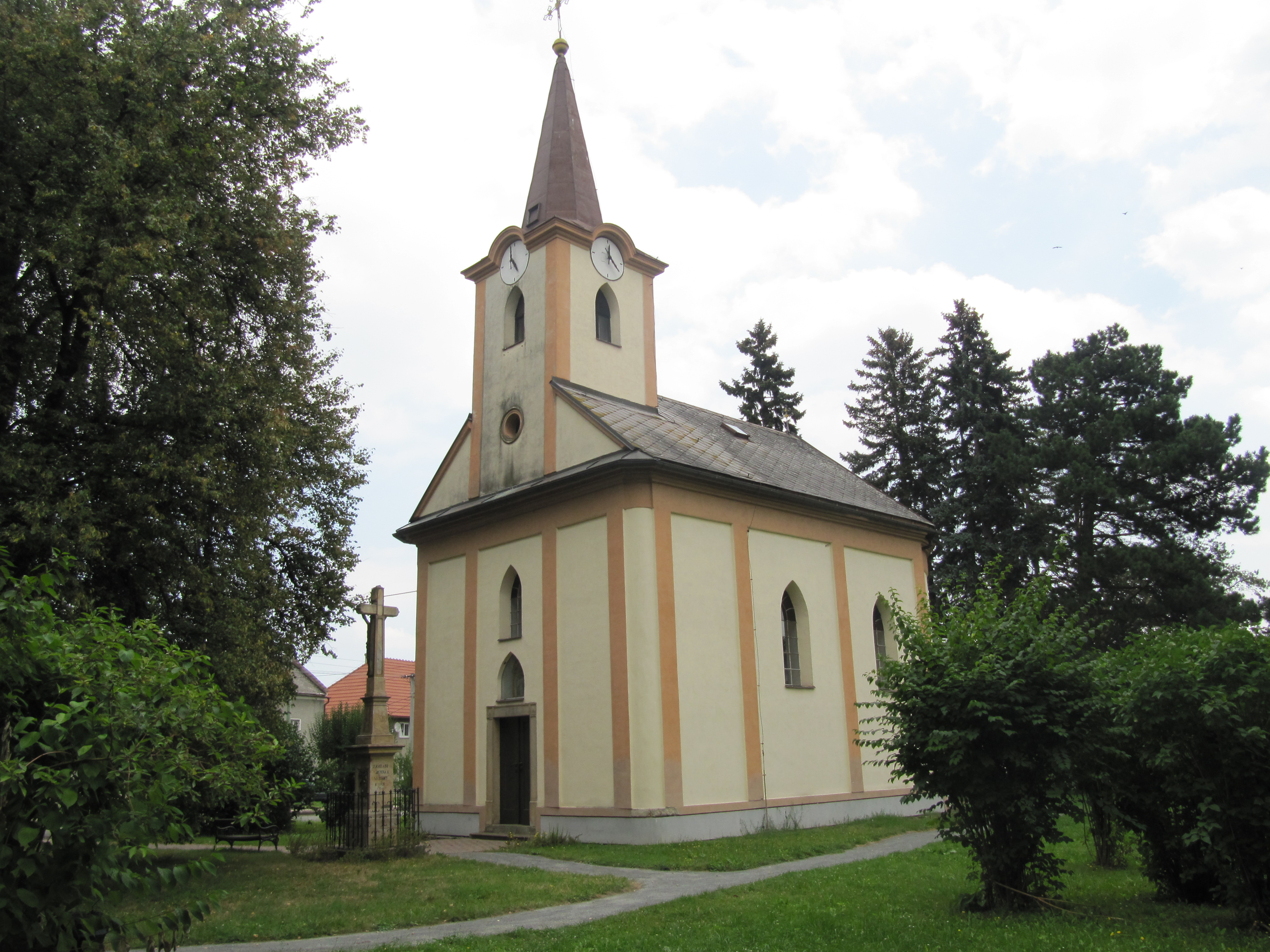
- Chapel of Saint Isidore the Laborer

- Flag Coat of arms

- Location in the Czech Republic
- Coordinates: 49°38′57″N 17°4′44″E
- Country: Czech Republic
- Region: Olomouc
- District: Olomouc
- First mentioned: 1342

Area
  - Total: 3.44 km^{2} (1.33 sq mi)
- Elevation: 240 m (790 ft)

Population (2026-01-01)
  - Total: 275
  - Density: 79.9/km^{2} (207/sq mi)
- Time zone: UTC+1 (CET)
  - Summer (DST): UTC+2 (CEST)
- Postal code: 783 22
- Website: www.dubcany.cz

Dubčany is a municipality and village in Olomouc District in the Olomouc Region of the Czech Republic. It has about 300 inhabitants.

Dubčany lies approximately 13 kilometres (8 mi) north-west of Olomouc and 198 km (123 mi) east of Prague.

== Demographics ==
Historical population
Year	Pop.	±%
1869	291	—
1880	313	+7.6%
1890	332	+6.1%
1900	322	−3.0%
1910	331	+2.8%
1921	351	+6.0%
1930	352	+0.3%
1950	272	−22.7%
1961	262	−3.7%
1970	217	−17.2%
1980	236	+8.8%
1991	233	−1.3%
2001	207	−11.2%
2011	215	+3.9%
2021	268	+24.7%
Source: Censuses
