= Řídeč =

- Municipality
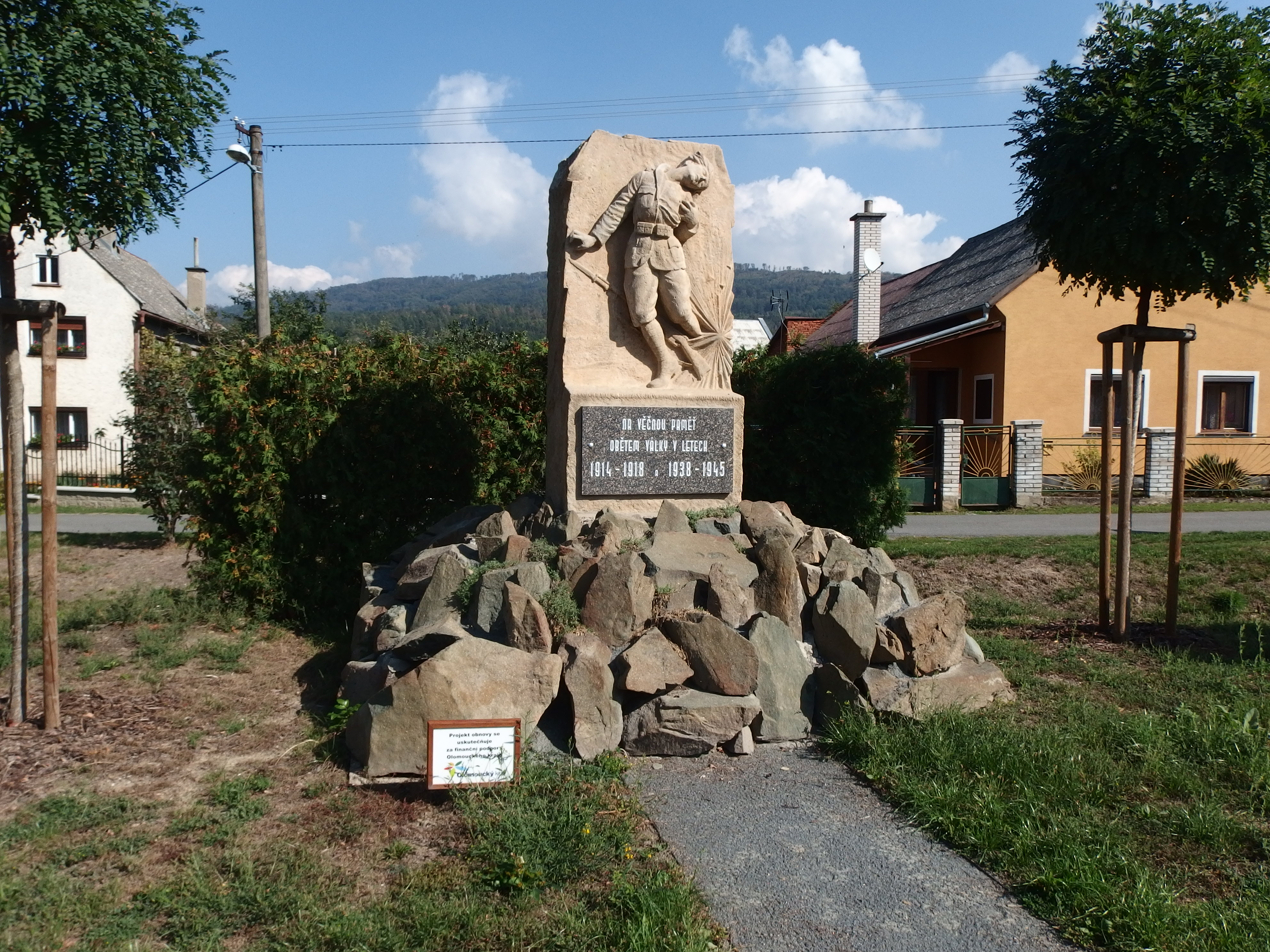
- Monument to the victims of World Wars

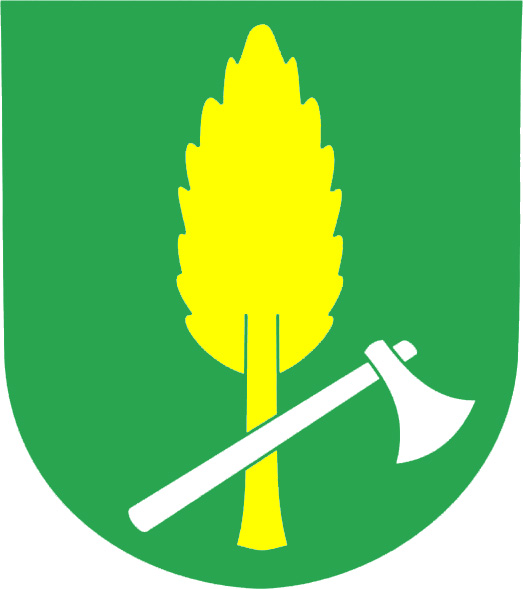
- Flag Coat of arms

- Location in the Czech Republic
- Coordinates: 49°45′57″N 17°15′25″E
- Country: Czech Republic
- Region: Olomouc
- District: Olomouc
- First mentioned: 1295

Area
  - Total: 7.27 km^{2} (2.81 sq mi)
- Elevation: 284 m (932 ft)

Population (2026-01-01)
  - Total: 188
  - Density: 25.9/km^{2} (67.0/sq mi)
- Time zone: UTC+1 (CET)
  - Summer (DST): UTC+2 (CEST)
- Postal code: 785 01
- Website: www.ridec.cz

Řídeč is a municipality and village in Olomouc District in the Olomouc Region of the Czech Republic. It has about 200 inhabitants.

Řídeč lies approximately 20 kilometres (12 mi) north of Olomouc and 207 km (129 mi) east of Prague.

== Demographics ==
Historical population
Year	Pop.	±%
1869	320	—
1880	262	−18.1%
1890	269	+2.7%
1900	256	−4.8%
1910	244	−4.7%
1921	255	+4.5%
1930	263	+3.1%
1950	192	−27.0%
1961	208	+8.3%
1970	224	+7.7%
1980	179	−20.1%
1991	141	−21.2%
2001	161	+14.2%
2011	177	+9.9%
2021	184	+4.0%
Source: Censuses
