= Komárov (Olomouc District) =

- Municipality
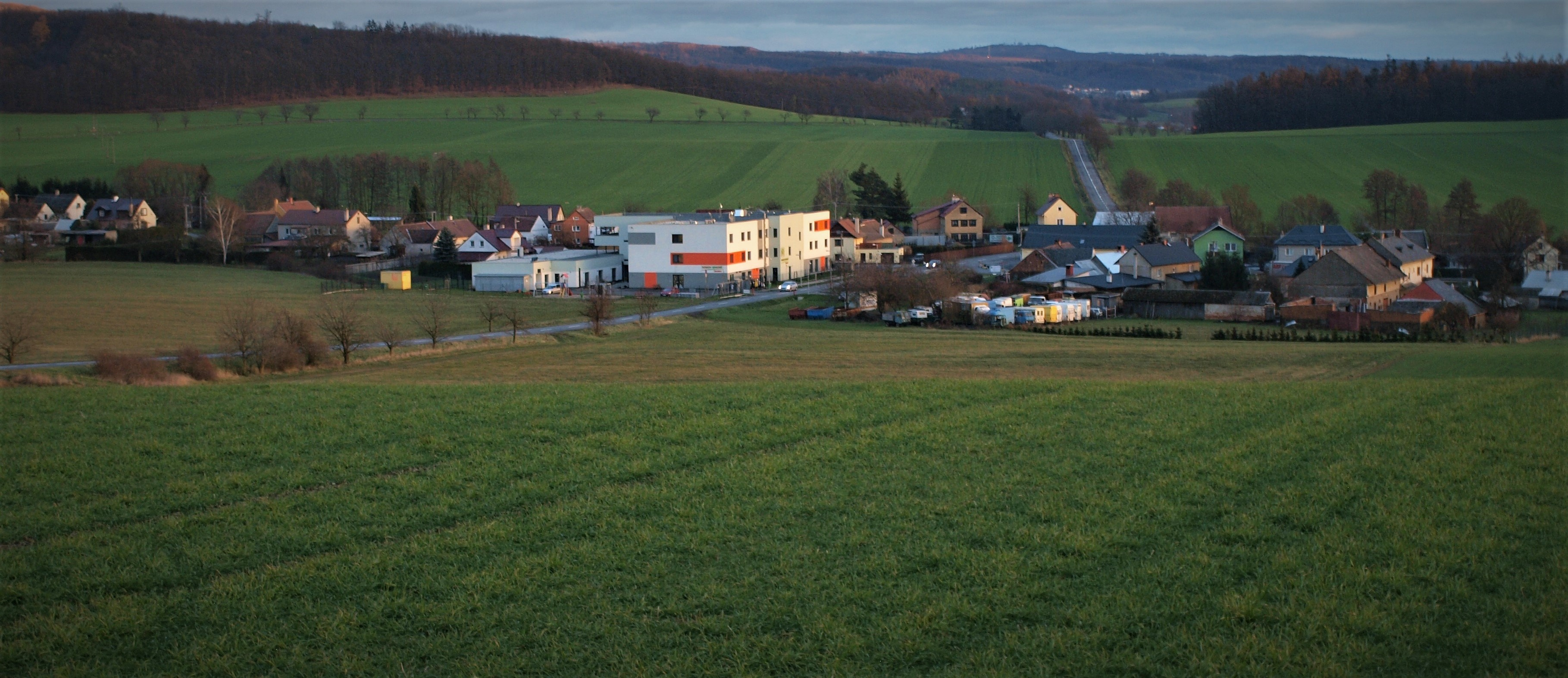
- View from the north

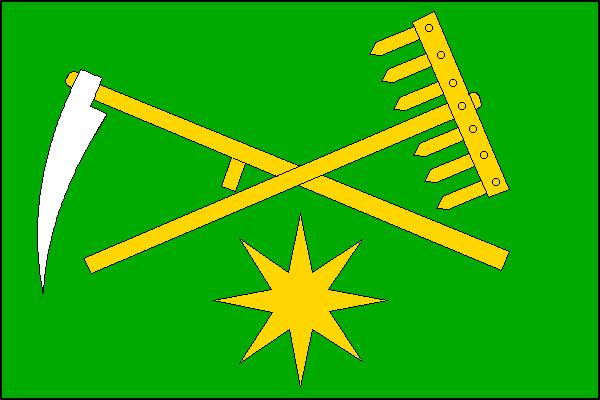
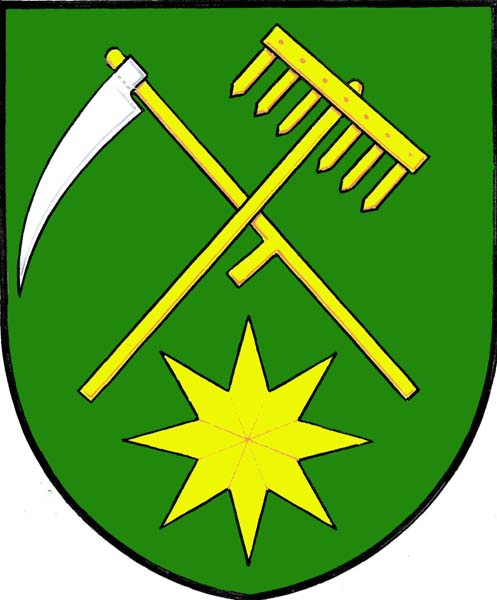
- Flag Coat of arms

- Location in the Czech Republic
- Coordinates: 49°45′51″N 17°14′28″E
- Country: Czech Republic
- Region: Olomouc
- District: Olomouc
- First mentioned: 1480

Area
  - Total: 1.49 km^{2} (0.58 sq mi)
- Elevation: 261 m (856 ft)

Population (2026-01-01)
  - Total: 224
  - Density: 150/km^{2} (389/sq mi)
- Time zone: UTC+1 (CET)
  - Summer (DST): UTC+2 (CEST)
- Postal code: 785 01
- Website: www.obec-komarov.cz

Komárov is a municipality and village in Olomouc District in the Olomouc Region of the Czech Republic. It has about 200 inhabitants.

Komárov lies approximately 20 kilometres (12 mi) north of Olomouc and 206 km (128 mi) east of Prague.

== Demographics ==
Historical population
| Year | Pop. | ±% |
|---|---|---|
| 1869 | 182 | — |
| 1880 | 191 | +4.9% |
| 1890 | 166 | −13.1% |
| 1900 | 165 | −0.6% |
| 1910 | 180 | +9.1% |
| 1921 | 169 | −6.1% |
| 1930 | 187 | +10.7% |
| 1950 | 138 | −26.2% |
| 1961 | 143 | +3.6% |
| 1970 | 158 | +10.5% |
| 1980 | 160 | +1.3% |
| 1991 | 164 | +2.5% |
| 2001 | 170 | +3.7% |
| 2011 | 175 | +2.9% |
| 2021 | 257 | +46.9% |
Source: Censuses
