= Huzová =

- Municipality
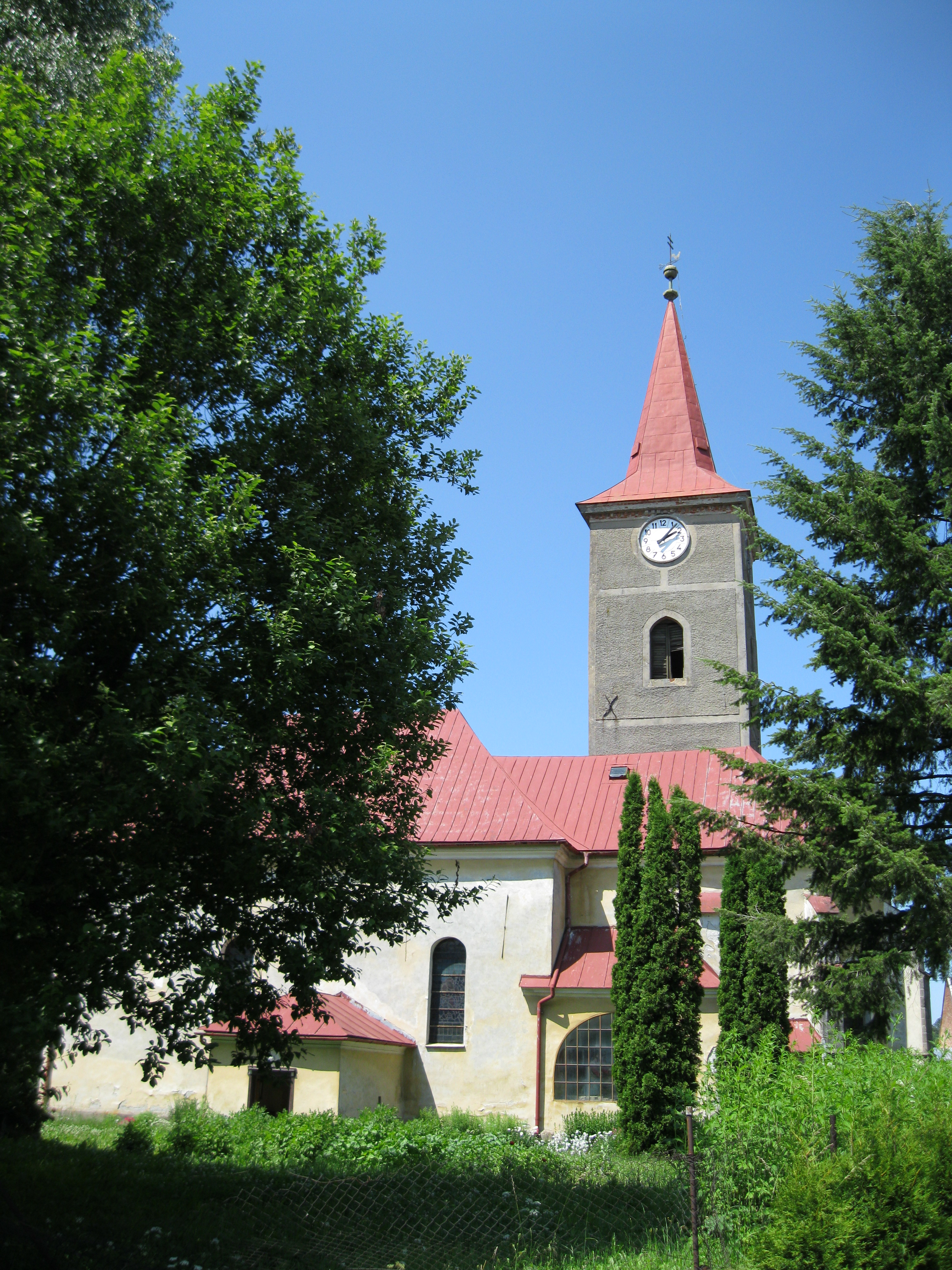
- Church of Saint Giles

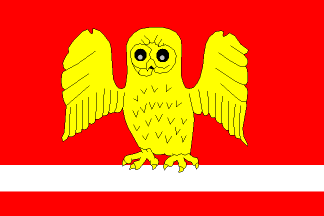
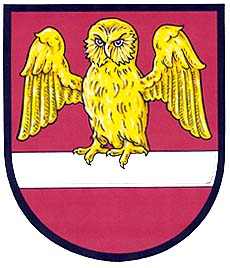
- Flag Coat of arms

- Location in the Czech Republic
- Coordinates: 49°49′12″N 17°17′53″E
- Country: Czech Republic
- Region: Olomouc
- District: Olomouc
- First mentioned: 1141

Area
  - Total: 34.39 km^{2} (13.28 sq mi)
- Elevation: 534 m (1,752 ft)

Population (2026-01-01)
  - Total: 591
  - Density: 17.2/km^{2} (44.5/sq mi)
- Time zone: UTC+1 (CET)
  - Summer (DST): UTC+2 (CEST)
- Postal code: 783 57
- Website: www.huzova.cz

Huzová (until 1951 Německá Húzová; German: Deutsch Hause) is a municipality and village in Olomouc District in the Olomouc Region of the Czech Republic. It has about 600 inhabitants.

Huzová lies approximately 26 kilometres (16 mi) north of Olomouc and 210 km (130 mi) east of Prague.

== Administrative division ==
Huzová consists of three municipal parts (in brackets population according to the 2021 census):

- Huzová (415)
- Arnoltice (107)
- Veveří (15)

== Demographics ==
Historical population
| Year | Pop. | ±% |
|---|---|---|
| 1869 | 2,533 | — |
| 1880 | 2,563 | +1.2% |
| 1890 | 2,468 | −3.7% |
| 1900 | 2,278 | −7.7% |
| 1910 | 2,146 | −5.8% |
| 1921 | 1,992 | −7.2% |
| 1930 | 1,830 | −8.1% |
| 1950 | 634 | −65.4% |
| 1961 | 615 | −3.0% |
| 1970 | 748 | +21.6% |
| 1980 | 639 | −14.6% |
| 1991 | 637 | −0.3% |
| 2001 | 654 | +2.7% |
| 2011 | 580 | −11.3% |
| 2021 | 537 | −7.4% |
Source: Censuses
