= Střeň =

- Municipality
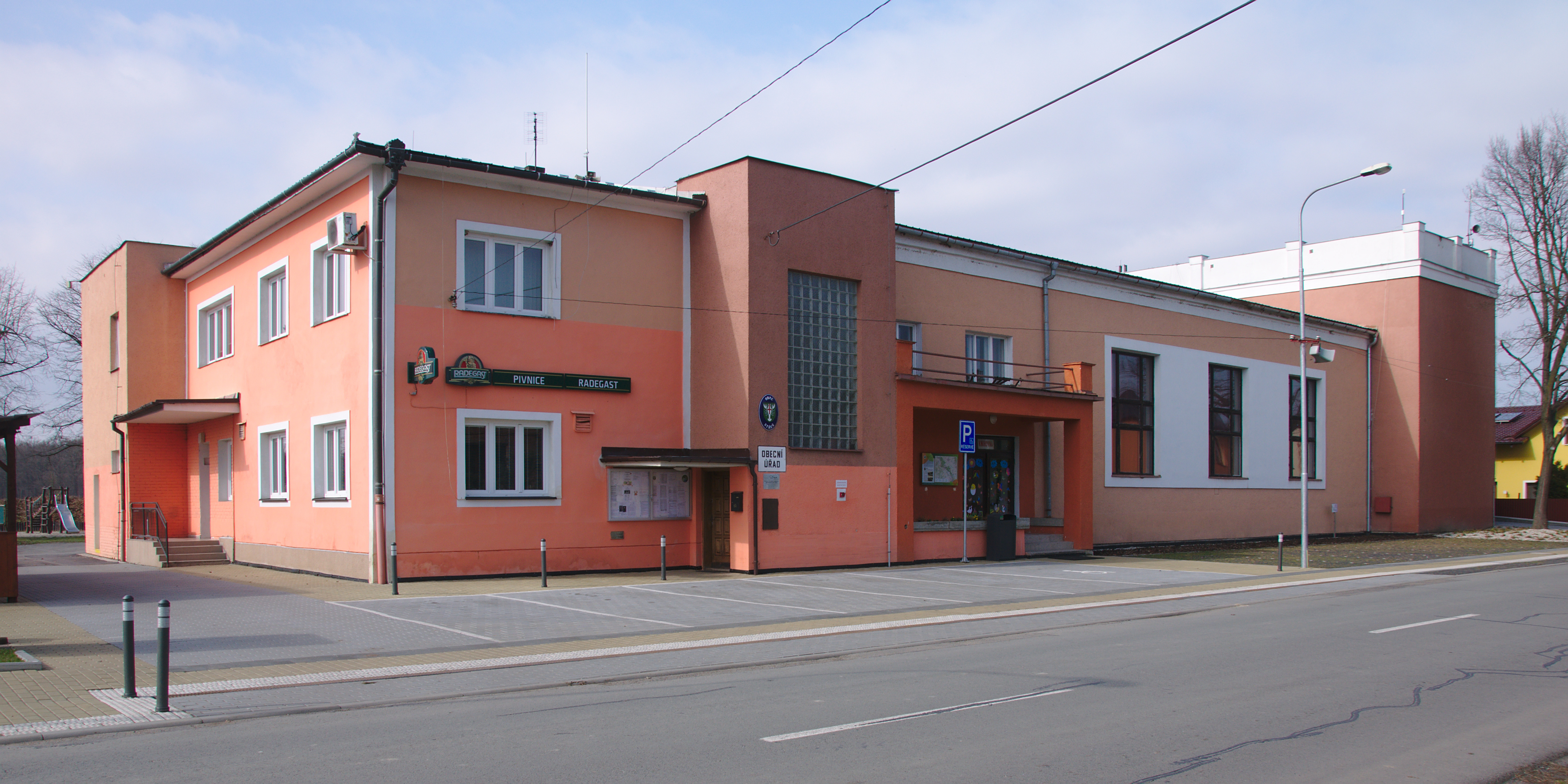
- Municipal office

- Flag Coat of arms

- Location in the Czech Republic
- Coordinates: 49°41′30″N 17°9′14″E
- Country: Czech Republic
- Region: Olomouc
- District: Olomouc
- First mentioned: 1390

Area
  - Total: 5.81 km^{2} (2.24 sq mi)
- Elevation: 225 m (738 ft)

Population (2026-01-01)
  - Total: 604
  - Density: 104/km^{2} (269/sq mi)
- Time zone: UTC+1 (CET)
  - Summer (DST): UTC+2 (CEST)
- Postal code: 783 32
- Website: www.stren.cz

Střeň is a municipality and village in Olomouc District in the Olomouc Region of the Czech Republic. It has about 600 inhabitants.

Střeň lies approximately 13 kilometres (8 mi) north-west of Olomouc and 202 km (126 mi) east of Prague.

== Demographics ==
Historical population
Year	Pop.	±%
1869	337	—
1880	354	+5.0%
1890	359	+1.4%
1900	416	+15.9%
1910	422	+1.4%
1921	466	+10.4%
1930	478	+2.6%
1950	506	+5.9%
1961	592	+17.0%
1970	598	+1.0%
1980	579	−3.2%
1991	543	−6.2%
2001	543	+0.0%
2011	573	+5.5%
2021	582	+1.6%
Source: Censuses
