= Hlásnice =

- Municipality
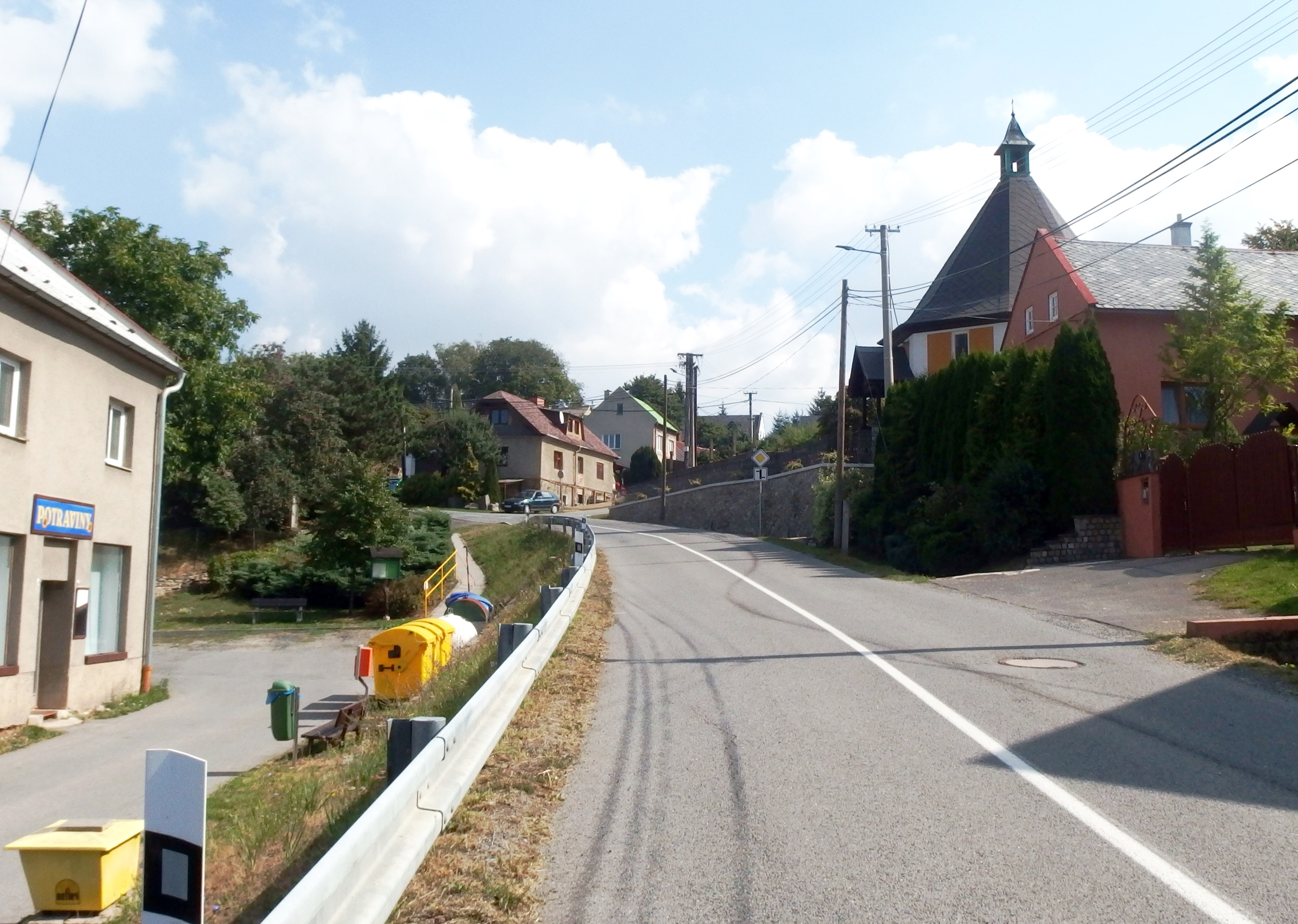
- Main street

- Flag Coat of arms

- Location in the Czech Republic
- Coordinates: 49°45′12″N 17°17′41″E
- Country: Czech Republic
- Region: Olomouc
- District: Olomouc
- First mentioned: 1397

Area
  - Total: 2.76 km^{2} (1.07 sq mi)
- Elevation: 380 m (1,250 ft)

Population (2026-01-01)
  - Total: 259
  - Density: 93.8/km^{2} (243/sq mi)
- Time zone: UTC+1 (CET)
  - Summer (DST): UTC+2 (CEST)
- Postal code: 785 01
- Website: www.obechlasnice.cz

Hlásnice (German: Wächtersdorf) is a municipality and village in Olomouc District in the Olomouc Region of the Czech Republic. It has about 300 inhabitants.

Hlásnice lies approximately 19 kilometres (12 mi) north of Olomouc and 210 km (130 mi) east of Prague.

== Demographics ==
Historical population
Year	Pop.	±%
1869	297	—
1880	300	+1.0%
1890	344	+14.7%
1900	327	−4.9%
1910	303	−7.3%
1921	312	+3.0%
1930	301	−3.5%
1950	186	−38.2%
1961	215	+15.6%
1970	144	−33.0%
1980	127	−11.8%
1991	136	+7.1%
2001	145	+6.6%
2011	201	+38.6%
2021	234	+16.4%
Source: Censuses
