= Tovéř =

- Municipality
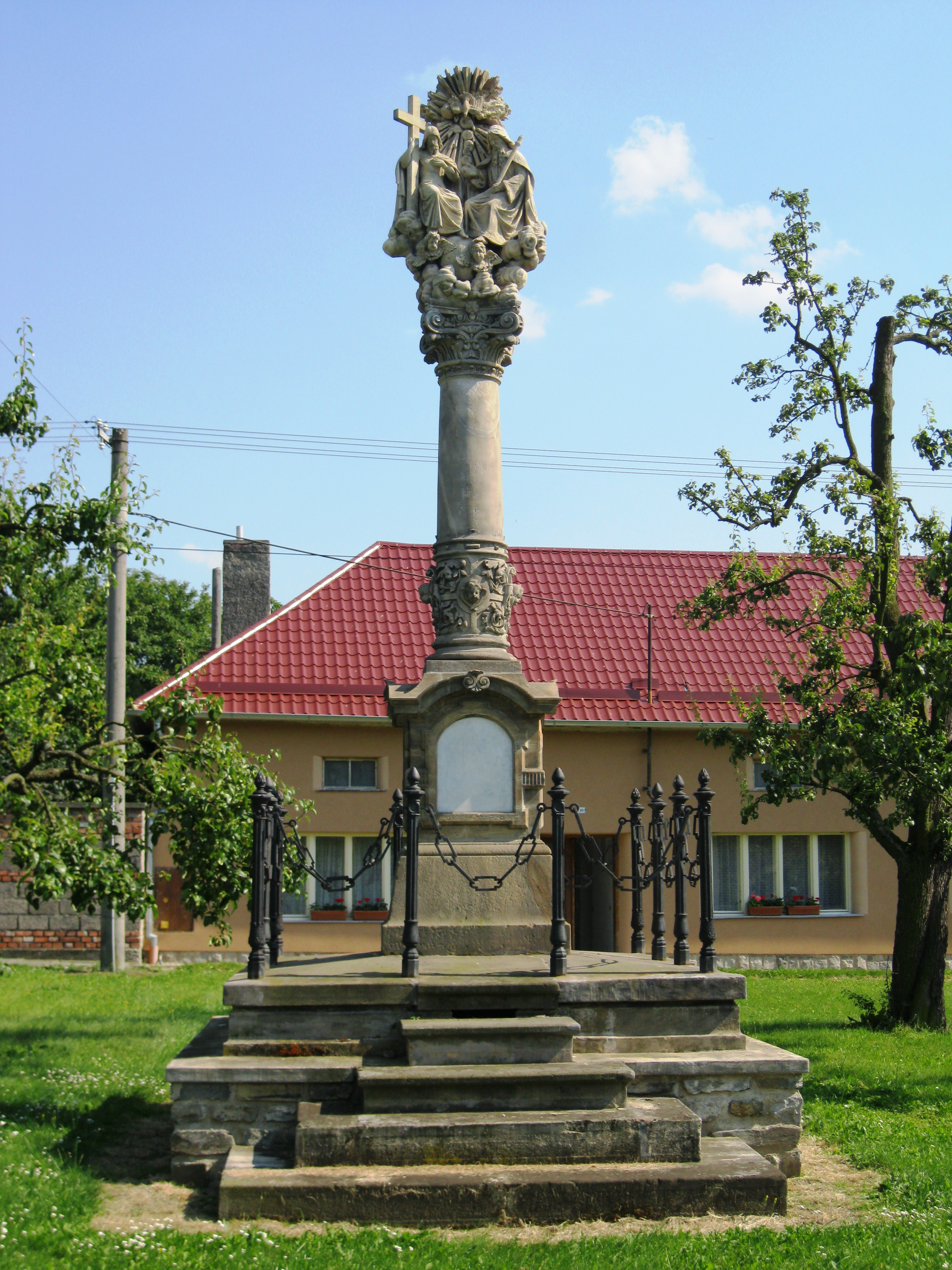
- Holy Trinity column

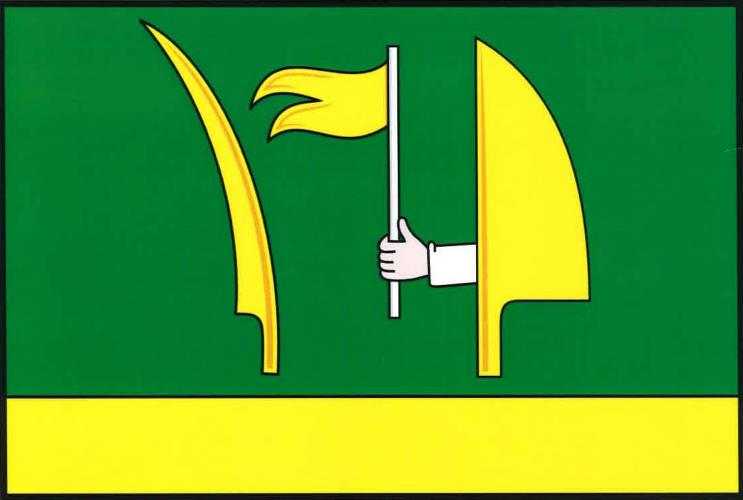
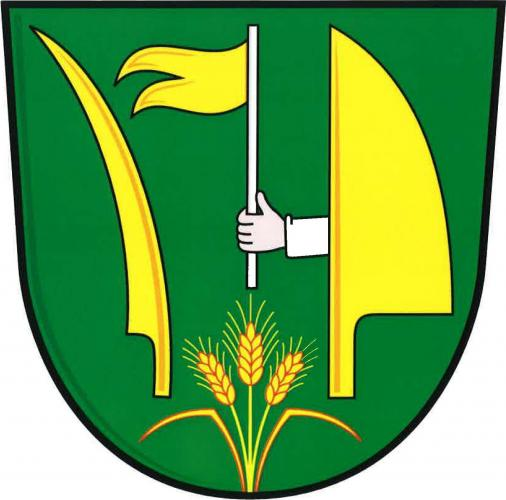
- Flag Coat of arms

- Location in the Czech Republic
- Coordinates: 49°38′24″N 17°19′9″E
- Country: Czech Republic
- Region: Olomouc
- District: Olomouc
- First mentioned: 1203

Area
  - Total: 2.06 km^{2} (0.80 sq mi)
- Elevation: 247 m (810 ft)

Population (2026-01-01)
  - Total: 630
  - Density: 310/km^{2} (790/sq mi)
- Time zone: UTC+1 (CET)
  - Summer (DST): UTC+2 (CEST)
- Postal code: 783 16
- Website: www.tover.cz

Tovéř is a municipality and village in Olomouc District in the Olomouc Region of the Czech Republic. It has about 600 inhabitants.

Tovéř lies approximately 8 kilometres (5 mi) north-east of Olomouc and 215 km (134 mi) east of Prague.

== Demographics ==
Historical population
Year	Pop.	±%
1869	253	—
1880	242	−4.3%
1890	273	+12.8%
1900	274	+0.4%
1910	303	+10.6%
1921	324	+6.9%
1930	421	+29.9%
1950	337	−20.0%
1961	443	+31.5%
1970	400	−9.7%
1980	369	−7.8%
1991	390	+5.7%
2001	464	+19.0%
2011	563	+21.3%
2021	618	+9.8%
Source: Censuses
