= Krčmaň =

- Municipality
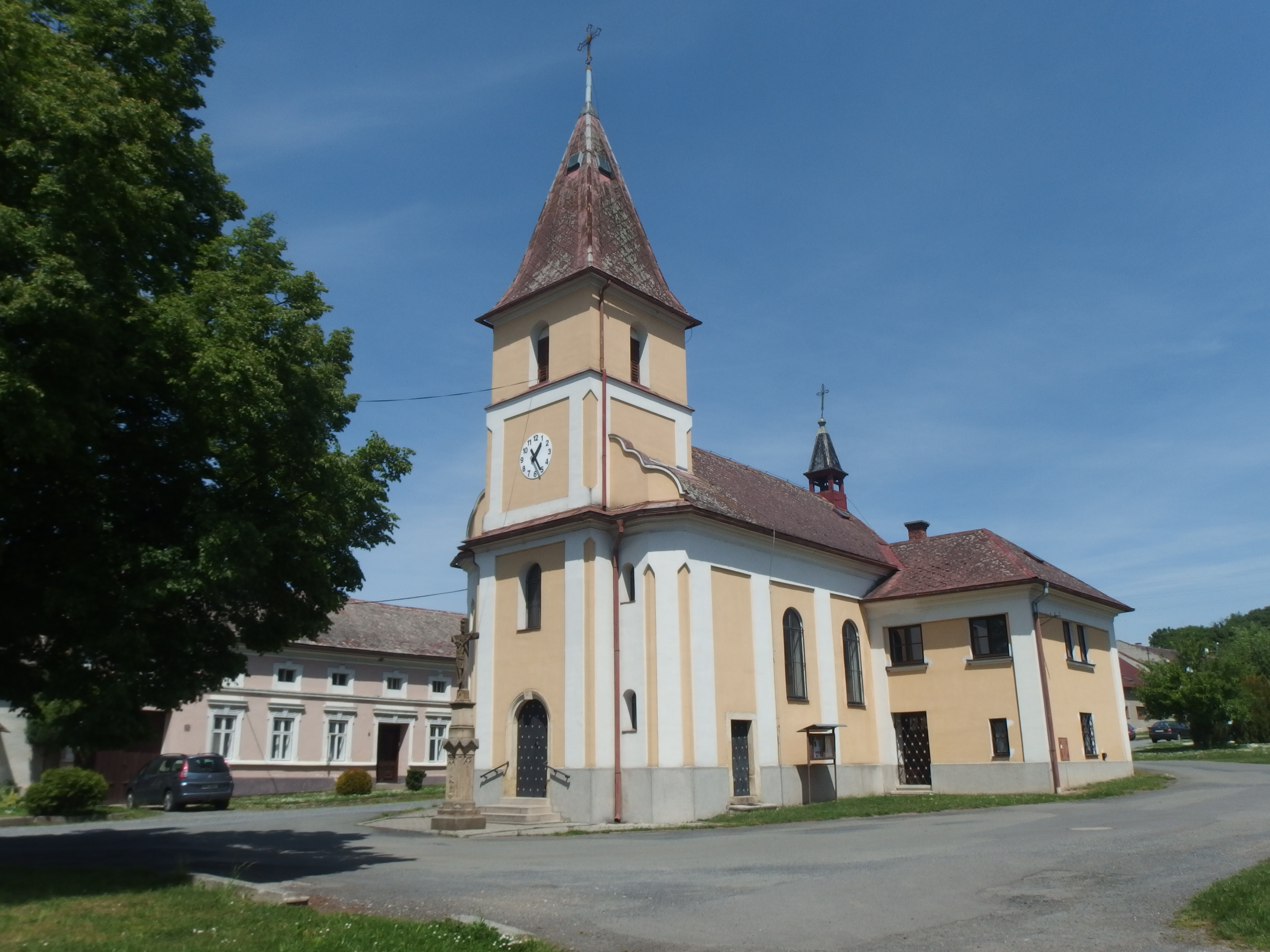
- Church of Saint Florian

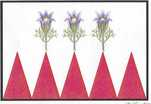
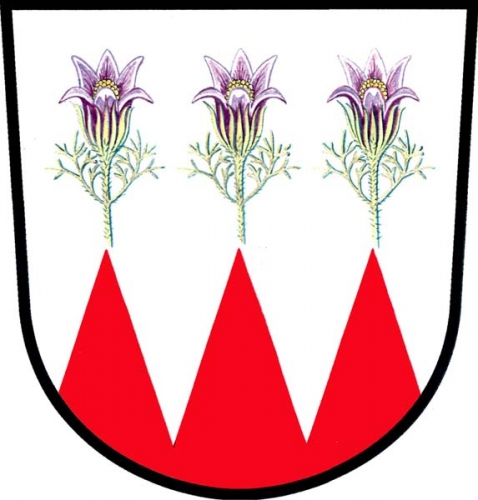
- Flag Coat of arms

- Location in the Czech Republic
- Coordinates: 49°31′15″N 17°20′39″E
- Country: Czech Republic
- Region: Olomouc
- District: Olomouc
- First mentioned: 1259

Area
  - Total: 4.98 km^{2} (1.92 sq mi)
- Elevation: 223 m (732 ft)

Population (2026-01-01)
  - Total: 475
  - Density: 95.4/km^{2} (247/sq mi)
- Time zone: UTC+1 (CET)
  - Summer (DST): UTC+2 (CEST)
- Postal code: 779 00
- Website: www.krcman.cz

Krčmaň is a municipality and village in Olomouc District in the Olomouc Region of the Czech Republic. It has about 500 inhabitants.

Krčmaň lies approximately 11 kilometres (7 mi) south-east of Olomouc and 220 km (140 mi) east of Prague.

== Demographics ==
Historical population
Year	Pop.	±%
1869	410	—
1880	506	+23.4%
1890	548	+8.3%
1900	601	+9.7%
1910	679	+13.0%
1921	700	+3.1%
1930	683	−2.4%
1950	581	−14.9%
1961	609	+4.8%
1970	574	−5.7%
1980	545	−5.1%
1991	488	−10.5%
2001	453	−7.2%
2011	448	−1.1%
2021	488	+8.9%
Source: Censuses
