= Měrotín =

- Municipality
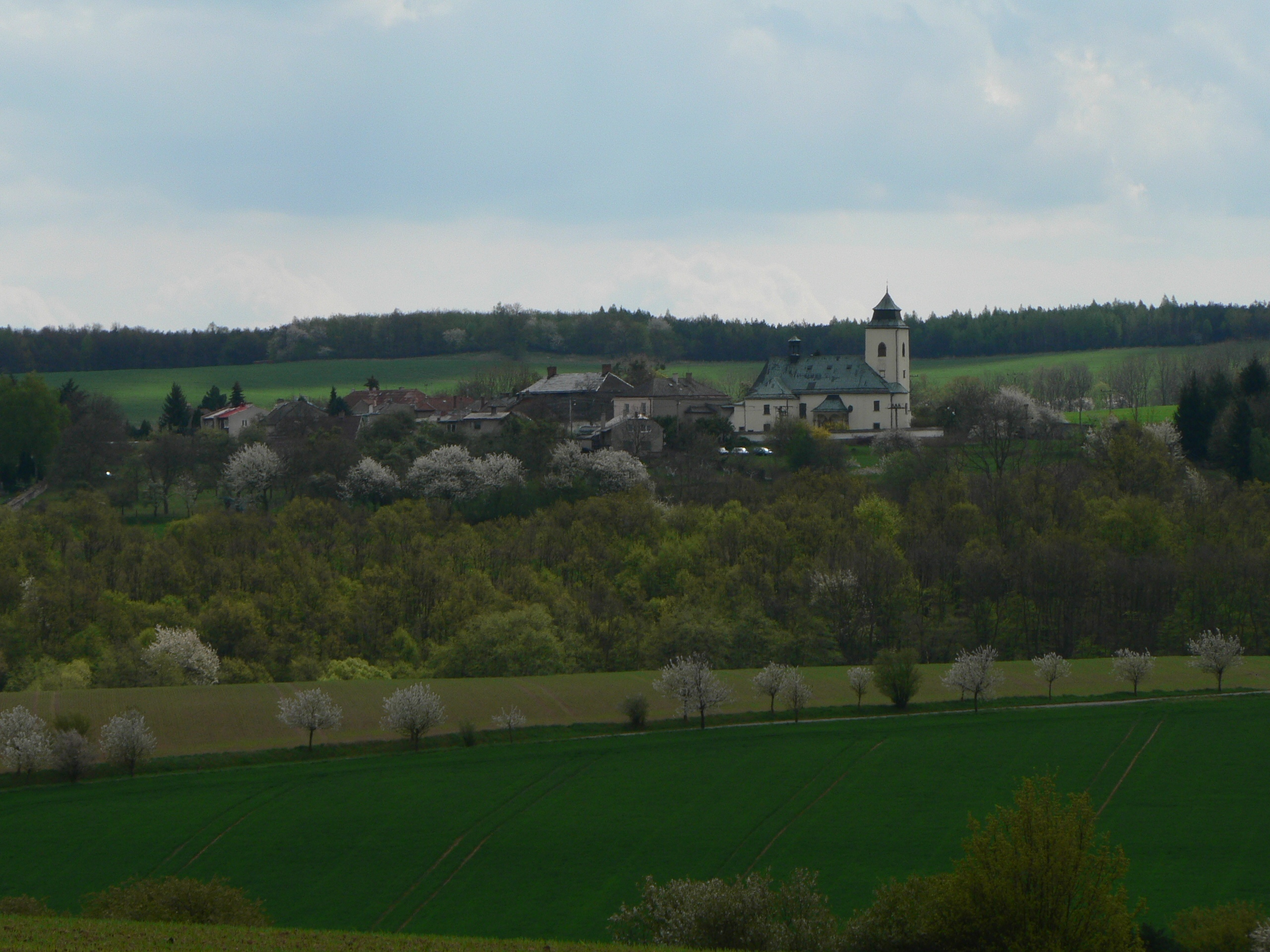
- View from the west

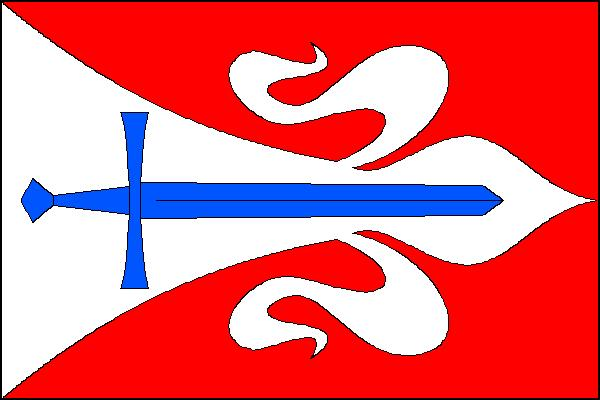
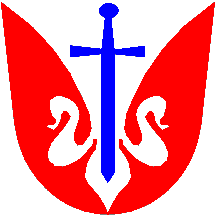
- Flag Coat of arms

- Location in the Czech Republic
- Coordinates: 49°41′33″N 17°0′6″E
- Country: Czech Republic
- Region: Olomouc
- District: Olomouc
- First mentioned: 1365

Area
  - Total: 2.14 km^{2} (0.83 sq mi)
- Elevation: 327 m (1,073 ft)

Population (2026-01-01)
  - Total: 269
  - Density: 126/km^{2} (326/sq mi)
- Time zone: UTC+1 (CET)
  - Summer (DST): UTC+2 (CEST)
- Postal code: 783 24
- Website: www.merotin.cz

Měrotín is a municipality and village in Olomouc District in the Olomouc Region of the Czech Republic. It has about 300 inhabitants.

Měrotín lies approximately 22 kilometres (14 mi) north-west of Olomouc and 190 km (120 mi) east of Prague.

== Demographics ==
Historical population
| Year | Pop. | ±% |
|---|---|---|
| 1869 | 361 | — |
| 1880 | 355 | −1.7% |
| 1890 | 374 | +5.4% |
| 1900 | 397 | +6.1% |
| 1910 | 434 | +9.3% |
| 1921 | 420 | −3.2% |
| 1930 | 397 | −5.5% |
| 1950 | 344 | −13.4% |
| 1961 | 370 | +7.6% |
| 1970 | 374 | +1.1% |
| 1980 | 322 | −13.9% |
| 1991 | 293 | −9.0% |
| 2001 | 291 | −0.7% |
| 2011 | 264 | −9.3% |
| 2021 | 252 | −4.5% |
Source: Censuses
