= Svésedlice =

- Municipality
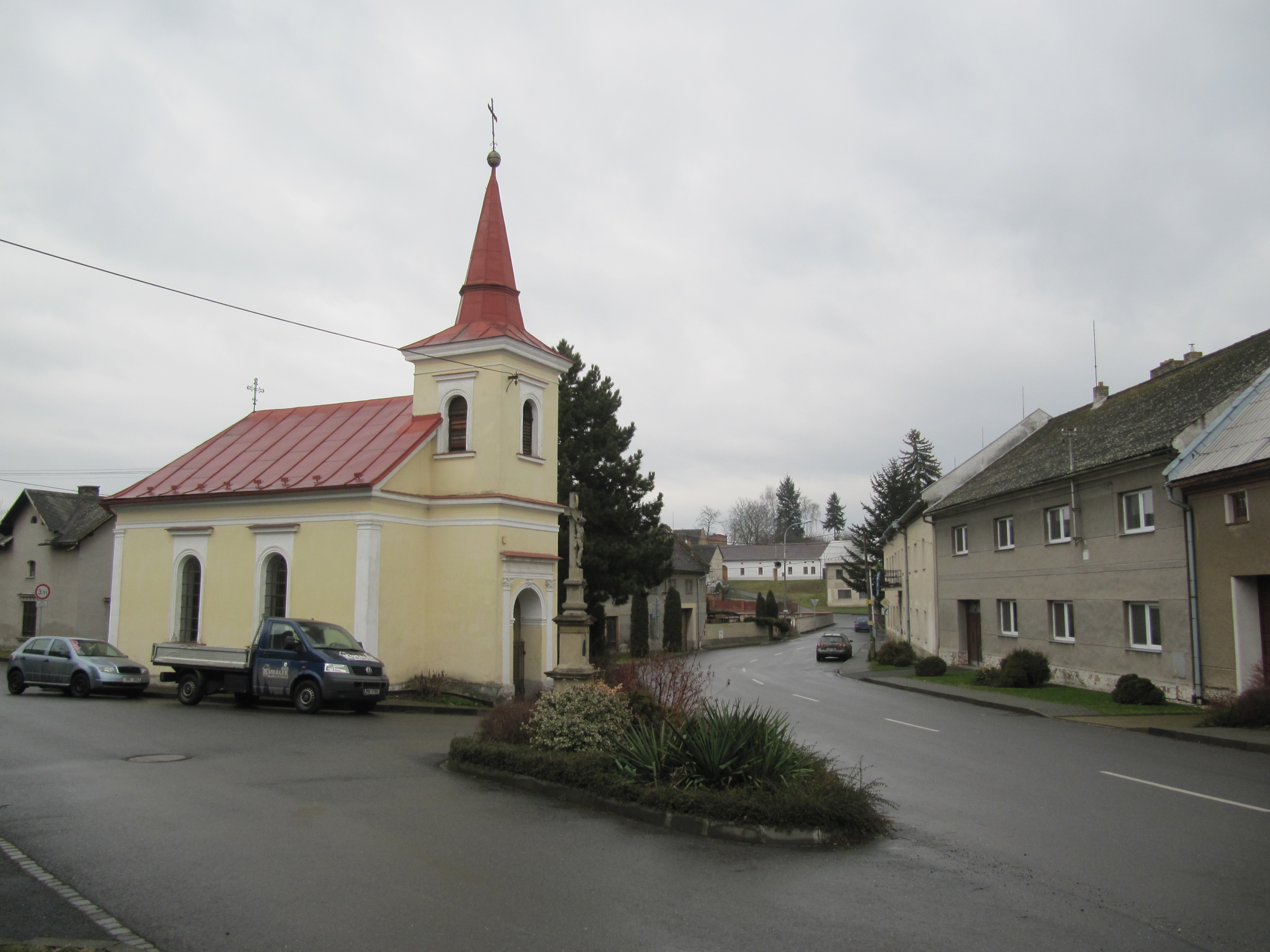
- Centre of Svésedlice with the Chapel of Saints Francis of Assisi and Thomas

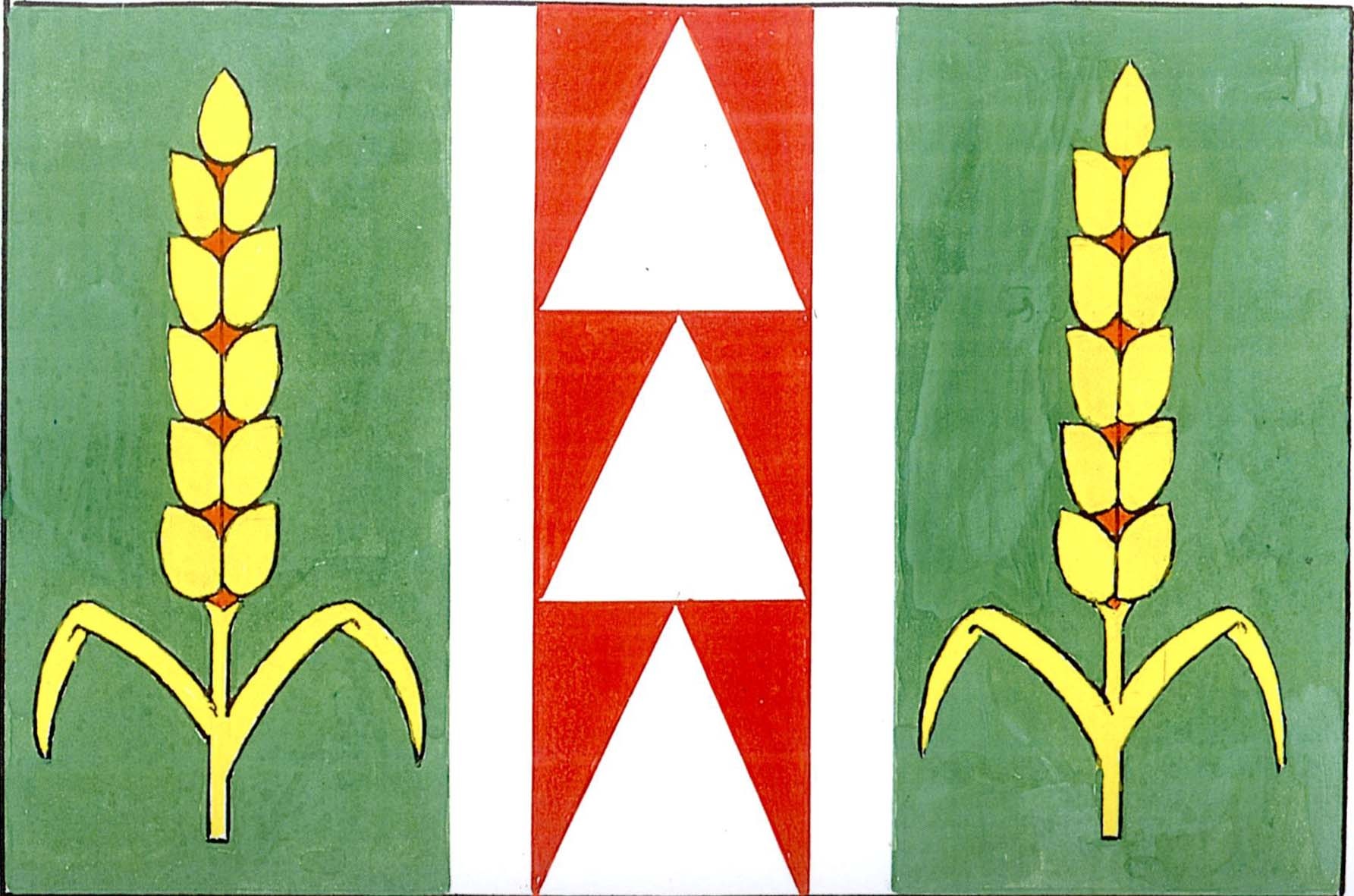
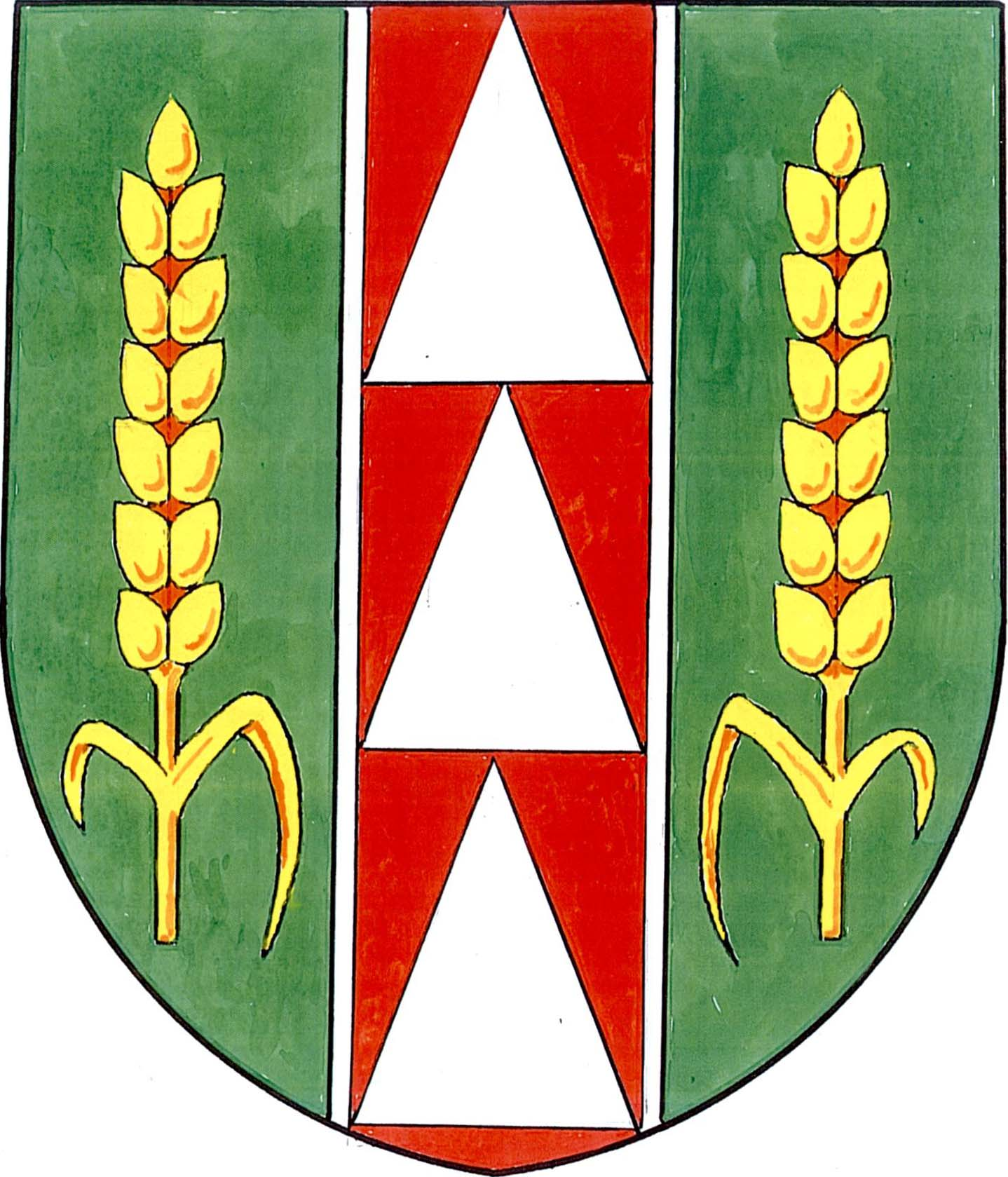
- Flag Coat of arms

- Location in the Czech Republic
- Coordinates: 49°34′21″N 17°22′52″E
- Country: Czech Republic
- Region: Olomouc
- District: Olomouc
- First mentioned: 1370

Area
  - Total: 3.03 km^{2} (1.17 sq mi)
- Elevation: 277 m (909 ft)

Population (2026-01-01)
  - Total: 306
  - Density: 101/km^{2} (262/sq mi)
- Time zone: UTC+1 (CET)
  - Summer (DST): UTC+2 (CEST)
- Postal code: 783 54
- Website: www.svesedlice.cz

Svésedlice is a municipality and village in Olomouc District in the Olomouc Region of the Czech Republic. It has about 300 inhabitants.

Svésedlice lies approximately 10 kilometres (6 mi) east of Olomouc and 221 km (137 mi) east of Prague.

== Demographics ==
Historical population
Year	Pop.	±%
1869	255	—
1880	208	−18.4%
1890	268	+28.8%
1900	297	+10.8%
1910	283	−4.7%
1921	314	+11.0%
1930	315	+0.3%
1950	206	−34.6%
1961	207	+0.5%
1970	202	−2.4%
1980	198	−2.0%
1991	172	−13.1%
2001	181	+5.2%
2011	187	+3.3%
2021	225	+20.3%
Source: Censuses
