= Mutkov =

- Municipality
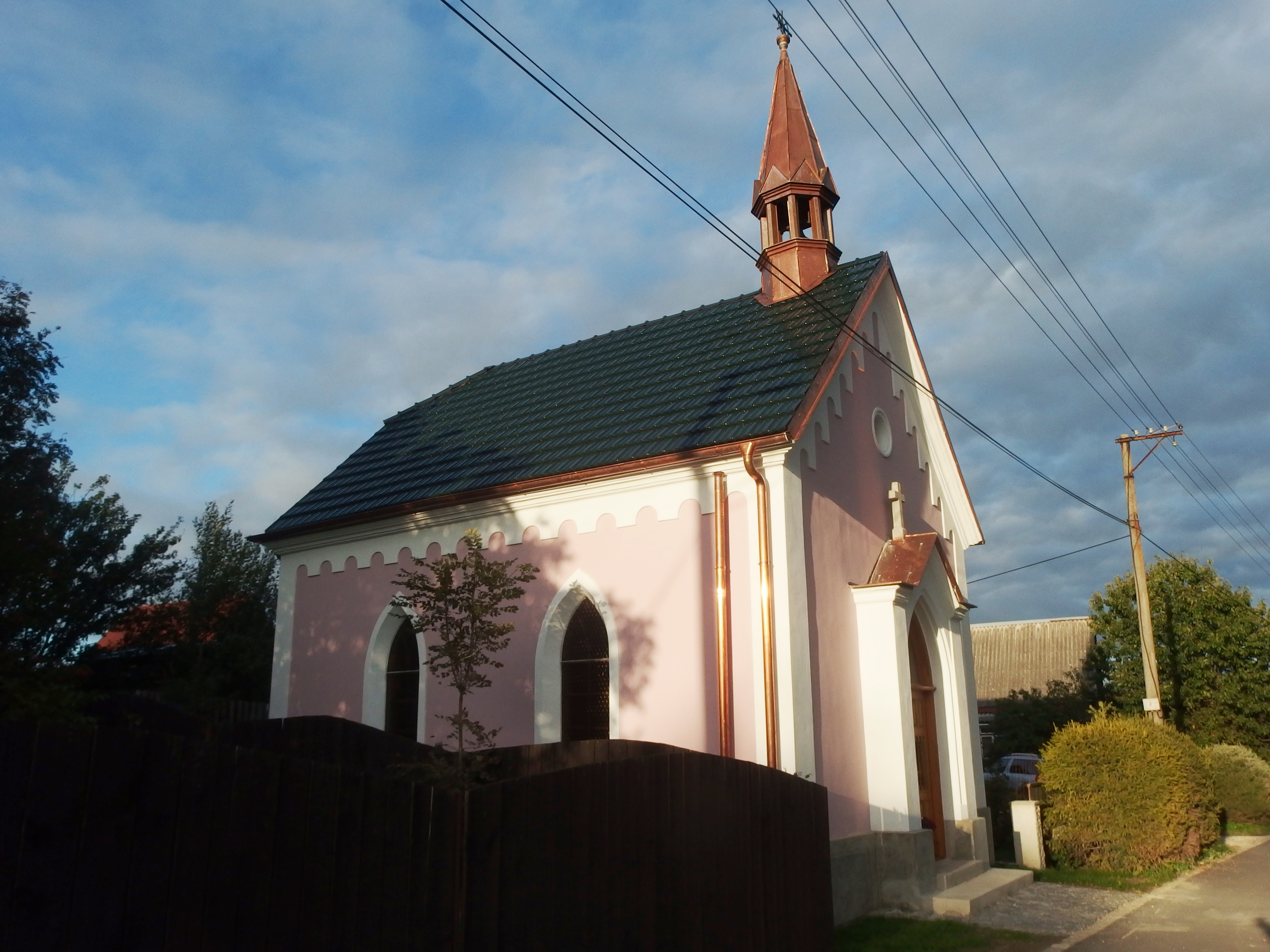
- Chapel of the Virgin Mary

- Flag Coat of arms

- Location in the Czech Republic
- Coordinates: 49°48′7″N 17°17′5″E
- Country: Czech Republic
- Region: Olomouc
- District: Olomouc
- First mentioned: 1320

Area
  - Total: 5.64 km^{2} (2.18 sq mi)
- Elevation: 593 m (1,946 ft)

Population (2026-01-01)
  - Total: 45
  - Density: 8.0/km^{2} (21/sq mi)
- Time zone: UTC+1 (CET)
  - Summer (DST): UTC+2 (CEST)
- Postal code: 785 01
- Website: www.mutkov.cz

Mutkov (German: Mauzendorf) is a municipality and village in Olomouc District in the Olomouc Region of the Czech Republic. It has about 50 inhabitants.

== Demographics ==
Historical population
| Year | Pop. | ±% |
|---|---|---|
| 1869 | 293 | — |
| 1880 | 306 | +4.4% |
| 1890 | 301 | −1.6% |
| 1900 | 299 | −0.7% |
| 1910 | 257 | −14.0% |
| 1921 | 231 | −10.1% |
| 1930 | 228 | −1.3% |
| 1950 | 81 | −64.5% |
| 1961 | 65 | −19.8% |
| 1970 | 36 | −44.6% |
| 1980 | 13 | −63.9% |
| 1991 | 22 | +69.2% |
| 2001 | 38 | +72.7% |
| 2011 | 51 | +34.2% |
| 2021 | 48 | −5.9% |
Source: Censuses
