= Domašov u Šternberka =

- Municipality
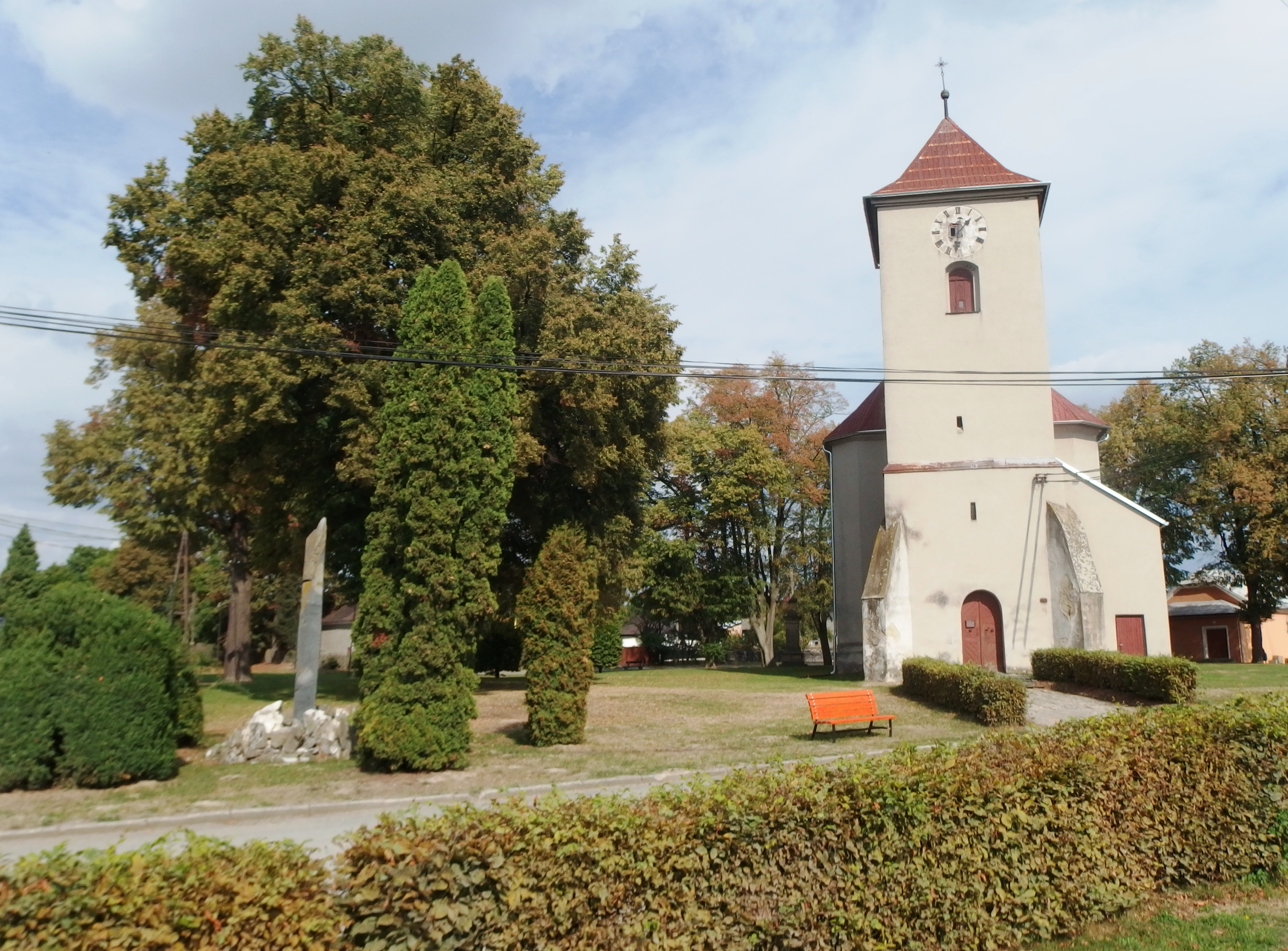
- Church of Saint Martin

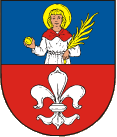
- Flag Coat of arms

- Location in the Czech Republic
- Coordinates: 49°42′21″N 17°20′17″E
- Country: Czech Republic
- Region: Olomouc
- District: Olomouc
- First mentioned: 1220

Area
  - Total: 11.78 km^{2} (4.55 sq mi)
- Elevation: 437 m (1,434 ft)

Population (2026-01-01)
  - Total: 345
  - Density: 29.3/km^{2} (75.9/sq mi)
- Time zone: UTC+1 (CET)
  - Summer (DST): UTC+2 (CEST)
- Postal code: 785 01
- Website: www.domasovusternberka.cz

Domašov u Šternberka (German: Domeschau) is a municipality and village in Olomouc District in the Olomouc Region of the Czech Republic. It has about 300 inhabitants.

Domašov u Šternberka lies approximately 14 kilometres (9 mi) north-east of Olomouc and 214 km (133 mi) east of Prague.

== Demographics ==
Historical population
Year	Pop.	±%
1869	504	—
1880	491	−2.6%
1890	488	−0.6%
1900	535	+9.6%
1910	561	+4.9%
1921	504	−10.2%
1930	504	+0.0%
1950	318	−36.9%
1961	283	−11.0%
1970	266	−6.0%
1980	269	+1.1%
1991	277	+3.0%
2001	280	+1.1%
2011	290	+3.6%
2021	318	+9.7%
Source: Censuses
