= Zahrádka =

Zahrádka may refer to:

== Places in the Czech Republic ==
- Zahrádka (Plzeň-North District), a municipality and village in the Plzeň Region
- Zahrádka (Třebíč District), a municipality and village in the Vysočina Region
- Zahrádka, a village and part of Čachrov in the Plzeň Region
- Zahrádka, a village and part of Čížkov (Plzeň-South District) in the Plzeň Region
- Zahrádka, a village and part of Kostelec nad Vltavou in the South Bohemian Region
- Zahrádka, a village and part of Maršovice (Benešov District) in the Central Bohemian Region
- Zahrádka, a village and part of Mirkovice in the South Bohemian Region
- Zahrádka, a village and part of Nalžovské Hory in the Plzeň Region
- Zahrádka, a village and part of Petrovice (Příbram District) in the Central Bohemian Region
- Zahrádka, a village and part of Pošná in the Vysočina Region
- Zahrádka, a village and part of Rožmitál na Šumavě in the South Bohemian Region
- Zahrádka, a village and part of Slapsko in the South Bohemian Region
- Zahrádka, a village and part of Tábor in the South Bohemian Region
- Zahrádka, a village and part of Teplá in the Karlovy Vary Region
- Zahrádka, a village and part of Vojkov in the Central Bohemian Region

== People ==
- František Zahrádka (1930–2017), Czech anti-communist dissident
- Luke Zahradka (born 1991), Italian-American football quarterback
- Mathias Zahradka (1912–1982), Austrian weightlifter

== See also ==
- Zahrádky (disambiguation)
