= Sidonie Grünwald-Zerkowitz =

Austro-Hungarian writer, poet, translator, educator and fashion designer

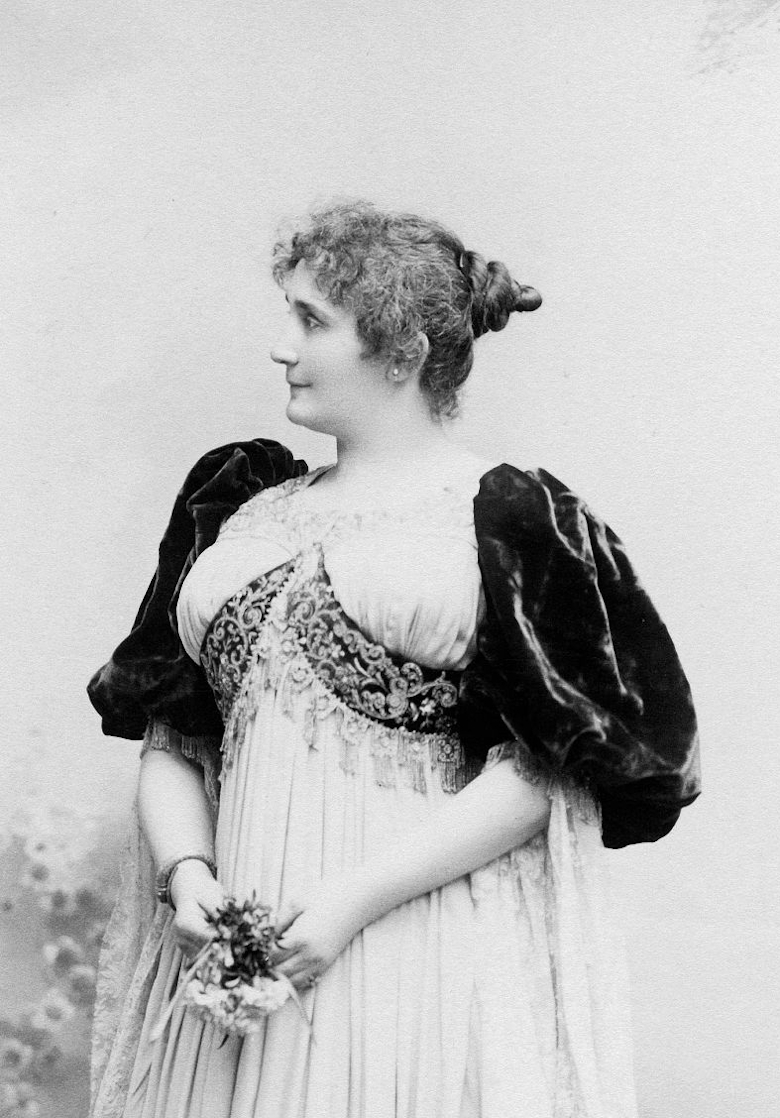
- Born: Sidonie Josepha Zerkowitz; 17 February 1852; Tobitschau, Moravia
- Died: 12 June 1907 (aged 55); Karlsbad, Bohemia
- Resting place: Vienna Central Cemetery (Jewish section)
- Spouse(s): Prince Theodore Kolokotronis (m. 1874; div. 1876) Leopold Grünwald (m. 1877; died 1890) Ferdinand Hromatka (m. 1900)
- Writing career
- Pen name: VDG

Sidonie Josepha Grünwald-Zerkowitz (17 February 1852 – 12 June 1907) was an Austro-Hungarian writer, poet, translator, educator, and fashion designer.

== Biography ==
Sidonie Zerkowitz was born into a Jewish family in Tobitschau, Moravia (now in the Czech Republic), the daughter of Jeanette (née Knopfelmacher) and Gerson Zerkowitz. An ancestor on her father's side was a banker to Emperor Rudolf II in Prague. She received her early education from her father, a physician, becoming well-versed in German, French, Italian, Hungarian, Czech, and English. With her parents she moved to Holleschau, where she studied at a normal school. She later briefly attended boarding school in Vienna. Zerkowitz thereupon came to Budapest, and before long passed the final state examination to teach Hungarian history and language.

Zerkowitz wrote lyrical poems, essays and pedagogical articles in Hungarian for the daily and belletristic papers in Budapest, becoming well known in literary circles. Her pedagogical articles, which attracted the attention of Minister of Education Ágoston Trefort, advocated for reforms of the higher state institutions for girls in Hungary.

In November 1874, after teaching at a municipal school for a few years, she received from Ludwig II of Bavaria a free scholarship at his theatrical school in Munich. Her studies were interrupted the following month by her marriage to Prince Theodore Kolokotronis of Greece, grandson of Theodoros Kolokotronis and great-grandson of Prince John Caradja. (She had previously turned down a marriage proposal from the poet Kálmán Tóth.) Joining the Greek Byzantine Catholic Church, she accompanied her husband to Athens, where both she and her husband were disowned by the latter's family. The marriage was an unhappy one, and she soon fled Greece to her parents in Holleschau.

In order to earn a living, she gave up her plan to become an actress, left her newborn child in the care of her parents and took a job as a teacher in the village of Winau. In 1877, after securing a divorce, she re-converted to Judaism and married the wealthy Vienna merchant and widower Leopold Grünwald, with whom she bore five more children.

In Vienna, she became a fashion designer and edited the French and German fashion magazine La Mode. She lectured extensively on women's fashion in Vienna and Constantinople, and, after her husband's death in 1890, she took over the management of a Viennese language school.

== Work ==
When only thirteen years of age she published her first essays on literature, in German and Hungarian, in the newspapers of Budapest.

In 1887 she anonymously published Die Lieder der Mormonin ('Songs of a Mormoness'), a verse novel printed in the format of a 4-metre-long Torah scroll. The work follows the sexual awakening of the protagonist as she enters a Mormon plural marriage. Though the book was banned in Austria as pornographic, by 1900, at least seven editions had appeared in print. Das Gretchen von Heute, a volume of erotic poetry, was subject to an obscenity trial soon after its release, and subsequently banned across the Austrian Empire.

In other publications, she took a stand against anti-Semitism, and promoted women's education and independence. Her Wie verheiratet man mitgiftlose Mädchen? (1905), for instance, argued for the creation of 'dowry funds' akin to pension and sick funds.

Other works by Grünwald-Zerkowitz included Zwanzig Gedichte von Koloman Tóth (Vienna, 1874), translated from Hungarian; Die Mode in der Frauenkleidung (Vienna, 1889); Das Gretchen von Heute (Zurich, 1890); Achmed's Ehe (1900); Doppel-Ehen (1900); Poetischer Hirt (1901); and Schattenseiten des Frauenstudiums (1901). She contributed many articles to newspapers; among those contributed to the Berlin Bühne und Welt included "Toilettenkünstlerinnen auf der Bühne", and critical essays on Sarah Bernhardt, Wolter, Dusé, Réjane, and Jane Hading, among others.

=== Partial bibliography ===
- Zwanzig Gedichte von Koloman Tóth (Tóth Kálmán) [Twenty Poems by Kálmán Tóth] (in German). Vienna: Verlag von L. Rosner. 1874.
- Die Lieder der Mormonin [Songs of a Mormoness] (PDF) (in German). Leipzig: Verlag von Hermann Dürfelen. 1888.
- Die Mode in der Frauenkleidung [Fashion in Women's Clothing] (in German). Vienna: Verlag von Georg Szelinski. 1889.
- Achmeds Ehe. Aus dem Harem. Erzählungen [Ahmed's Marriage / From the Harem] (in German). Dresden: E. Pierson's Verlag. 1899.
- Doppelehen! [Bigamy!] (in German). Zürich: Verlag von Caesar Schmidt. 1900.
- Das Gretchen von heute [The Gretchen of Today] (PDF) (in German). Zürich: Verlag von Caesar Schmidt. 1900.
- Die Schattenseiten des Frauenstudiums: Vortrag [The Downsides of Women's Studies] (in German). Zurich: Schmidt. 1902.
- "Möcht' dir gefallen" . Die zehnte Muse (in German). Berlin: Otto Eisner: 87. 1904 – via Wikisource. Set to music by Otto Wick.
- Wie verheiratet man mitgiftlose Mädchen? [How to Marry Dowryless Girls] (PDF) (in German). Vienna: K. k. Universitäts-Buchhandlung Georg Szelinski. 1905.
- Eheweh. Eine häßliche Geschichte von Alletag (in German). Vienna: Verlag von Georg Szelinski. 1906.
