= Častotice =

- Village
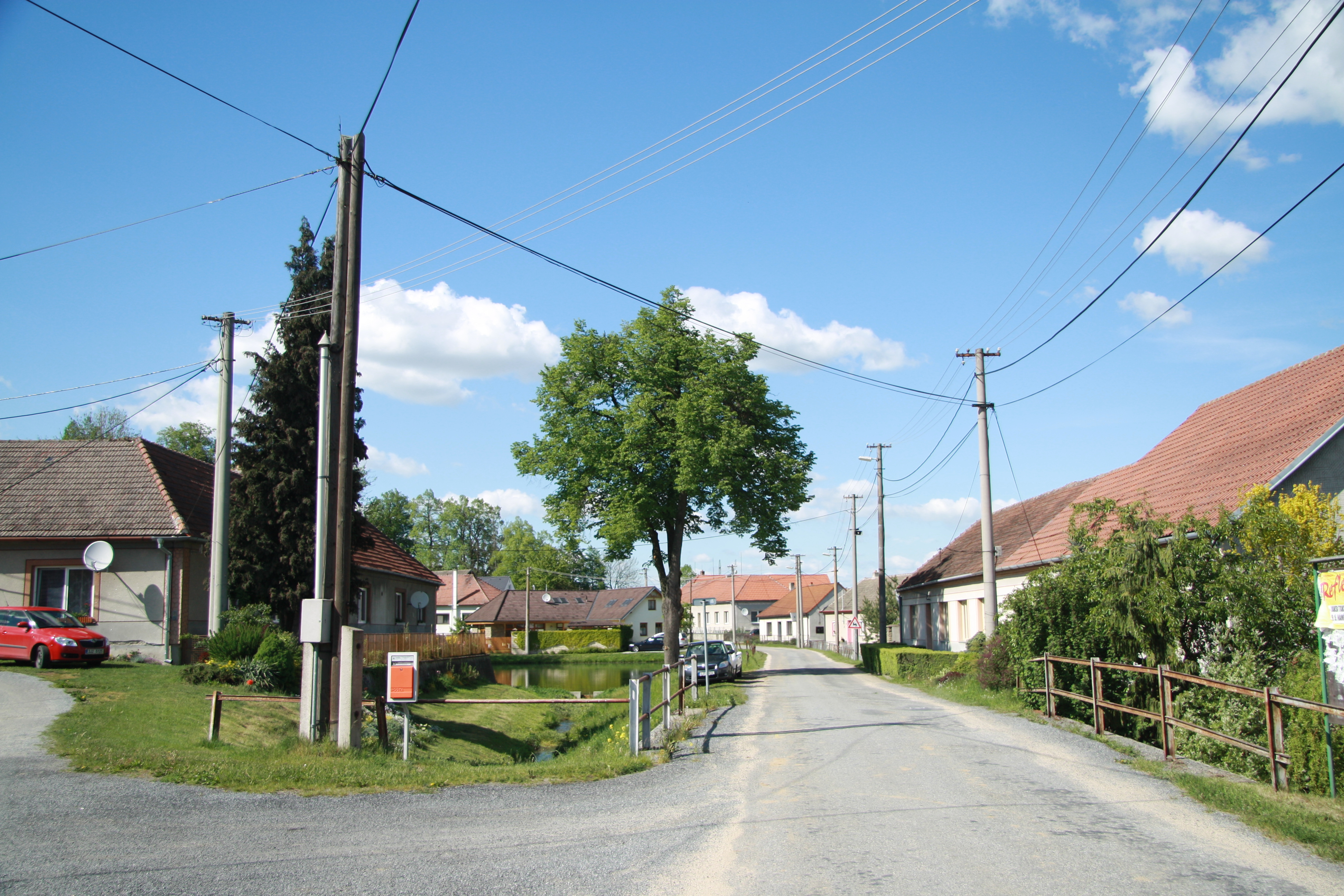
- Centre of Častotice

- Location in the Czech Republic
- Coordinates: 49°14′0″N 16°5′30″E
- Country: Czech Republic
- Region: Vysočina
- District: Třebíč
- Municipality: Zahrádka
- First mentioned: 1353

Area
  - Total: 2.83 km^{2} (1.09 sq mi)
- Elevation: 420 m (1,380 ft)

Population (2021)
  - Total: 53
  - Density: 19/km^{2} (49/sq mi)
- Time zone: UTC+1 (CET)
  - Summer (DST): UTC+2 (CEST)
- Postal code: 675 71

Častotice is a village and administrative part of Zahrádka in Třebíč District in the Vysočina Region of the Czech Republic. It has about 50 inhabitants.

== Geography ==
Častotice is located about 15 kilometres (9 mi) east of Třebíč, in the southern part of the municipality of Zahrádka. It lies on the border between the Jevišovice Upland and Křižanov Highlands. The stream Častotický potok flows through the village. There are three fishponds in the territory of Častotice: Dubovec, Stejskal and Častotický pozdní.

== Transport ==
The I/23 road from Třebíč to Rosice runs along the southern border of the territory of Častotice.

The railway from Brno to Třebíč also runs through the southern part of Častotice; however, there is no train station.
