= Rudolf Bereza =

Czech dissident (1942–2014)

- Born: 1942; Tovačov, Protectorate of Bohemia and Moravia
- Died: 2014 (aged 71–72)
- Occupation: Bus driver
- Known for: Signatory of Charter 77

Rudolf Bereza (1942–2014) was a Czech dissident. He was best known for letters he wrote to President Gustáv Husák and holding a banner in support of Charter 77.

== Biography ==
Rudolf Bereza was born in 1942 in Tovačov, in what is today the Czech Republic. Growing up, he didn’t resist the Communist Regime. But in 1968, the armies of the Warsaw Pact invaded. This is the event that sparked him into dissident activities. He signed Charter 77 and began to deliver Samizdat documents for the Resistance. He was close with Tomáš Hradilek with whom Bereza participated in many resistance activities. They are both well known for a letter they wrote to President Gustáv Husák titled "A Letter by Five Workers." In this letter, they asked the President to abdicate. One of the rebellious activities Bereza is most famous for is when he and others held a banner in Olomouc that read “Charter 77 calls for civic courage.” He also wrote another letter to President Husák asking him to let political prisoners free and this letter was broadcast on Radio Free Europe. During his time of dissidence, he was arrested and brought in for questioning many times. The StB even wiretapped his house. After the Velvet Revolution, Bereza was involved in the countries move from communism to democracy. He was involved in the Czech National Council for the Civic Forum and worked as a police chief and bus driver.

Even though he is not that well known, a few Czech organizations have interviewed him to document his story, like Post Bellum.
