= Zahrádky =

Zahrádky may refer to places in the Czech Republic:

- Zahrádky (Česká Lípa District), a municipality and village in the Liberec Region
- Zahrádky (Jindřichův Hradec District), a municipality and village in the South Bohemian Region
- Zahrádky, a hamlet and part of Borová Lada in the South Bohemian Region

== See also ==
- Zahrádka (disambiguation)
