= Post Bellum =

Czech educational non-profit organization

- Post Bellum z. ú.
- Formation: 2001
- Purpose: memorial
- Headquarters: Španělská 1073/10, 120 00 Prague 2 - Vinohrady
- Director and Founder: Mikuláš Kroupa
- Director of Operations: Jan Polouček
- Website: https://www.postbellum.cz/international/

Post Bellum is a Czech educational nonprofit organization based in Prague. The organization was formed in 2001 by a group of historians and journalists with the aim of increasing public knowledge of the 20th century history of the Czech Republic and neighboring countries, especially among younger generations. Post Bellum has collected thousands of witness accounts by conducting interviews with people who lived through significant periods in history as part of their documentation project, Stories of the 20th Century, and for their online archive, Memory of Nations. They organize various other projects and activities to raise awareness of modern history. The stated aim of the organisation is to "understand the past through authentic testimony". Post Bellum is an associate member of the Platform of European Memory and Conscience.

== Memory of Nations ==
The organisation has created an archive of oral historical testimony entitled Memory of Nations, in partnership with the Institute for the Study of Totalitarian Regimes and Czech Radio. The archive is the largest online collection of testimonies in Central Europe, documenting the stories of "war veterans, Holocaust survivors, political prisoners, as well as members of the Communist Party, the Secret Police, and the People’s Militias". Witnesses are interviewed in their original language, then translated into English. The interviews are then archived online, where they can be browsed using different categories, dates, places, and so on, in order to locate anecdotes and interviews regarding specific events. Initially, Czech Radio provided the technical support to carry out the interviews and witness recordings, which were made exclusively in audio form and were available in wav or mp3 formats. In 2014, the organisation began using Eye Direct technology to record the testimonies. As of May 2025, there are 19,455 witnesses in the database, 10,872 published stories, as well as over 160,000 images and 65,000 clips.

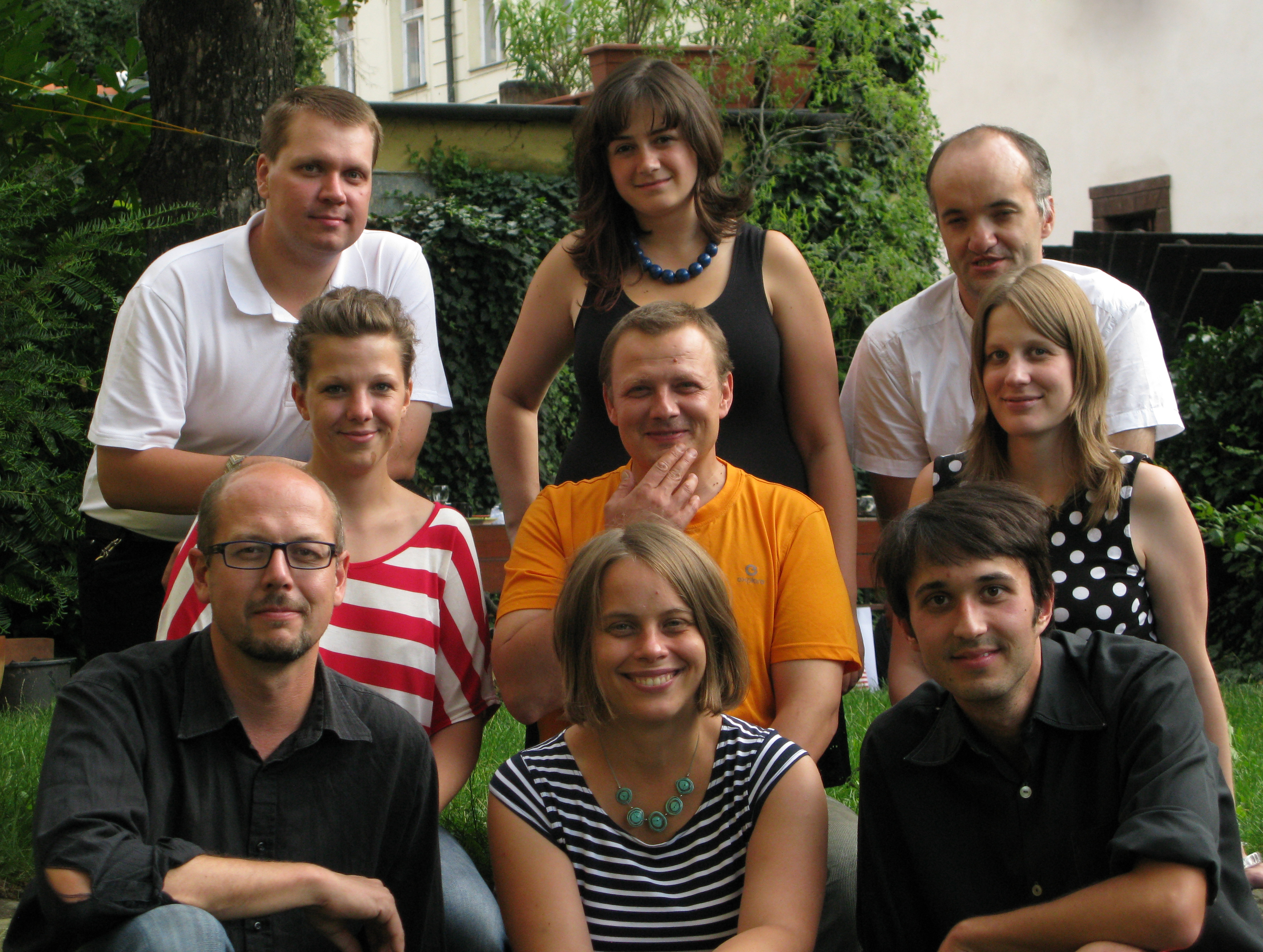
Post Bellum team in 2013.

Notable people who have provided testimony for the database include Václav Havel, Helga Hošková-Weissová, Petr Pithart, Vladimir Oravsky, Magdaléna Vášáryová, Milan Knížák, František Zahrádka, Felix Kolmer, and Rudolf Bereza.

== The Memory of Nations Awards ==
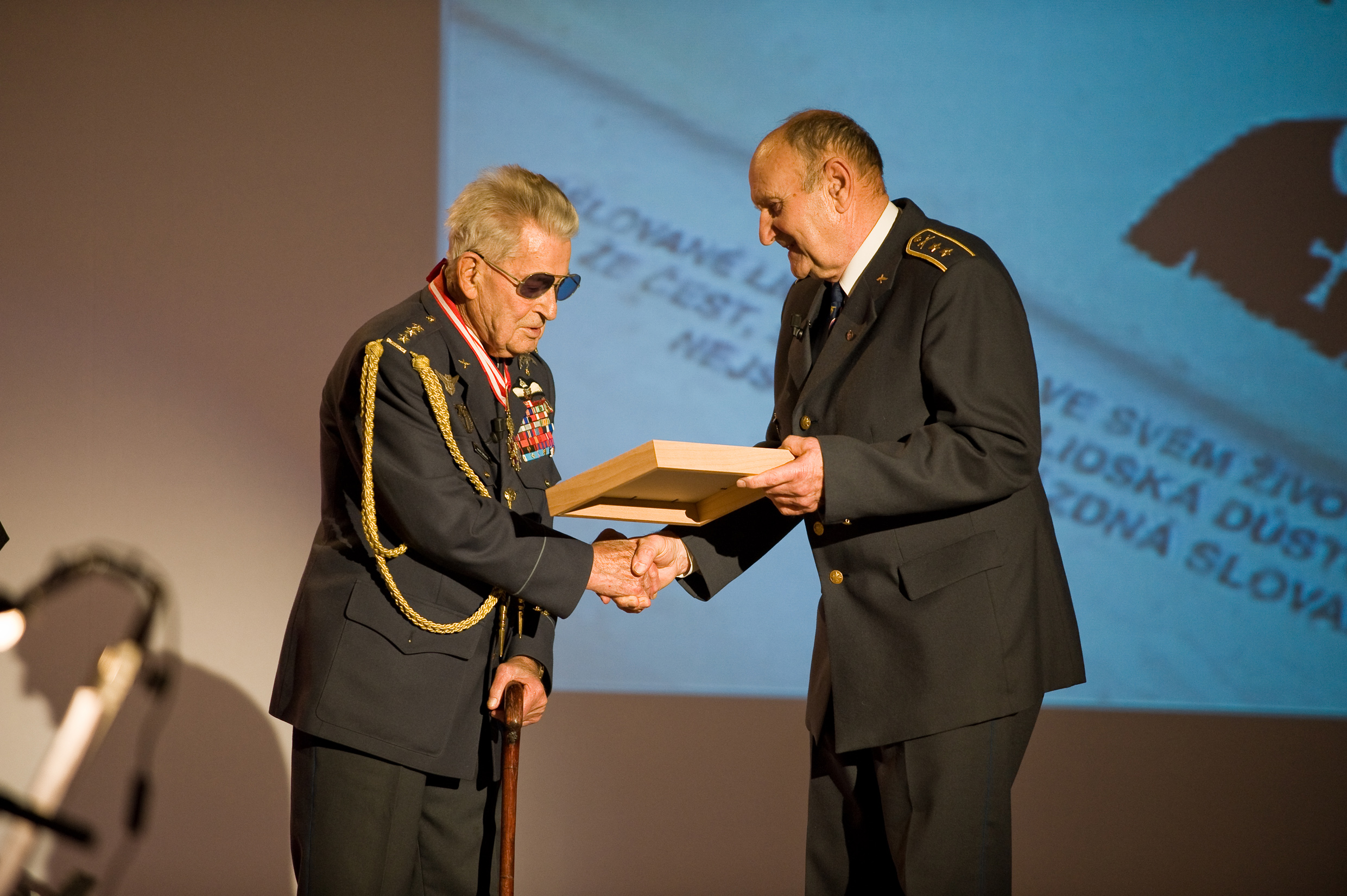
In 2011, the Memory of Nations Award was received by aviator Imrich Gablech.

Since 2010, Post Bellum has annually presented the Memory of Nations Awards (Ceny Paměti národa), to recognise individuals who have demonstrated exceptional courage and integrity in resisting totalitarian regimes, defending human rights, and upholding democratic values. Recipients include war veterans, political prisoners, resistance fighters, Holocaust survivors, dissidents, and other individuals who resisted oppressive regimes during the 20th century.

Each year, five laureates are selected from a pool of 20 nominees by a panel comprising historians, journalists, and public figures. The awards ceremony takes place on November 17, coinciding with the anniversary of the Velvet Revolution, and is typically held at the National Theatre in Prague. The event is broadcast live on Czech Television and features artistic performances, documentary segments, and readings that highlight the stories of the honorees.

== The Run for Memory of Nations ==
Established in 2016, the Run for Memory of Nations (Běh pro Paměť národa) is an annual charitable running event organized by Post Bellum to honor individuals who resisted totalitarian regimes and to support the documentation of their testimonies. The registration fees collected are used to fund Post Bellum's work to record, edit, and publish personal testimonies.

Participants can choose to join the run from various cities across the Czech Republic or virtually from any location worldwide. Participants are encouraged to dedicate their run to a specific individual whose story is published on the Memory of Nations archive.

== Stories from the 20th Century ==
Stories from the 20th Century is a radio show telling witnesses' stories from Post Bellum's Memory of Nations archive, that has aired every Sunday since 2006 on Czech Radio. The people interviewed include war veterans, Holocaust survivors, political prisoners of Nazi and Communist times, and members of minority groups.

Stories from the 20th Century was also the name of a documentary series that aired on Czech Television, focused on life during Normalization. The series featured interviews with StB agents, miners, members of the Communist party, gay people, and black market currency dealers.

Some episodes were adapted into books by the authors of the programme, Mikuláš Kroupa and Adam Drda. In 2008, the book Cruel Century (Czech: Kruté století) was published, followed in 2009 by the publication We didn't want to live under communism (Czech: V komunismu jsme žít nechtěli). In 2014 and 2015, the authors contributed to the Unknown heroes (Czech: Neznámí hrdinové) book series.

== Educational initiatives ==
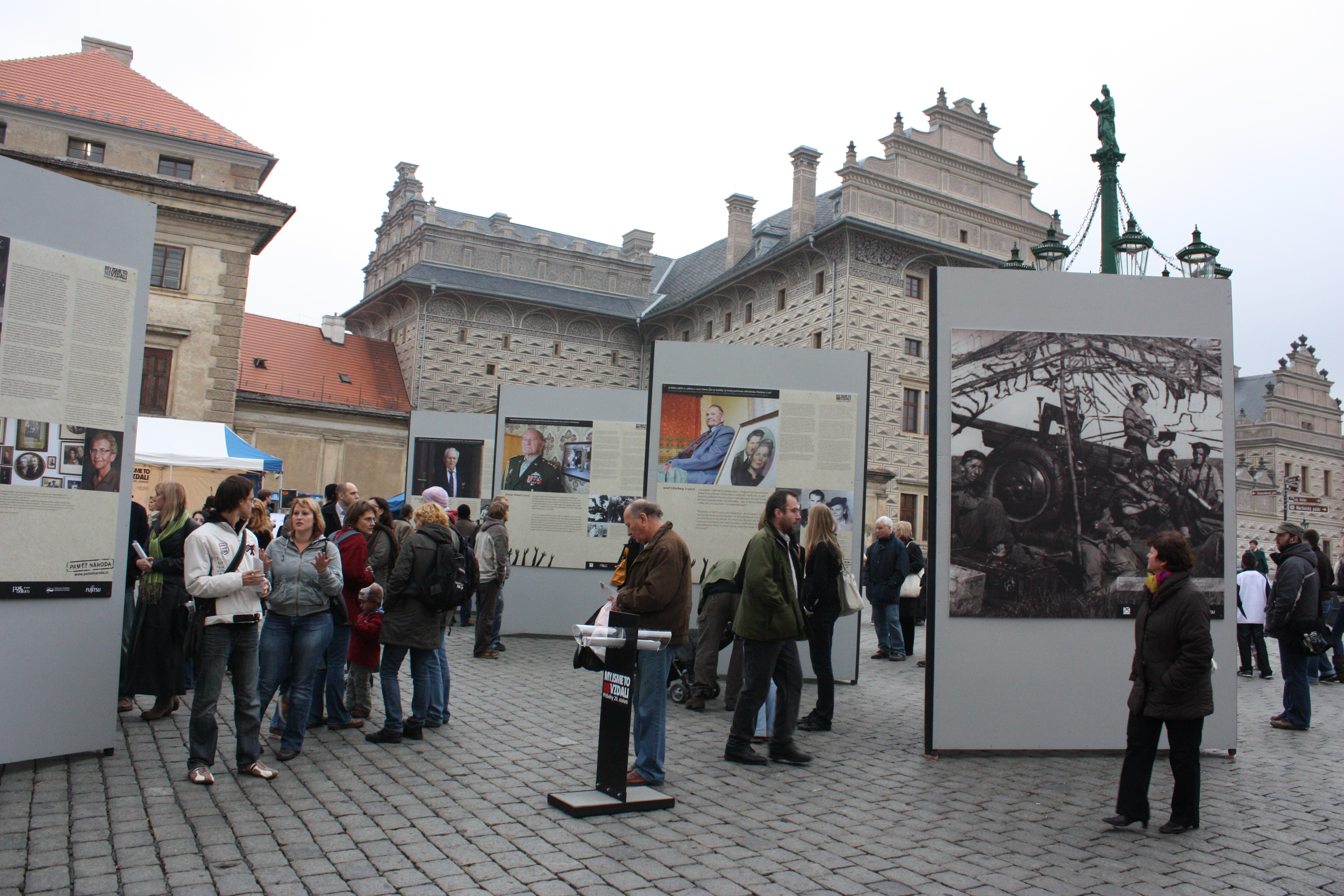
Open Air Exposition opening organised in 2009 by Post Bellum in Prague.

Post Bellum is involved with a number of initiatives aimed at increasing public knowledge of totalitarian regimes, especially among young people. Through the Memory of Nations Schools Network, they use witness testimonies as part of workshops in which students are encouraged to think critically about historical events.

Among these educational initiatives are Experience Workshops, which involve immersive, dramatized simulations in which students role-play historical figures and navigate scenarios from key moments in modern Czech history, such as the Communist coup of 1948 or the Normalization period. These workshops help participants better understand the moral dilemmas faced by individuals living under authoritarian regimes.

'Stories of Our Neighbors' is a long-term educational program in which students interview and document the life stories of eyewitnesses from their own communities, which are then retold through radio or TV. Students also conduct outside research into the witnesses' experiences, which is then presented together with the testimony.

Additionally, Post Bellum has published a number of educational books such as We Are Still At War and Forced Labour, graphic novels based on true stories of people affected by totalitarian regimes.

Post Bellum also maintains resources and professional development programs for educators, including lesson plans, workshops, and an online database of testimonies which can be used to support history teaching.

== Memory of Nations Institutes ==
Memory of Nations Institutes (MNI) are multimedia exhibitions about the totalitarian regimes of the 20th century, based on the testimonies of those who directly experienced them from the Memory of Nations archives.

The first MNI was inaugurated on 15 March 2022 in Pardubice. The institute's core exhibition is "Quiet Heroes", which narrates stories from the 20th century using a blend of projections, unconventional effects, augmented reality, and interactive displays. The exhibition immerses visitors in World War II alongside two witnesses, Jaryna Mlchová and Tomáš Sedláček, and also includes three themed workshops: "Jews in the Protectorate," "The Second Resistance," and "Political Prisoners." The second MNI opened on 22 March 2022 in Olomouc, with an audiovisual exhibit entitled "Revealed Stories of the 20th Century", highlighting the stories of five witnesses to the Second World War and the Communist era in the Olomouc Region.

Later that year, another MNI was inaugurated in Brno. Post Bellum held 47 public events at the institute's city-center location at Radnická 10, including discussions featuring war veteran Roman Kopřiva, author Pavel Kosatík, and historian Denisa Nečasová. During autumn 2022, debates were convened with three of the candidates in the 2023 Czech presidential election: Danuše Nerudová, Marek Hilšer, and Pavel Fischer.

== Other activities ==
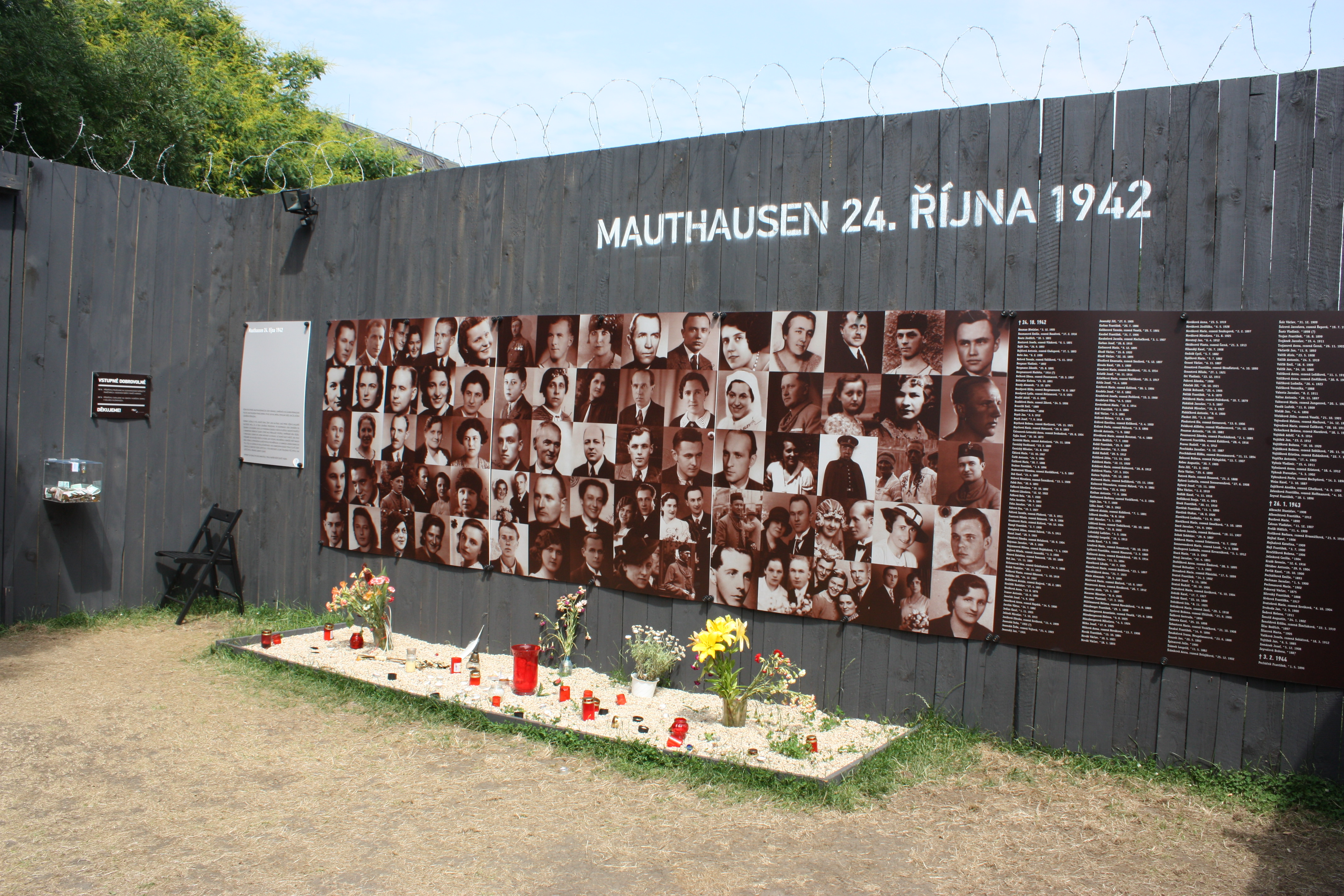
Replica of Mauthausen Concentration camp in Charles Square, Prague, 2012.

Post Bellum has also documented witnesses in other parts of the world, such as the United States, Poland, and Israel. They have partnerships with the Visegrad Fund and the German Foundation Remembrance, Responsibility and Future (EVZ) to record witness testimonies, and, in 2017, began a partnership with Florida International University to document the testimonies of Cuban dissidents.

Post Bellum has put on about 128 exhibitions all around Europe. In May–July 2012, they built a replica of Mauthausen-Gusen concentration camp in Charles Square in Prague as part of an exhibition to commemorate the 70th anniversary of the assassination of Reinhard Heydrich.

After the Russian invasion of Ukraine, Memory of Nations launched a crowdfunding campaign to provide military equipment and aid to the Ukrainian army. Testimonies of the conflict were also recorded and collected.
