= Felix Kolmer =

Czech physicist (1922–2022)

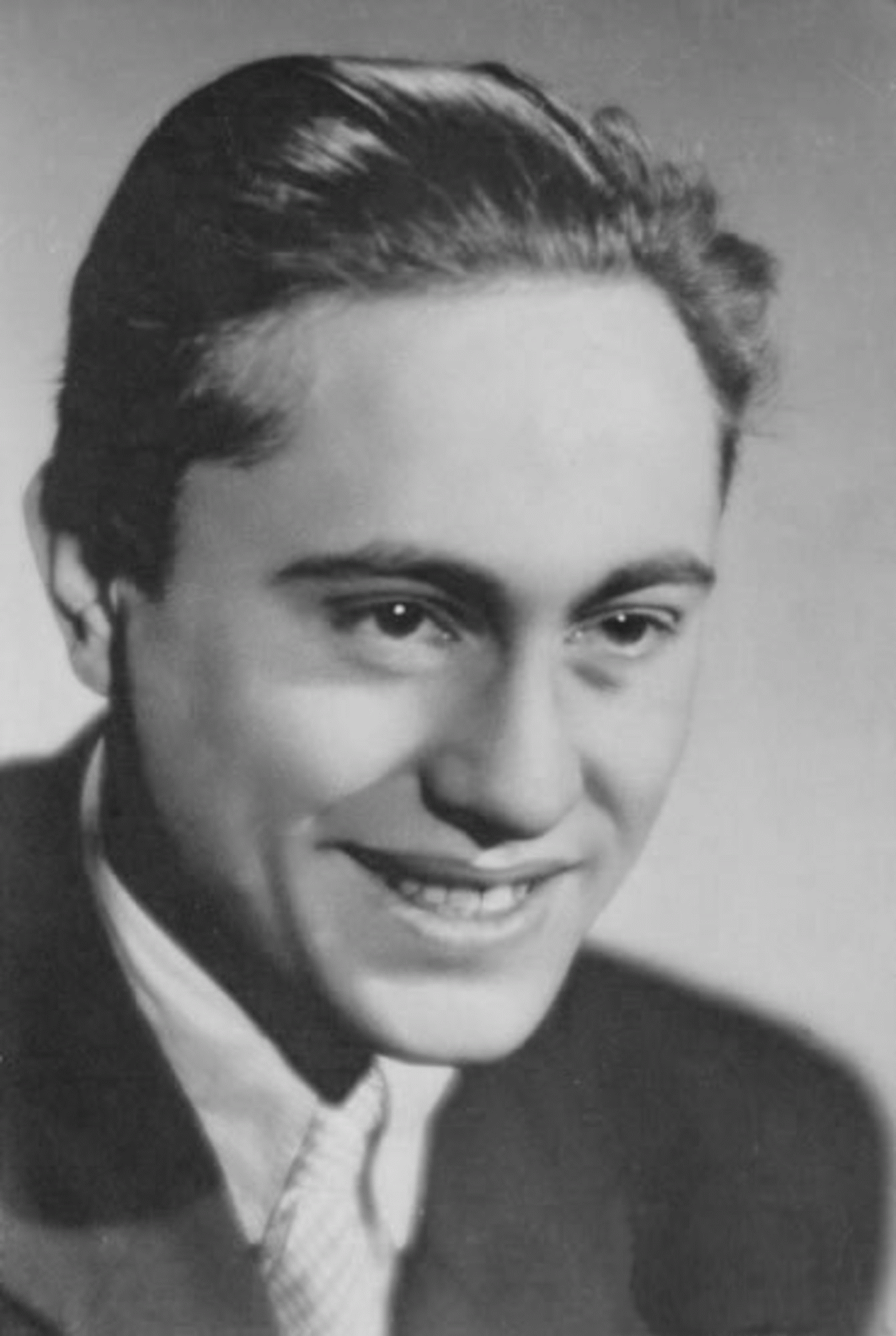
- Kolmer in 1940
- Born: 3 May 1922; Prague, Czechoslovakia (now Czech Republic)
- Died: 5 August 2022 (aged 100)
- Citizenship: Czech
- Occupation: Physicist

Felix Kolmer (3 May 1922 – 5 August 2022) was a Czech Holocaust survivor and physicist, specialising in the field of acoustics. During the Second World War, he was active in the Czech Resistance.

== Early life ==
Kolmer was born in Prague in 1922 to an assimilated Jewish family. His father died in 1932, and he subsequently spent holidays in Austria with his uncle. As a result, he was in Austria during the 1938–1945 Nazi invasion and occupation of Czechoslovakia.

== In Terezín ==
Kolmer was selected to be part of the Aufbaukommando, the first transportation to Terezín. The transport contained young able-bodied Jewish men, with the intention that the men would assist in building the ghetto. In Terezín, he was specifically forced to build bunk beds, since he had carpentry experience. At one point, he was interned in the Small Fortress, and the treatment of prisoners by the SS that he witnessed there prompted him to join the underground resistance. He found an escape route out of Terezín, but never used it; the route was used by a few prisoners later. He was able to use his Aufbaukommando status to temporarily protect some of his family members, including his grandmother, mother, and fiancée. His mother died in Terezín in 1941.

== Deportation to Auschwitz and escape ==
In October 1944, Kolmer was sent to Auschwitz-Birkenau. According to his later recollections, he arrived on a transport with 1,500 people, 1,250 of whom were immediately sent to the gas chambers by Josef Mengele. Kolmer only survived this initial selection because a prisoner he did not know told the Nazis he was a metal worker. He managed to escape Auschwitz by jumping on a transport with a friend, which headed to the Gross-Rosen camp, specifically the subcamp Friedland.

== Later life ==
After the war, Kolmer worked as an electrical engineer, and became an expert on acoustics. Kolmer began lecturing not only in his field of expertise, but also on World War II. He received several awards for his resistance, scientific research, and bravery. He also assisted victims of the Nazis who are seeking compensation. He was interviewed by Post Bellum, an oral history organisation, as part of their project Stories of the 20th Century.

Kolmer turned 100 in May 2022, and died on 5 August.
