= Tovačov =

- Town
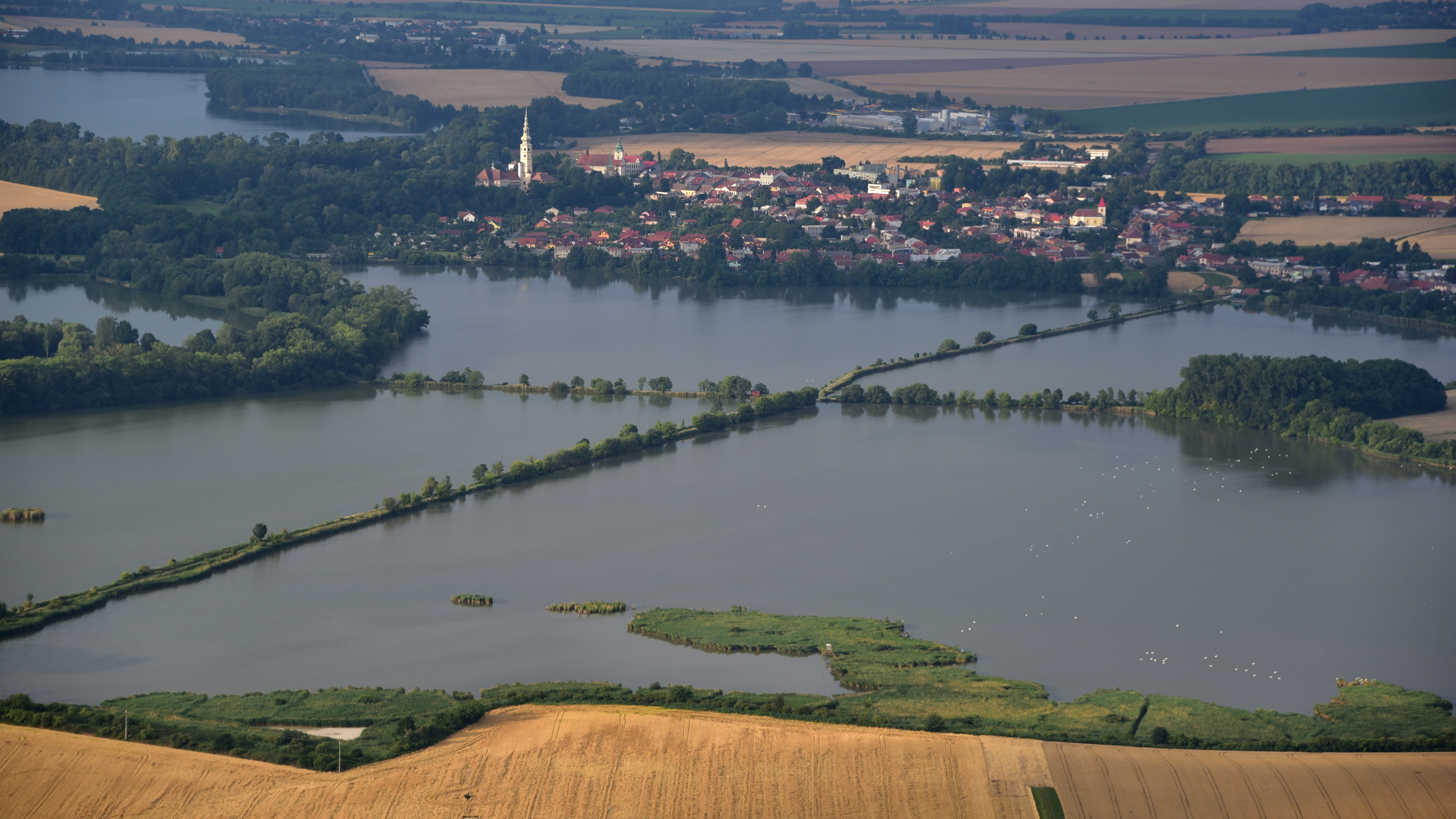
- View across the fishpond Hradecký rybník

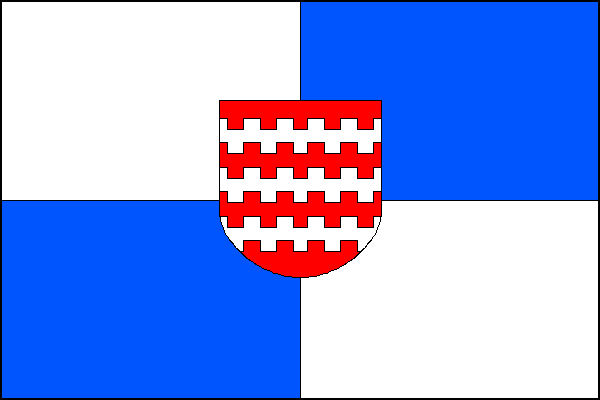
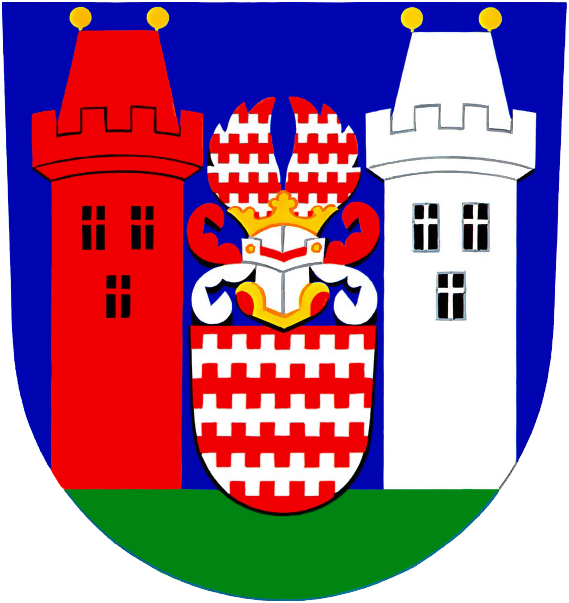
- Flag Coat of arms

- Location in the Czech Republic
- Coordinates: 49°25′51″N 17°17′17″E
- Country: Czech Republic
- Region: Olomouc
- District: Přerov
- First mentioned: 1203

Government
  - Mayor: Marek Svoboda

Area
  - Total: 22.77 km^{2} (8.79 sq mi)
- Elevation: 201 m (659 ft)

Population (2025-01-01)
  - Total: 2,472
  - Density: 108.6/km^{2} (281.2/sq mi)
- Time zone: UTC+1 (CET)
  - Summer (DST): UTC+2 (CEST)
- Postal code: 751 01
- Website: www.tovacov.cz

Tovačov (Czech pronunciation: [ˈtovatʃof]; German: Tobitschau) is a town in Přerov District in the Olomouc Region of the Czech Republic. It has about 2,500 inhabitants. The town is located in the Upper Morava Valley between the rivers Morava and Blata and is surrounded by several fishponds and artificial lakes.

Tovačov is considered the oldest Renaissance town in the Czech Republic. The historic town centre is well preserved and is protected as an urban monument zone. The main landmark of the town is the Tovačov Castle.

== Administrative division ==
Tovačov consists of two municipal parts (in brackets population according to the 2021 census):

- Tovačov I-Město (2,305)
- Tovačov II-Annín (116)

== Geography ==
Tovačov is located about 11 kilometres (7 mi) west of Přerov and 12 km (7 mi) east of Prostějov. It lies in the Upper Morava Valley. The Morava River flows through the eastern part of the municipal territory. The Bečva River flows into the Morava near Tovačov. The Blata River flows through the western part of Tovačov and joins the Morava just outside the municipal territory. The Mlýnský náhon (also called Boleloucký náhon; a canal that connects the Morava with the Blata) flows through the town proper.

The territory of Tovačov is rich in water bodies. There is a system of four fishponds on the Mlýnský náhon. The fishpond Hradecký rybník is the largest water body in Tovačov. In the vicinity of the confluences of the Morava with the Bečva and Blata, there are four artificial lakes created in the 1950s after gravel mining. Together they have an area of more than 330 hectares (820 acres).

== History ==
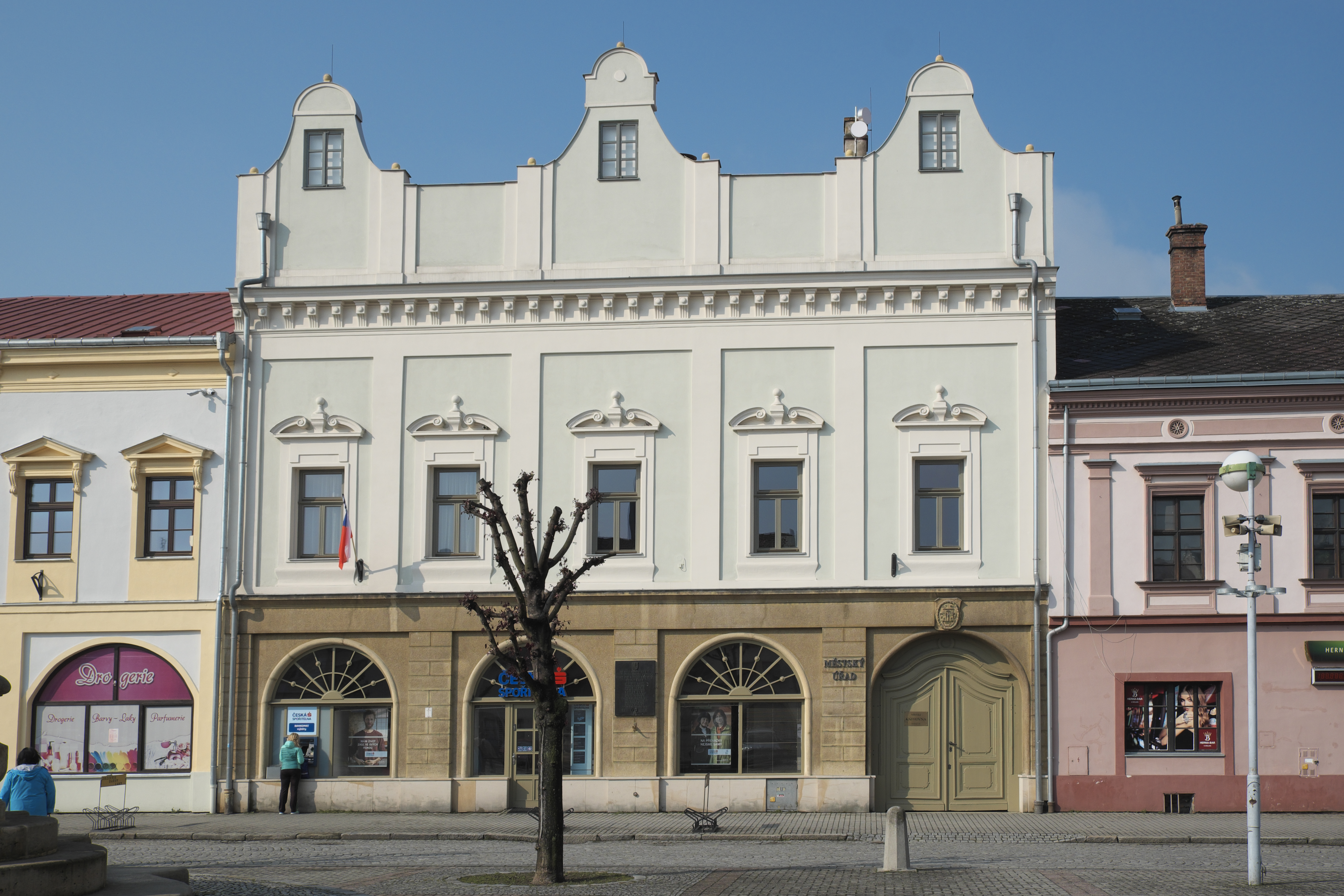
Town hall

The first written mention of Tovačov is from 1203. Shortly after its founding, it became an important crossroads of trade routes leading along the local rivers. The most notable owners of the Tovačov estate were the Cimburk family (1349–1502), the Pernštejn family (1503–1597), the Salm family (1600–1715), and the Küenburg family (1763–1887).

The first ponds were founded here in 1464 by Jan Tovačovský of Cimburk. During the rule of the Pernštejns, another ponds were founded. The ponds were damaged in the Thirty Years' War and abolished in the 18th century. They were partially renewed after World War II.

Tovačov is the site of a minor battle in the Austro-Prussian War. On 16 July 1866, the Prussians defeated the Austrians in the Battle of Tobitschau.

== Demographics ==
Historical population

| Year | Pop. | ±% |
|---|---|---|
| 1869 | 1,895 | — |
| 1880 | 2,749 | +45.1% |
| 1890 | 2,632 | −4.3% |
| 1900 | 2,924 | +11.1% |
| 1910 | 3,096 | +5.9% |

| Year | Pop. | ±% |
|---|---|---|
| 1921 | 2,991 | −3.4% |
| 1930 | 2,771 | −7.4% |
| 1950 | 2,466 | −11.0% |
| 1961 | 2,610 | +5.8% |
| 1970 | 2,765 | +5.9% |

| Year | Pop. | ±% |
|---|---|---|
| 1980 | 2,817 | +1.9% |
| 1991 | 2,656 | −5.7% |
| 2001 | 2,666 | +0.4% |
| 2011 | 2,515 | −5.7% |
| 2021 | 2,421 | −3.7% |

Source: Censuses

== Transport ==
Tovačov is the start of a short railway line to Chropyně. Trains run on it only on weekends during the summer season.

== Sights ==
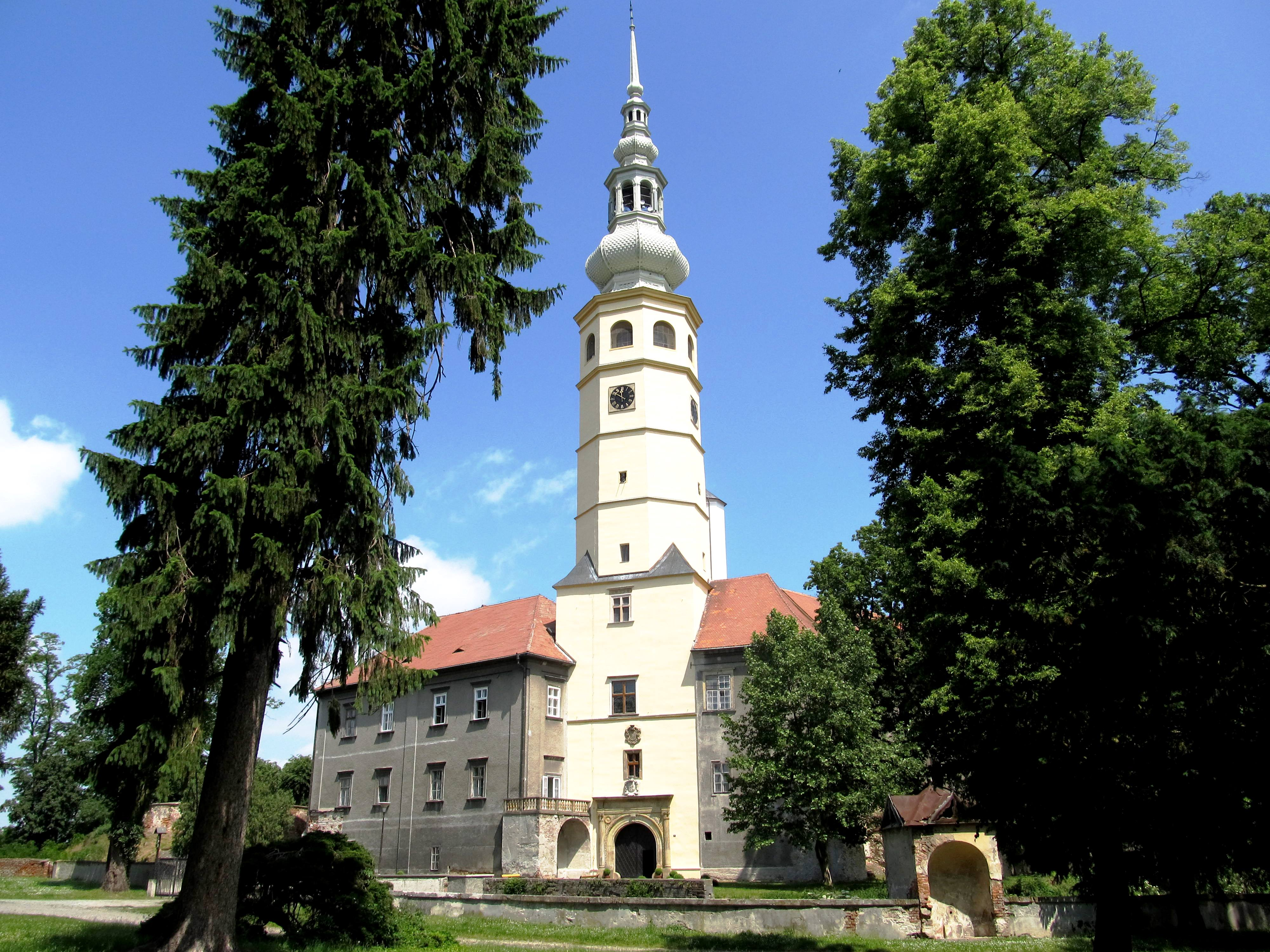
Tovačov Castle

The town can be characterised as the oldest Renaissance urban establishment in the country. The town square was founded in 1475. Among the most valuable monuments is the town hall with a Renaissance portal. The fountain on the town square is from 1692.

The main landmark is the Tovačov Castle. It was originally a fortress from the second half of the 11th century and later a water fortress, rebuilt by the Cimburk family in the 15th century. The castle tower was finished in 1492 and is 92 metres (302 ft) high. Its Renaissance portal from the same year is the oldest Renaissance monument north of the Alps.

The synagogue from the 15th century and the Jewish cemetery belong to the oldest in the Czech Republic. Today the former synagogue serves as a prayer house of the Czechoslovak Hussite Church.

There is the Memorial of the Battle of Tobitschau near Hradecký rybník.

== Notable people ==
- Sidonie Grünwald-Zerkowitz (1852–1907), Austrian writer, poet and fashion designer
- Ferdinand Steiner (1884–1968), artistic gymnast
- Hugo Kauder (1888–1972), Austrian composer and pedagogue
- Klement Slavický (1910–1999), composer
- Rudolf Bereza (1942–2014), dissident
