= Únanov =

- Municipality
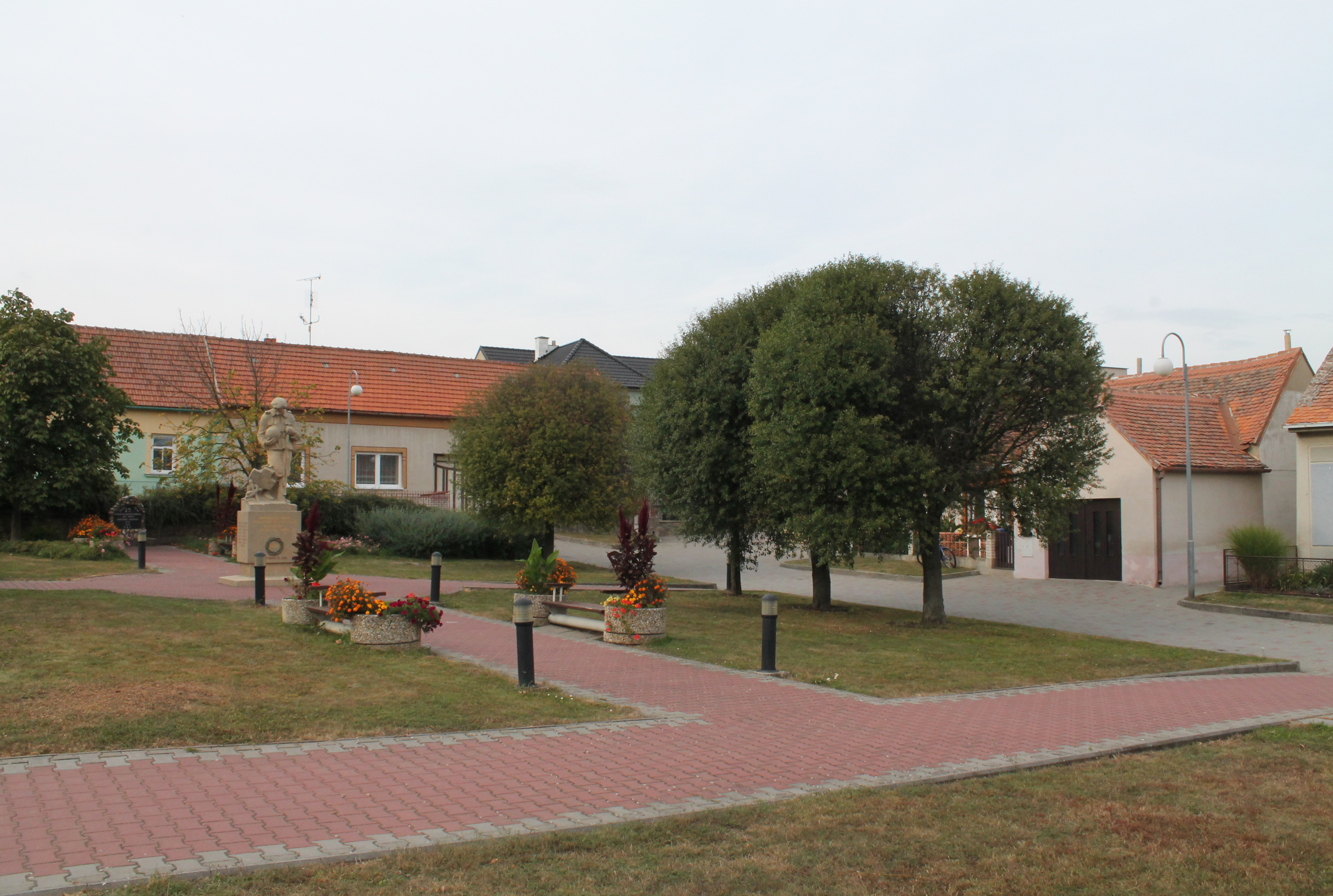
- Centre of Únavov

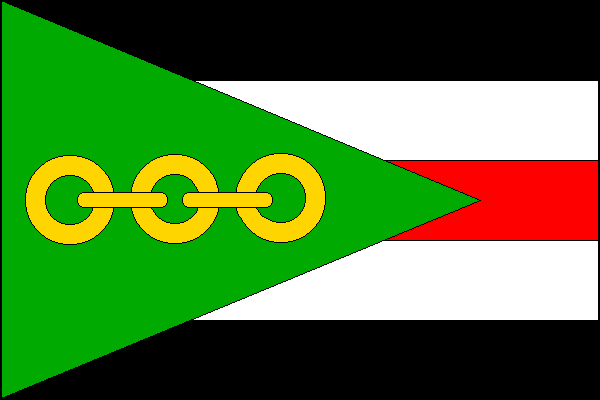
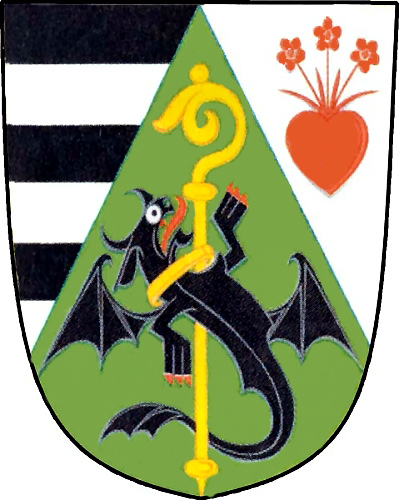
- Flag Coat of arms

- Location in the Czech Republic
- Coordinates: 48°54′3″N 16°3′49″E
- Country: Czech Republic
- Region: South Moravian
- District: Znojmo
- First mentioned: 1227

Area
  - Total: 12.15 km^{2} (4.69 sq mi)
- Elevation: 290 m (950 ft)

Population (2026-01-01)
  - Total: 1,282
  - Density: 105.5/km^{2} (273.3/sq mi)
- Time zone: UTC+1 (CET)
  - Summer (DST): UTC+2 (CEST)
- Postal code: 671 31
- Website: www.obecunanov.cz

Únanov (German: Winau) is a municipality and village in Znojmo District in the South Moravian Region of the Czech Republic. It has about 1,300 inhabitants.

Únanov lies approximately 7 kilometres (4 mi) north of Znojmo, 53 km (33 mi) south-west of Brno, and 178 km (111 mi) south-east of Prague.

== Demographics ==
Historical population
Year	Pop.	±%
1869	745	—
1880	752	+0.9%
1890	865	+15.0%
1900	935	+8.1%
1910	991	+6.0%
1921	889	−10.3%
1930	1,067	+20.0%
1950	1,065	−0.2%
1961	1,104	+3.7%
1970	1,073	−2.8%
1980	1,127	+5.0%
1991	1,114	−1.2%
2001	1,108	−0.5%
2011	1,135	+2.4%
2021	1,291	+13.7%
Source: Censuses
