= Zahrádka (Třebíč District) =

- Municipality
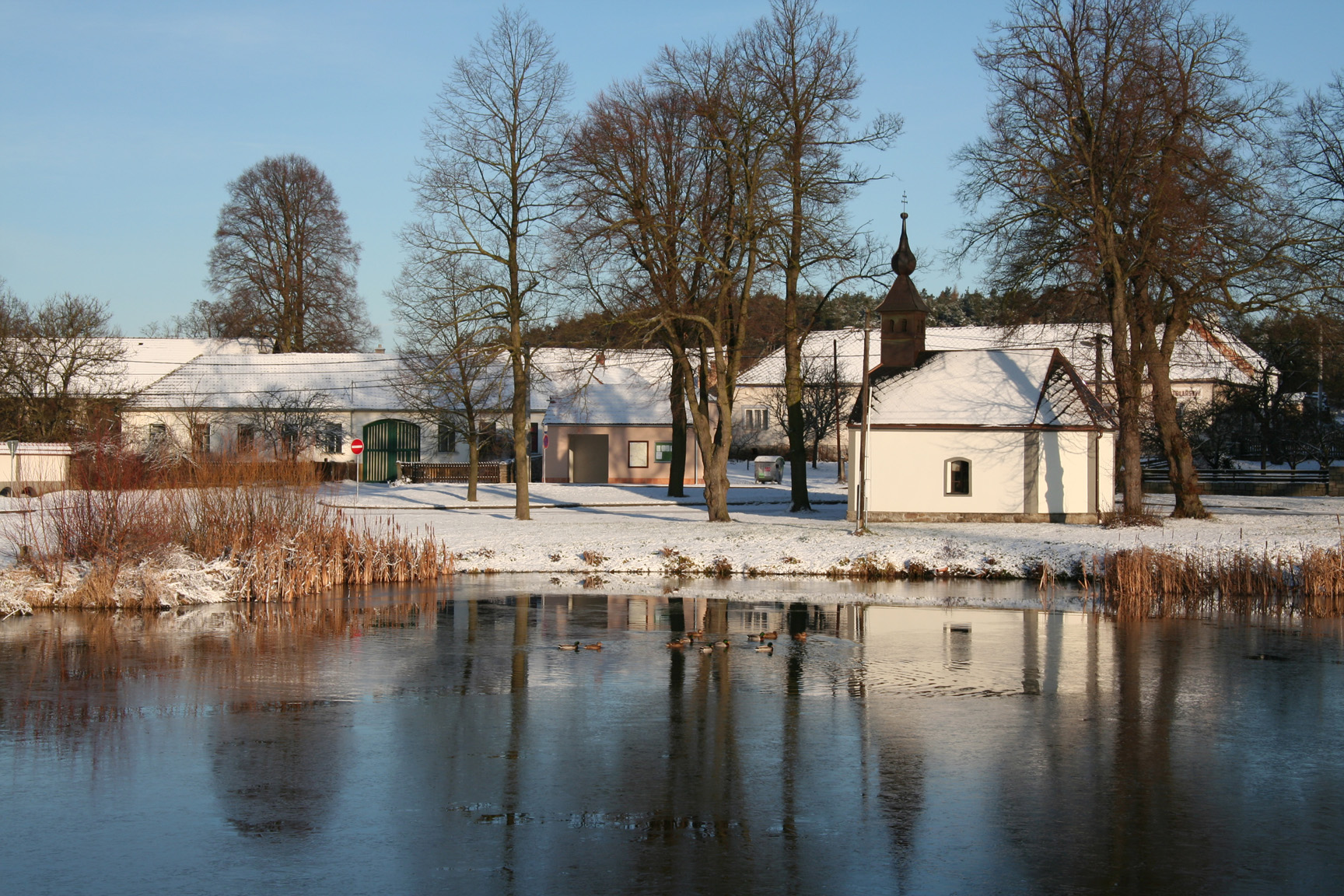
- Centre of Zahrádka

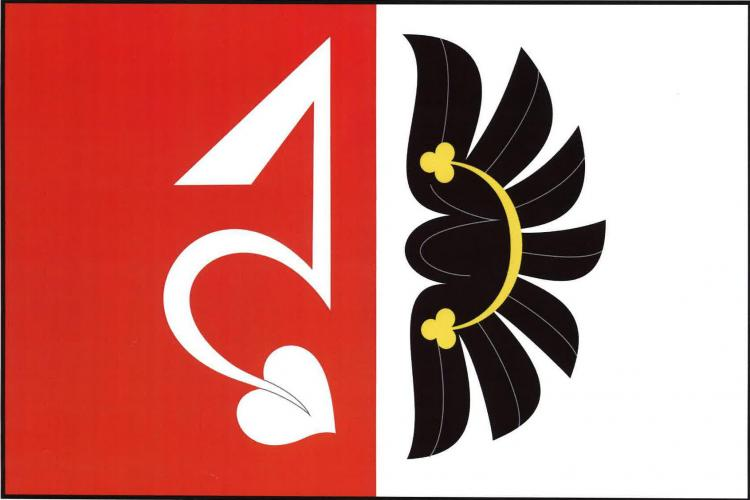
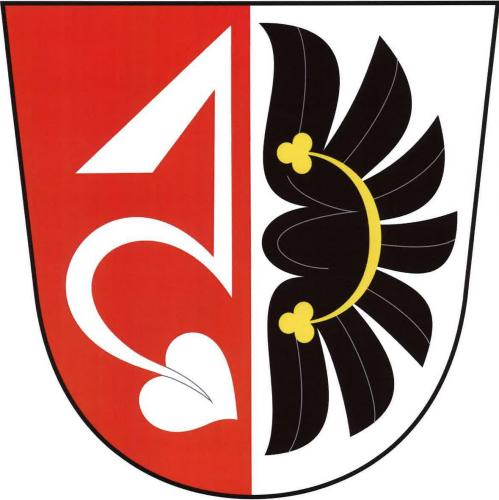
- Flag Coat of arms

- Location in the Czech Republic
- Coordinates: 49°14′40″N 16°5′54″E
- Country: Czech Republic
- Region: Vysočina
- District: Třebíč
- First mentioned: 1353

Area
  - Total: 7.15 km^{2} (2.76 sq mi)
- Elevation: 415 m (1,362 ft)

Population (2026-01-01)
  - Total: 137
  - Density: 19.2/km^{2} (49.6/sq mi)
- Time zone: UTC+1 (CET)
  - Summer (DST): UTC+2 (CEST)
- Postal code: 675 71
- Website: www.obec-zahradka.cz

Zahrádka is a municipality and village in Třebíč District in the Vysočina Region of the Czech Republic. It has about 100 inhabitants.

Zahrádka lies approximately 17 kilometres (11 mi) east of Třebíč, 41 km (25 mi) south-east of Jihlava, and 153 km (95 mi) south-east of Prague.

== Administrative division ==
Zahrádka consists of two municipal parts (in brackets population according to the 2021 census):

- Zahrádka (80)
- Častotice (53)

== Demographics ==
Historical population
| Year | Pop. | ±% |
|---|---|---|
| 1869 | 232 | — |
| 1880 | 232 | +0.0% |
| 1890 | 234 | +0.9% |
| 1900 | 262 | +12.0% |
| 1910 | 232 | −11.5% |
| 1921 | 227 | −2.2% |
| 1930 | 229 | +0.9% |
| 1950 | 186 | −18.8% |
| 1961 | 203 | +9.1% |
| 1970 | 172 | −15.3% |
| 1980 | 164 | −4.7% |
| 1991 | 141 | −14.0% |
| 2001 | 128 | −9.2% |
| 2011 | 130 | +1.6% |
| 2021 | 133 | +2.3% |
Source: Censuses
