= František Zahrádka =

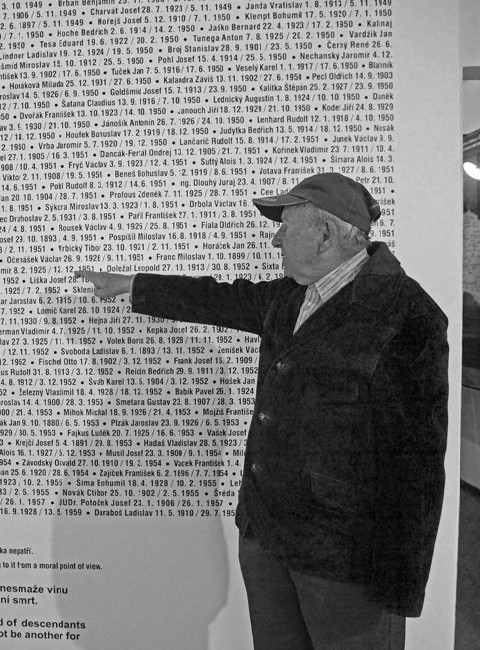
- Born: 30 October 1930; Děčín, Czechoslovakia
- Died: 15 December 2017 (aged 87); Czech Republic
- Occupation: Electrician
- Years active: 1945–2017
- Organization: Scout Resistance
- Spouse: Marie Voldřichová (married 1966–1999)
- Honours: Order of Tomáš Garrigue Masaryk, Prize of the Nation

František Zahrádka (30 October 1930 – 15 December 2017) was a Czech resistance fighter. He was an active member of the Resistance against the communist regime in Czechoslovakia.

== Biography ==
=== Early life ===
František Zahrádka was born on 30 October 1930 in Děčín, Czechoslovakia to an assistant worker, his mother Kristýna, and an Army veteran, his father František. He attended grammar school in Meziměstí with his brother, Luděk. In 1938, his family was driven out of their home by Germans.

Many tragedies befell his family and him before World War II. His father's job transferred him to the Svitavy region. His brother was hit by a car and because of this his mother had a mental breakdown. Since all of this happened, Zahrádka lived in an old railway car. Right before the war broke out, his aunt invited him to live with her in Veselí nad Lužnicí where he saw the beginning of the war.

He lived with his aunt in Veselí nad Lužnicí. After the assassination of Reinhard Heydrich, Zahrádka was reunited with his family. In 1944, his parents were arrested by the Gestapo and they both returned alive near the end of the war.

The boy scouts, Junák, were re-established after World War II, which Zahrádka immediately joined in České Budějovice.

=== Anti-communist resistance and later life ===
The communists took over the newly re-established Czechoslovakia in February 1948. This is when Zahrádka made the decision to join the Scout Resistance. He assisted in helping eleven people leave Czechoslovakia illegally. He also helped produce the illegal Za Pravdu magazine. He established contacts with the American Intelligence Service and helped them connect to the resistance network in Czechoslovakia. In September 1949, the StB arrested him for these activities. He was sentenced to twenty years in prison and required to pay a fine. He served part of his time in the uranium mines in Jáchymov and other areas. He eventually went through eleven prisons and camps until his release in 1962.

In April 1966, he married Marie Voldřichová. They stayed together until her death in 1999. He also founded his local chapter of the Confederation of Political Prisoners in 1990.

Zahrádka died on 15 December 2017.

== Legacy ==
Zahrádka helped build the Museum of the Third Resistance in Příbram and a memorial to the Victims of Communism in Vojna. He received the Order of Tomáš Garrigue Masaryk for Lifetime Merit in 2007 by Václav Klaus. He also was awarded the Prize of the Nation. In the early 2000s, he was interviewed by the nonprofit Post Bellum as part of their Iron Curtain Stories Project.
