= Hrabová =

Hrabová may refer to places in the Czech Republic:

- Hrabová (Šumperk District), a municipality and village in the Olomouc Region
- Hrabová (Ostrava), a district of Ostrava

== See also ==
- Hrabová Roztoka, a municipality and village in the Prešov Region, Slovakia
