= Horní Studénky =

- Municipality
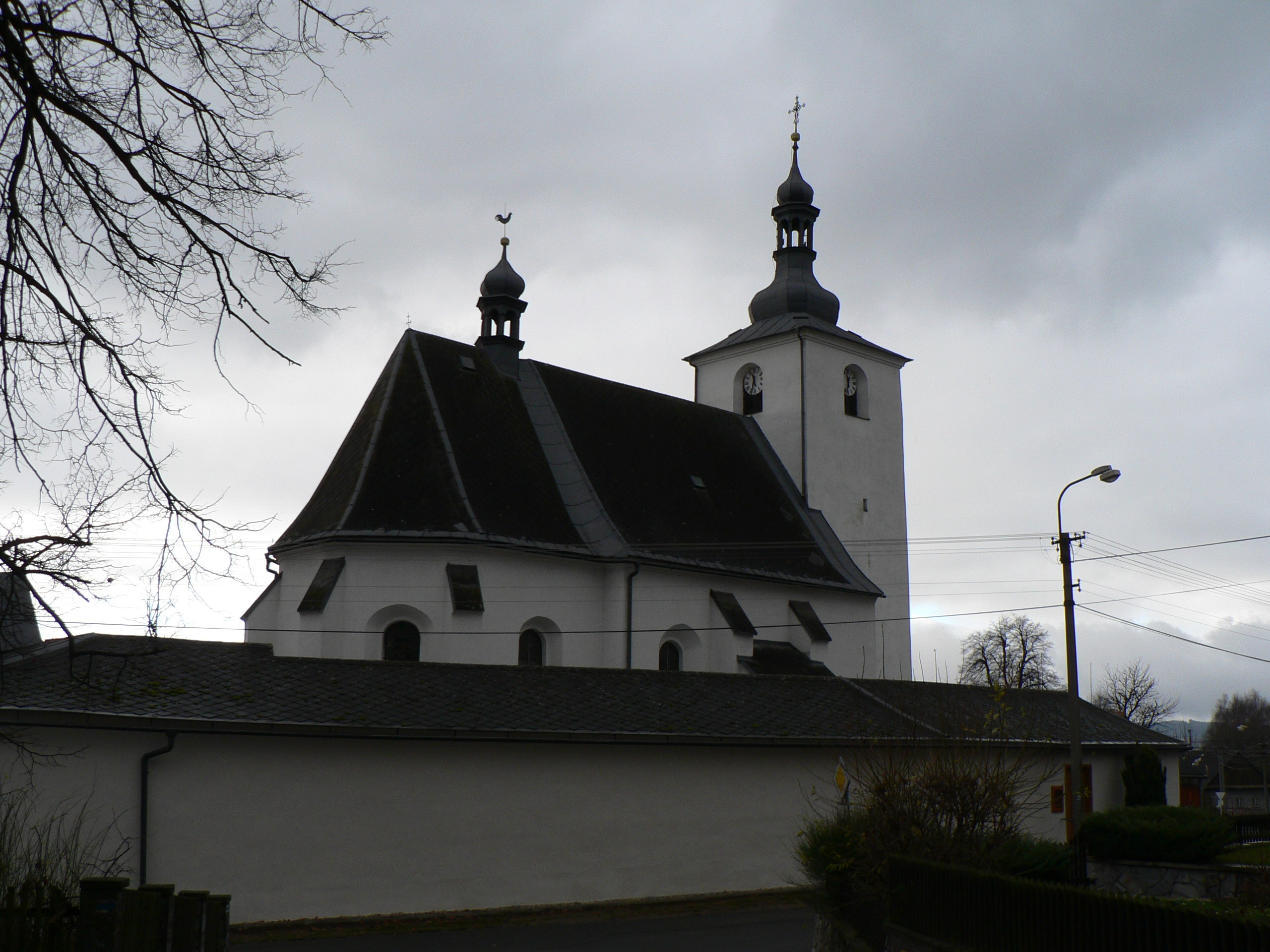
- Church of Saint Linhart

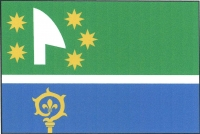
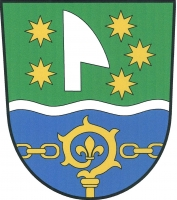
- Flag Coat of arms

- Location in the Czech Republic
- Coordinates: 49°57′10″N 16°48′43″E
- Country: Czech Republic
- Region: Olomouc
- District: Šumperk
- First mentioned: 1353

Area
  - Total: 7.24 km^{2} (2.80 sq mi)
- Elevation: 515 m (1,690 ft)

Population (2026-01-01)
  - Total: 350
  - Density: 48/km^{2} (130/sq mi)
- Time zone: UTC+1 (CET)
  - Summer (DST): UTC+2 (CEST)
- Postal codes: 789 01
- Website: www.hornistudenky.cz

Horní Studénky is a municipality and village in Šumperk District in the Olomouc Region of the Czech Republic. It has about 400 inhabitants.

== Etymology ==
The name is probably derived from the Czech word studánky (i.e. 'springs') and refers to a large number of springs flowing from the slopes around the village. There is also a theory that the name is derived from studený, i.e. 'cold'.

== Geography ==
Horní Studénky is located about 11 kilometres (7 mi) west of Šumperk and 50 km (31 mi) northwest of Olomouc. It lies in the Zábřeh Highlands. The highest point is the Pustina hill at 626 m (2,054 ft) above sea level. The Nemilka Stream originates here and flows through the municipality.

== History ==
The first written mention of Horní Studénky is from 1353.

== Demographics ==
Historical population

Year	Pop.	±%
1869	680	—
1880	671	−1.3%
1890	682	+1.6%
1900	663	−2.8%
1910	698	+5.3%

Year	Pop.	±%
1921	683	−2.1%
1930	656	−4.0%
1950	499	−23.9%
1961	478	−4.2%
1970	428	−10.5%

Year	Pop.	±%
1980	406	−5.1%
1991	347	−14.5%
2001	346	−0.3%
2011	345	−0.3%
2021	342	−0.9%

Source: Censuses

== Transport ==
There are no railways or major roads passing through the municipality.

== Sights ==
The main landmark of Horní Studénky is the Church of Saint Linhart. The original church was built shortly after the village was founded. The current building dates from 1666.
