= Dlouhomilov =

- Municipality
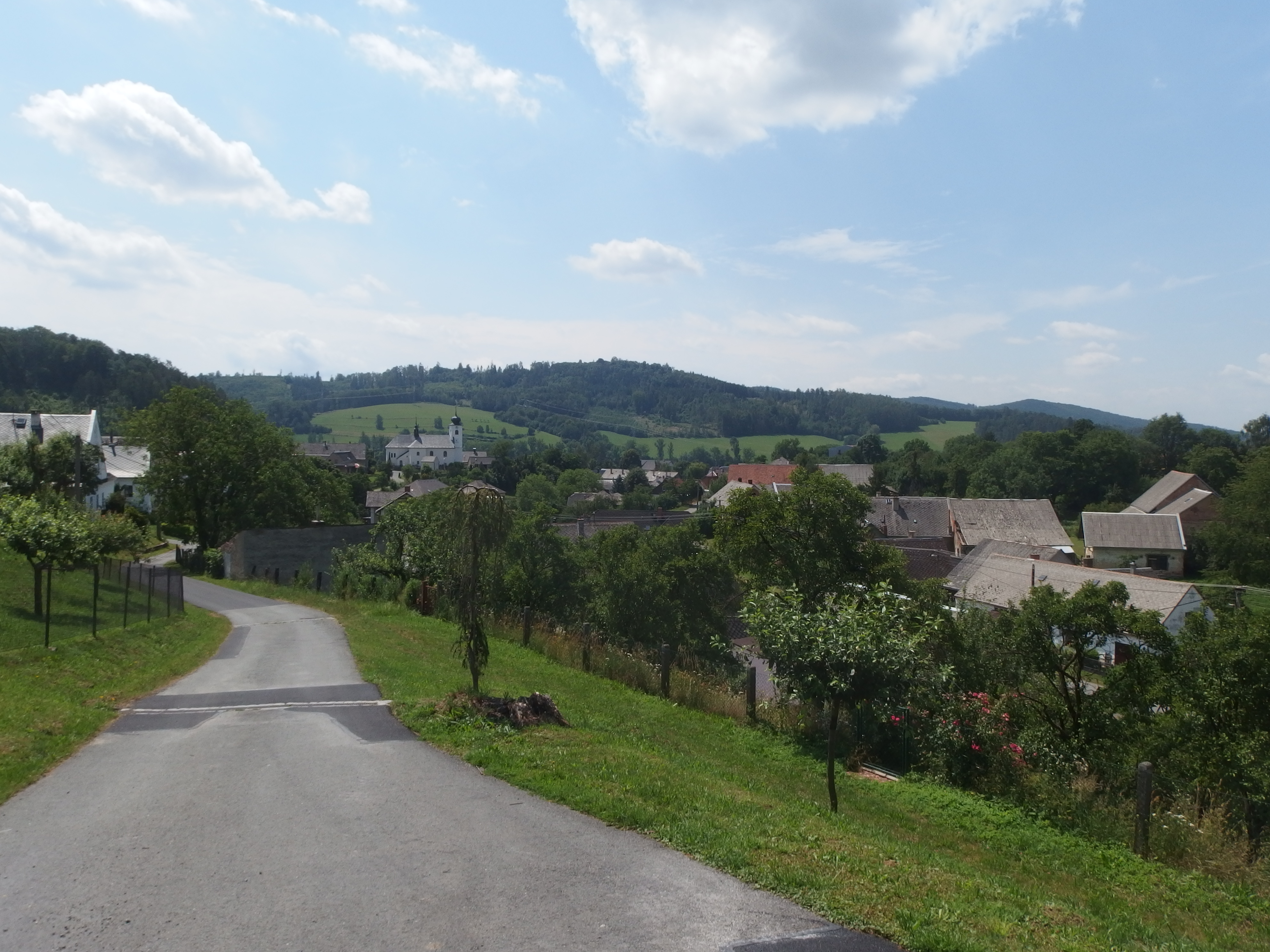
- General view

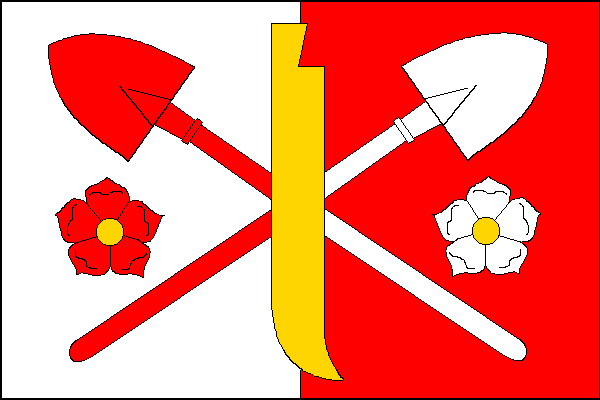
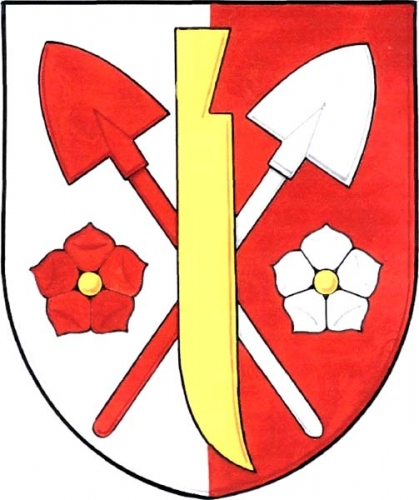
- Flag Coat of arms

- Location in the Czech Republic
- Coordinates: 49°54′25″N 16°59′29″E
- Country: Czech Republic
- Region: Olomouc
- District: Šumperk
- First mentioned: 1356

Area
  - Total: 10.44 km^{2} (4.03 sq mi)
- Elevation: 320 m (1,050 ft)

Population (2026-01-01)
  - Total: 454
  - Density: 43.5/km^{2} (113/sq mi)
- Time zone: UTC+1 (CET)
  - Summer (DST): UTC+2 (CEST)
- Postal codes: 789 76
- Website: www.dlouhomilov.cz

Dlouhomilov (German: Lomigsdorf) is a municipality and village in Šumperk District in the Olomouc Region of the Czech Republic. It has about 500 inhabitants. The historic centre is well preserved and is protected as a village monument zone.

Dlouhomilov lies approximately 7 kilometres (4 mi) south of Šumperk, 40 km (25 mi) north-west of Olomouc, and 185 km (115 mi) east of Prague.

== Administrative division ==
Dlouhomilov consists of two municipal parts (in brackets population according to the 2021 census):

- Dlouhomilov (407)
- Benkov (51)

== Demographics ==
Historical population
Year	Pop.	±%
1869	982	—
1880	982	+0.0%
1890	1,045	+6.4%
1900	1,090	+4.3%
1910	1,151	+5.6%
1921	1,031	−10.4%
1930	999	−3.1%
1950	681	−31.8%
1961	689	+1.2%
1970	598	−13.2%
1980	491	−17.9%
1991	474	−3.5%
2001	458	−3.4%
2011	465	+1.5%
2021	458	−1.5%
Source: Censuses
