= Janoušov =

- Municipality
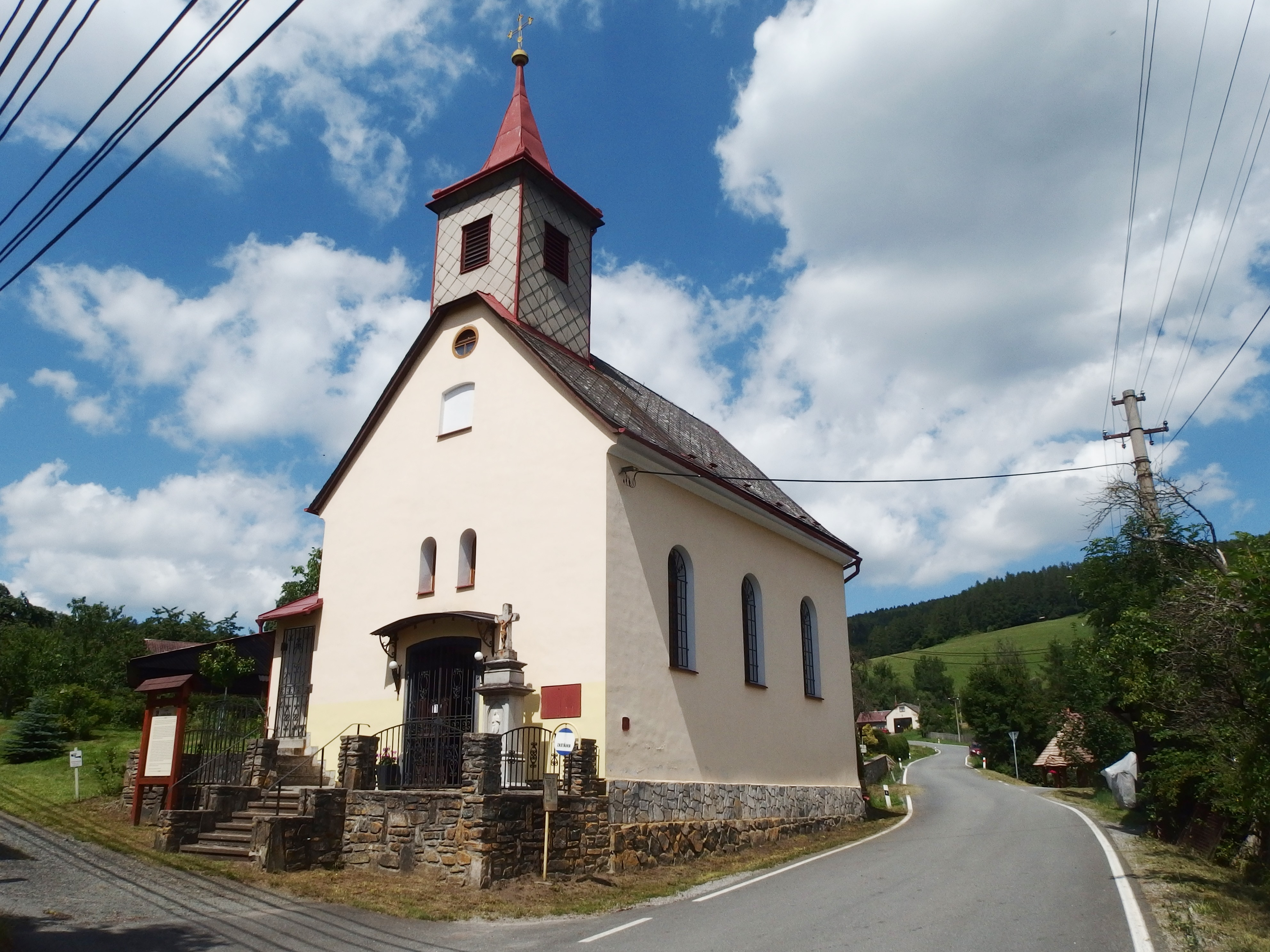
- Chapel of Saint Anne

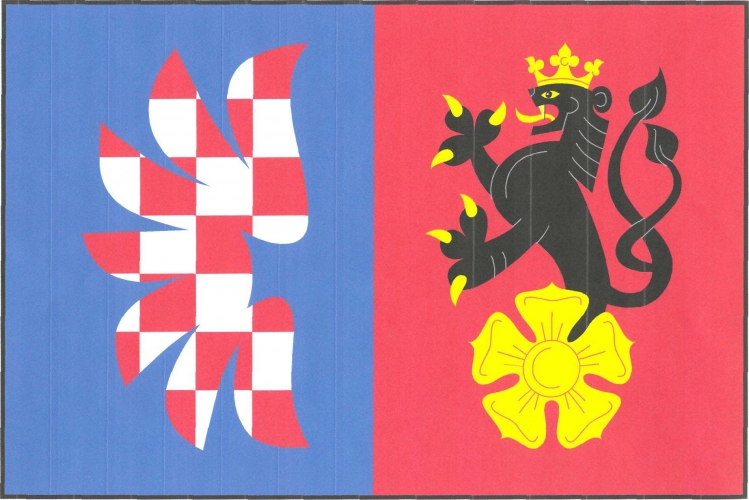
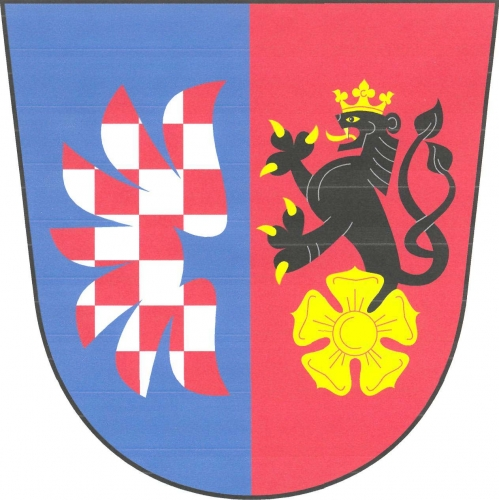
- Flag Coat of arms

- Location in the Czech Republic
- Coordinates: 50°0′47″N 16°50′43″E
- Country: Czech Republic
- Region: Olomouc
- District: Šumperk
- First mentioned: 1397

Area
  - Total: 3.07 km^{2} (1.19 sq mi)
- Elevation: 555 m (1,821 ft)

Population (2026-01-01)
  - Total: 53
  - Density: 17/km^{2} (45/sq mi)
- Time zone: UTC+1 (CET)
  - Summer (DST): UTC+2 (CEST)
- Postal codes: 789 91
- Website: www.janousov.cz

Janoušov (German: Janauschendorf) is a municipality and village in Šumperk District in the Olomouc Region of the Czech Republic. It has about 50 inhabitants.

Janoušov lies approximately 11 kilometres (7 mi) north-west of Šumperk, 56 km (35 mi) north-west of Olomouc, and 174 km (108 mi) east of Prague.

== Demographics ==
Historical population
Year	Pop.	±%
1869	400	—
1880	393	−1.7%
1890	360	−8.4%
1900	372	+3.3%
1910	359	−3.5%
1921	341	−5.0%
1930	325	−4.7%
1950	155	−52.3%
1961	138	−11.0%
1970	112	−18.8%
1980	80	−28.6%
1991	66	−17.5%
2001	54	−18.2%
2011	49	−9.3%
2021	37	−24.5%
Source: Censuses
