= Stavenice =

- Municipality
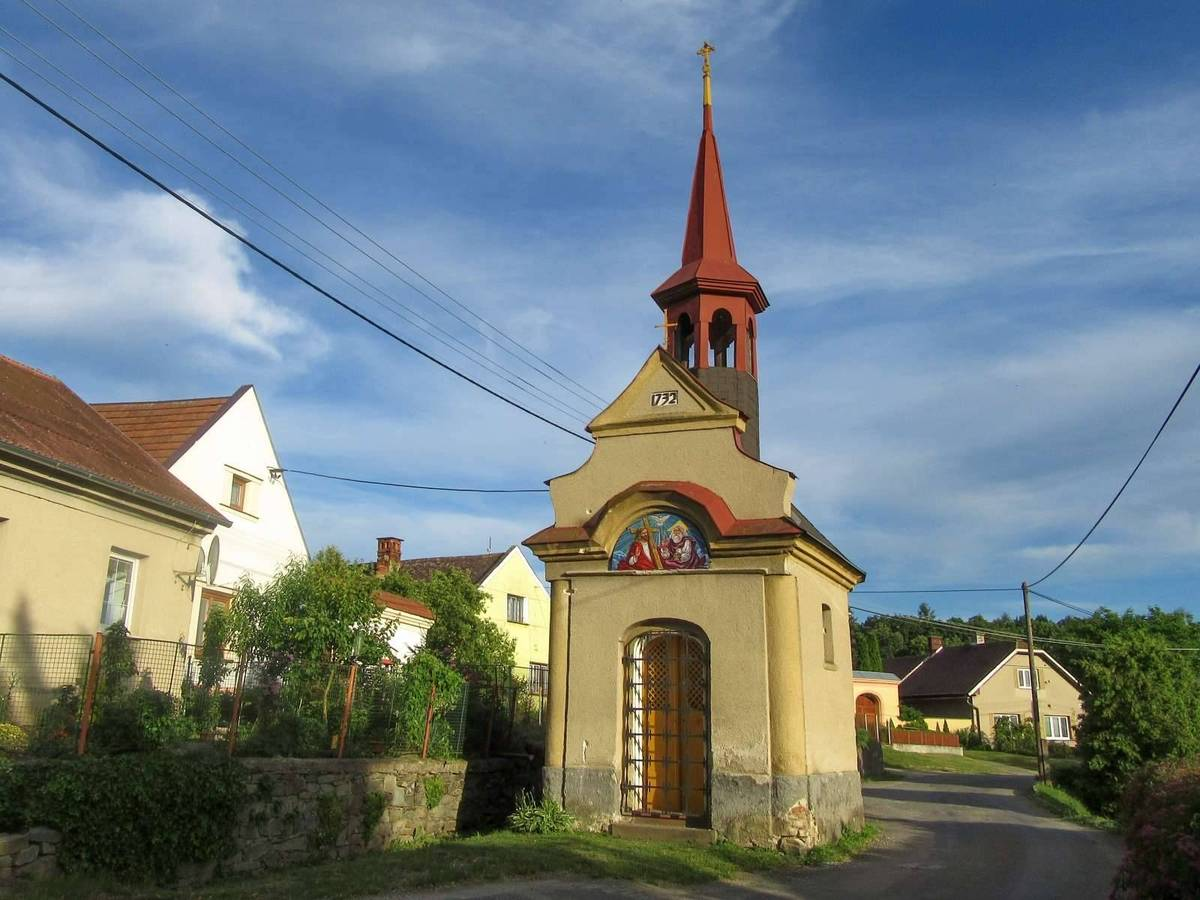
- Chapel of Saint Florian

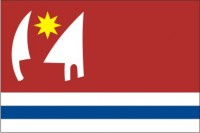
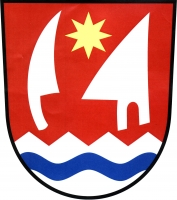
- Flag Coat of arms

- Location in the Czech Republic
- Coordinates: 49°47′13″N 16°58′25″E
- Country: Czech Republic
- Region: Olomouc
- District: Šumperk
- First mentioned: 1273

Area
  - Total: 6.49 km^{2} (2.51 sq mi)
- Elevation: 255 m (837 ft)

Population (2026-01-01)
  - Total: 139
  - Density: 21.4/km^{2} (55.5/sq mi)
- Time zone: UTC+1 (CET)
  - Summer (DST): UTC+2 (CEST)
- Postal codes: 789 73
- Website: www.stavenice.cz

Stavenice (German: Steinmetz) is a municipality and village in Šumperk District in the Olomouc Region of the Czech Republic. It has about 100 inhabitants.

Stavenice lies approximately 20 kilometres (12 mi) south of Šumperk, 30 km (19 mi) north-west of Olomouc, and 186 km (116 mi) east of Prague.

== History ==
The first written mention of Stavenice is from 1273.

== Demographics ==
Historical population
Year	Pop.	±%
1869	231	—
1880	240	+3.9%
1890	260	+8.3%
1900	285	+9.6%
1910	246	−13.7%
1921	248	+0.8%
1930	254	+2.4%
1950	192	−24.4%
1961	200	+4.2%
1970	181	−9.5%
1980	140	−22.7%
1991	132	−5.7%
2001	156	+18.2%
2011	145	−7.1%
2021	127	−12.4%
Source: Censuses
