= Lukavice (Šumperk District) =

- Municipality
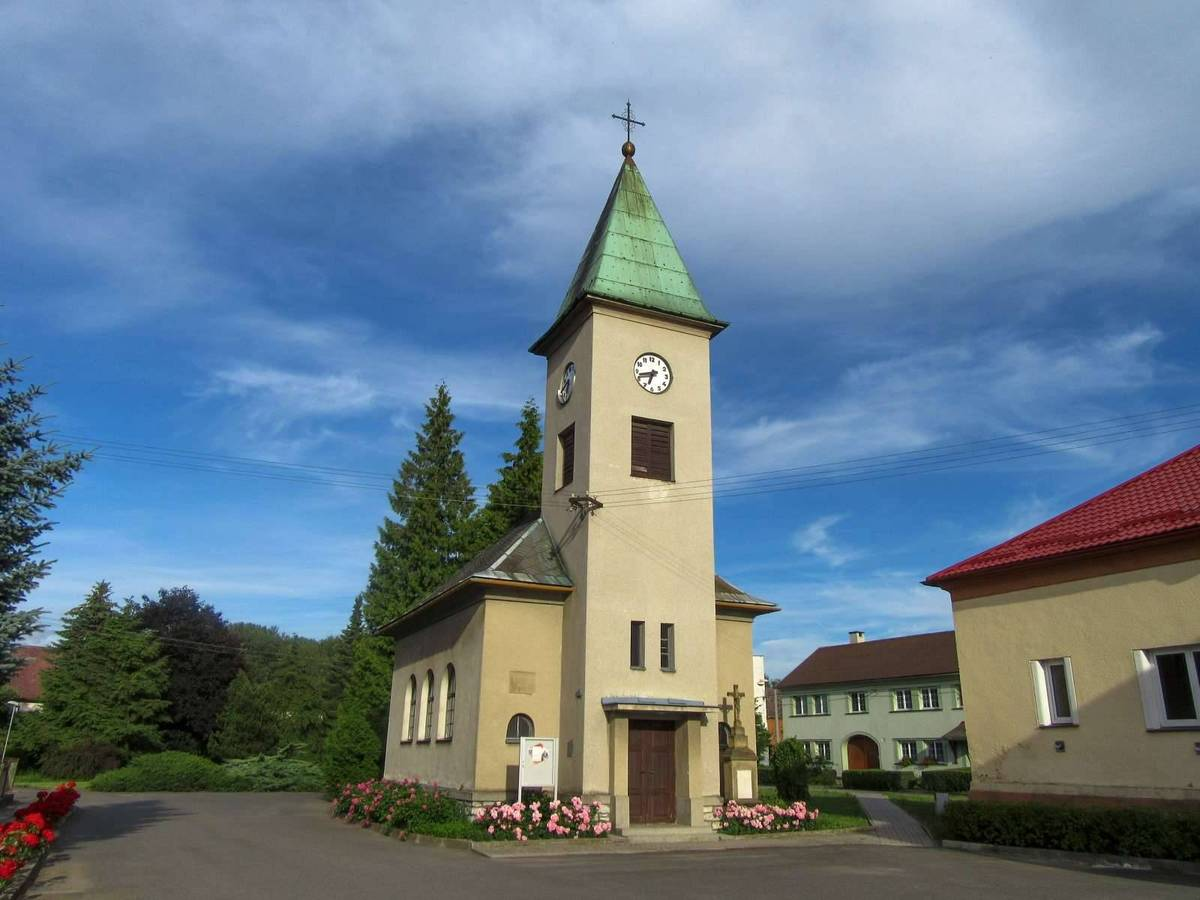
- Chapel of Saint Barbara

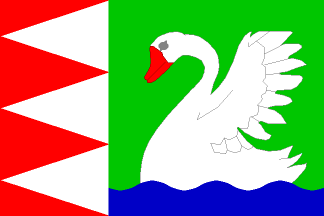
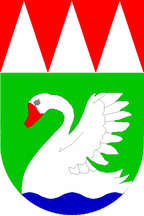
- Flag Coat of arms

- Location in the Czech Republic
- Coordinates: 49°49′23″N 16°55′14″E
- Country: Czech Republic
- Region: Olomouc
- District: Šumperk
- First mentioned: 1273

Area
  - Total: 11.21 km^{2} (4.33 sq mi)
- Elevation: 262 m (860 ft)

Population (2026-01-01)
  - Total: 869
  - Density: 77.5/km^{2} (201/sq mi)
- Time zone: UTC+1 (CET)
  - Summer (DST): UTC+2 (CEST)
- Postal codes: 789 01
- Website: www.lukavicenamorave.cz

Lukavice is a municipality and village in Šumperk District in the Olomouc Region of the Czech Republic. It has about 900 inhabitants.

Lukavice lies approximately 17 kilometres (11 mi) south of Šumperk, 35 km (22 mi) north-west of Olomouc, and 182 km (113 mi) east of Prague.

== Administrative division ==
Lukavice consists of three municipal parts (in brackets population according to the 2021 census):

- Lukavice (533)
- Slavoňov (202)
- Vlachov (75)

== Demographics ==
Historical population
Year	Pop.	±%
1869	846	—
1880	885	+4.6%
1890	922	+4.2%
1900	874	−5.2%
1910	790	−9.6%
1921	819	+3.7%
1930	885	+8.1%
1950	711	−19.7%
1961	727	+2.3%
1970	680	−6.5%
1980	842	+23.8%
1991	976	+15.9%
2001	936	−4.1%
2011	834	−10.9%
2021	810	−2.9%
Source: Censuses
