= Písařov =

- Municipality
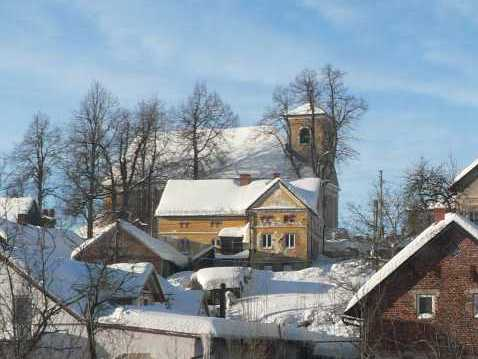
- Church of The Mission of the Holy Apostles

- Flag Coat of arms

- Location in the Czech Republic
- Coordinates: 50°0′18″N 16°48′6″E
- Country: Czech Republic
- Region: Olomouc
- District: Šumperk
- First mentioned: 1278

Area
  - Total: 18.92 km^{2} (7.31 sq mi)
- Elevation: 552 m (1,811 ft)

Population (2026-01-01)
  - Total: 728
  - Density: 38.5/km^{2} (99.7/sq mi)
- Time zone: UTC+1 (CET)
  - Summer (DST): UTC+2 (CEST)
- Postal codes: 789 91
- Website: www.pisarov.cz

Písařov (German: Schreibendorf) is a municipality and village in Šumperk District in the Olomouc Region of the Czech Republic. It has about 700 inhabitants.

Písařov lies approximately 13 kilometres (8 mi) north-west of Šumperk, 57 km (35 mi) north-west of Olomouc, and 171 km (106 mi) east of Prague.

== Administrative division ==
Písařov consists of two municipal parts (in brackets population according to the 2021 census):

- Písařov (574)
- Bukovice (103)

== Demographics ==
Historical population
| Year | Pop. | ±% |
|---|---|---|
| 1869 | 2,148 | — |
| 1880 | 2,196 | +2.2% |
| 1890 | 2,238 | +1.9% |
| 1900 | 2,027 | −9.4% |
| 1910 | 1,830 | −9.7% |
| 1921 | 1,620 | −11.5% |
| 1930 | 1,516 | −6.4% |
| 1950 | 936 | −38.3% |
| 1961 | 896 | −4.3% |
| 1970 | 817 | −8.8% |
| 1980 | 771 | −5.6% |
| 1991 | 716 | −7.1% |
| 2001 | 705 | −1.5% |
| 2011 | 675 | −4.3% |
| 2021 | 677 | +0.3% |
Source: Censuses
