= Leština (Šumperk District) =

- Municipality
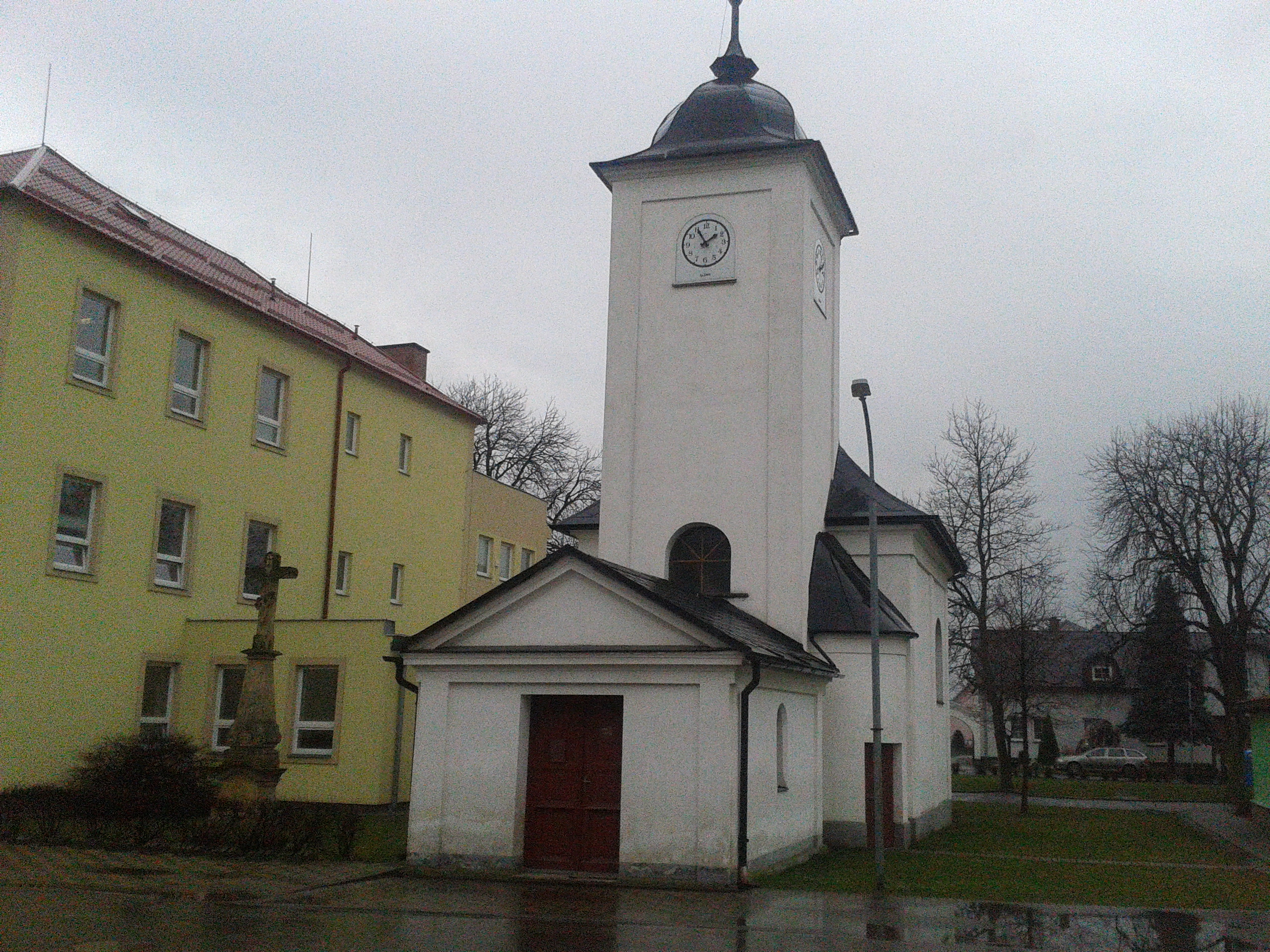
- Chapel of Saint Wenceslaus

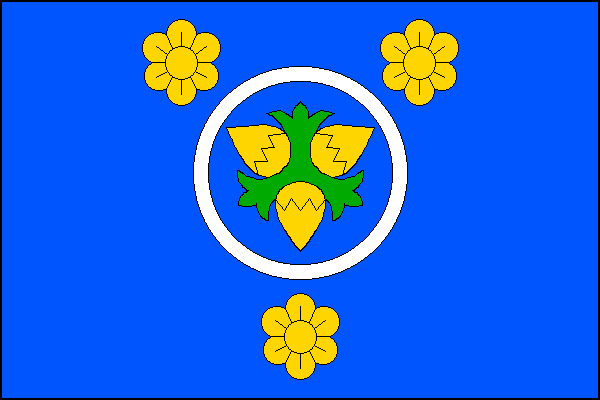
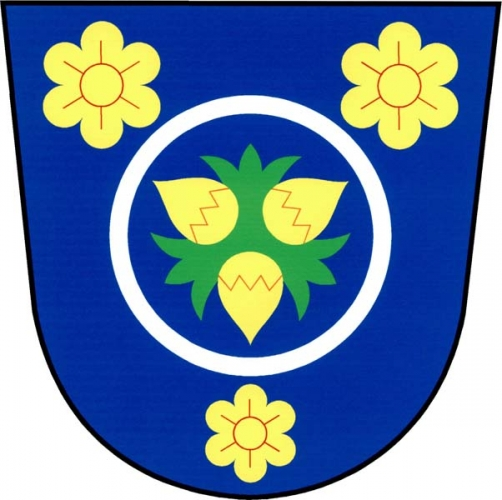
- Flag Coat of arms

- Location in the Czech Republic
- Coordinates: 49°52′8″N 16°55′39″E
- Country: Czech Republic
- Region: Olomouc
- District: Šumperk
- First mentioned: 1392

Area
  - Total: 5.24 km^{2} (2.02 sq mi)
- Elevation: 270 m (890 ft)

Population (2026-01-01)
  - Total: 1,228
  - Density: 234/km^{2} (607/sq mi)
- Time zone: UTC+1 (CET)
  - Summer (DST): UTC+2 (CEST)
- Postal code: 789 71
- Website: www.ou-lestina.cz

Leština (German: Lesche) is a municipality and village in Šumperk District in the Olomouc Region of the Czech Republic. It has about 1,200 inhabitants.

Leština lies approximately 12 kilometres (7 mi) south of Šumperk, 39 km (24 mi) north-west of Olomouc, and 182 km (113 mi) east of Prague.

== Demographics ==
Historical population
Year	Pop.	±%
1869	659	—
1880	745	+13.1%
1890	827	+11.0%
1900	974	+17.8%
1910	1,063	+9.1%
1921	960	−9.7%
1930	1,030	+7.3%
1950	963	−6.5%
1961	1,029	+6.9%
1970	1,076	+4.6%
1980	1,183	+9.9%
1991	1,184	+0.1%
2001	1,254	+5.9%
2011	1,260	+0.5%
2021	1,221	−3.1%
Source: Censuses
