= Rájec =

- Municipality
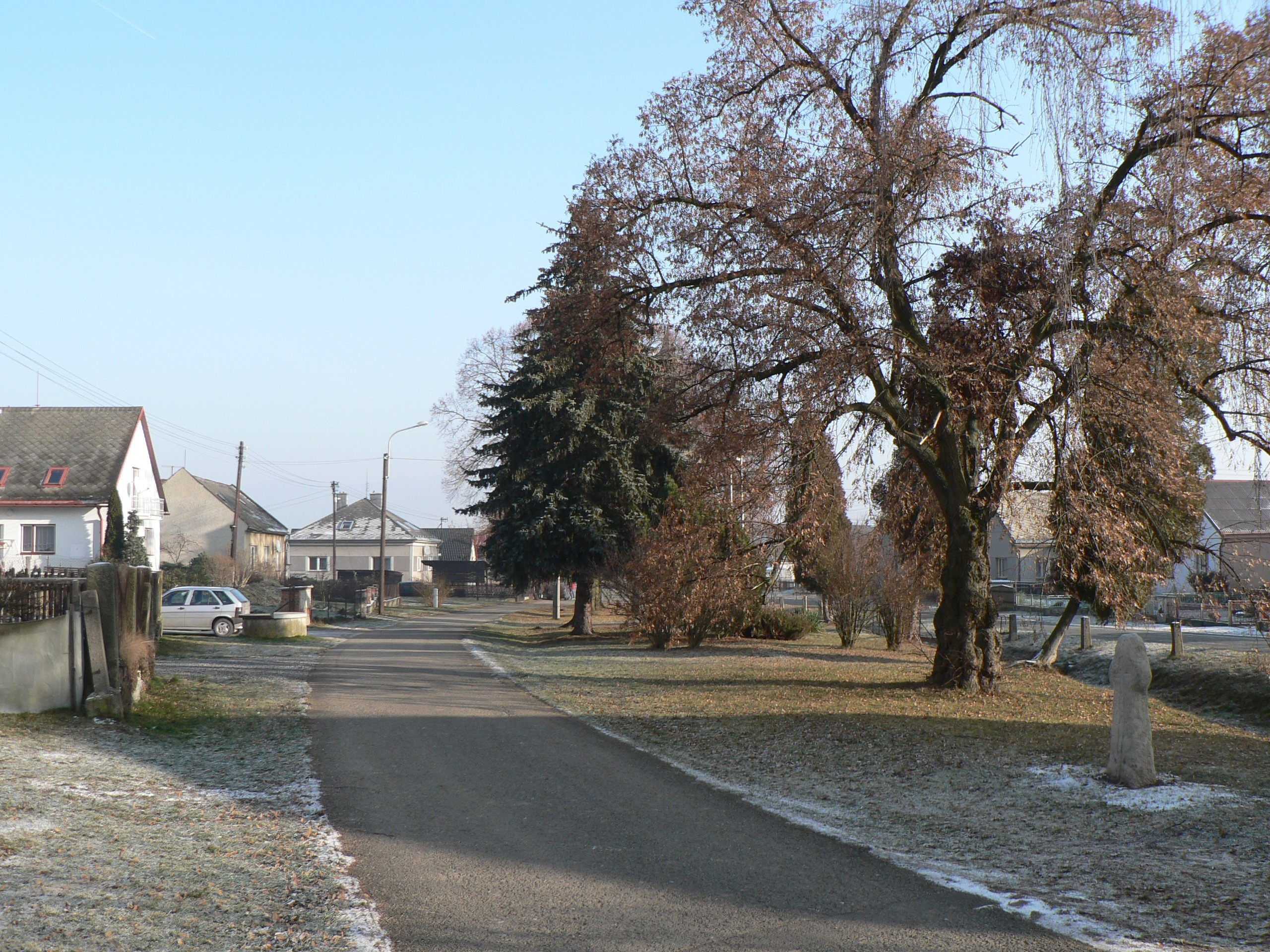
- Centre of Rájec

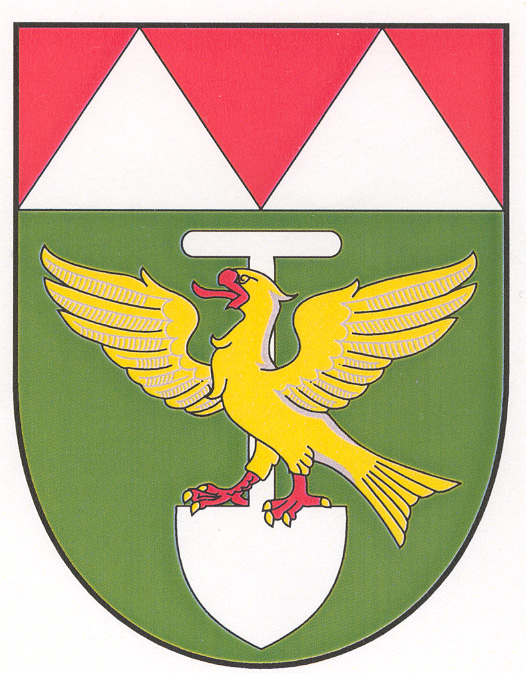
- Flag Coat of arms

- Location in the Czech Republic
- Coordinates: 49°51′23″N 16°54′11″E
- Country: Czech Republic
- Region: Olomouc
- District: Šumperk
- First mentioned: 1273

Area
  - Total: 4.91 km^{2} (1.90 sq mi)
- Elevation: 274 m (899 ft)

Population (2026-01-01)
  - Total: 559
  - Density: 114/km^{2} (295/sq mi)
- Time zone: UTC+1 (CET)
  - Summer (DST): UTC+2 (CEST)
- Postal codes: 789 01
- Website: rajec.zabrezsko.cz

Rájec (German: Gross Rasel) is a municipality and village in Šumperk District in the Olomouc Region of the Czech Republic. It has about 600 inhabitants.

Rájec lies approximately 14 kilometres (9 mi) south-west of Šumperk, 39 km (24 mi) north-west of Olomouc, and 180 km (110 mi) east of Prague.

== Demographics ==
Historical population
Year	Pop.	±%
1869	642	—
1880	609	−5.1%
1890	630	+3.4%
1900	596	−5.4%
1910	641	+7.6%
1921	651	+1.6%
1930	613	−5.8%
1950	505	−17.6%
1961	506	+0.2%
1970	491	−3.0%
1980	503	+2.4%
1991	451	−10.3%
2001	470	+4.2%
2011	481	+2.3%
2021	489	+1.7%
Source: Censuses
