= Bratrušov =

- Municipality
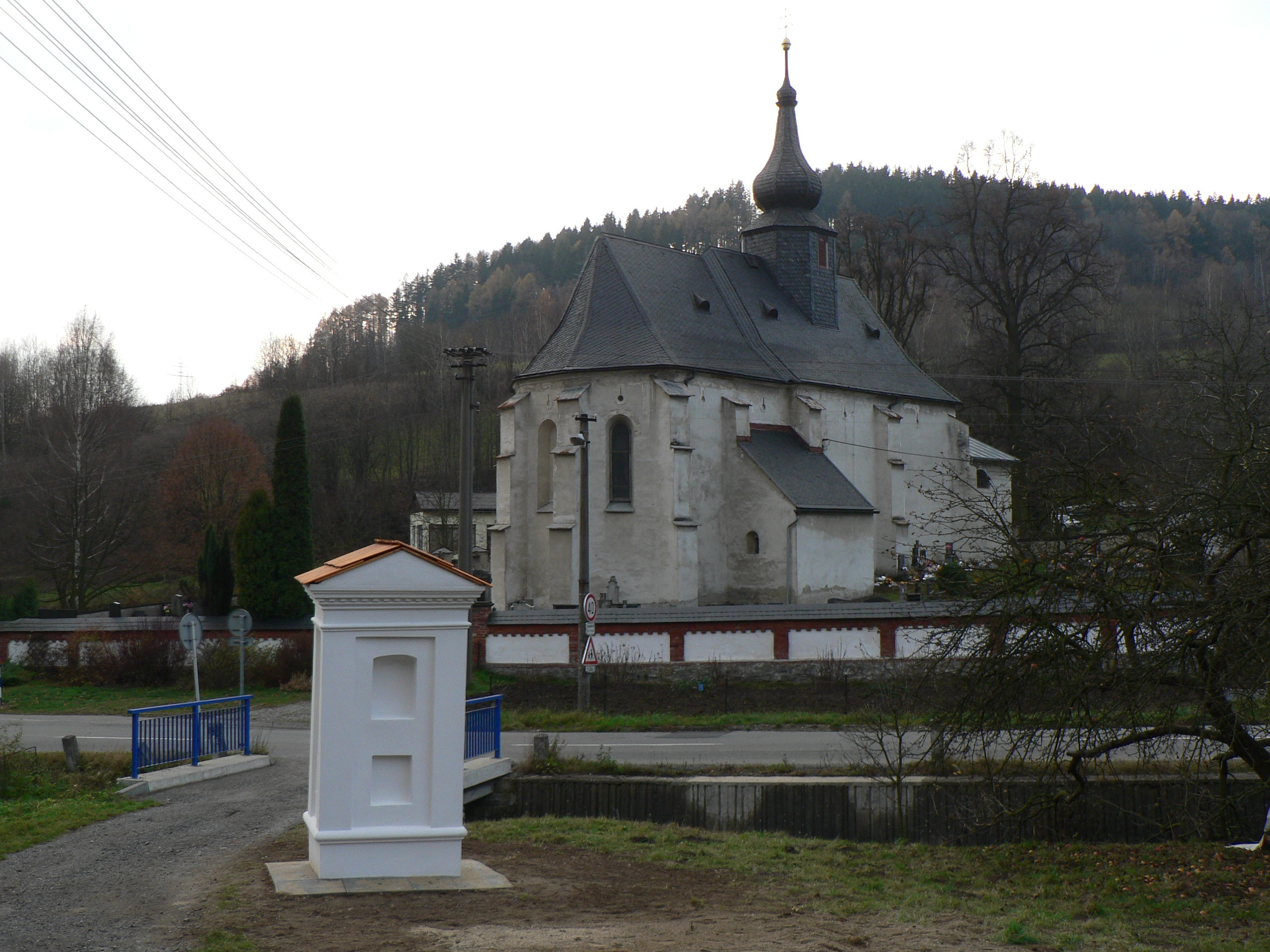
- Church of All Saints

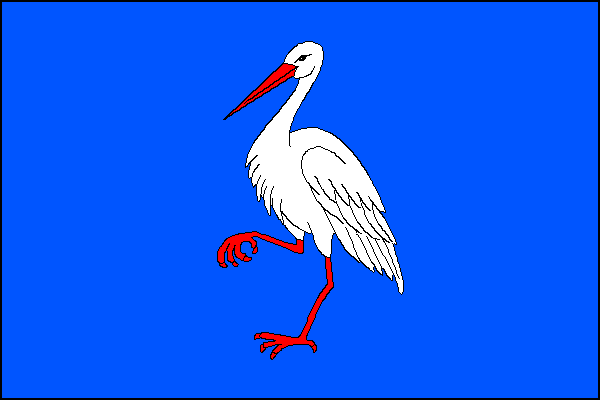
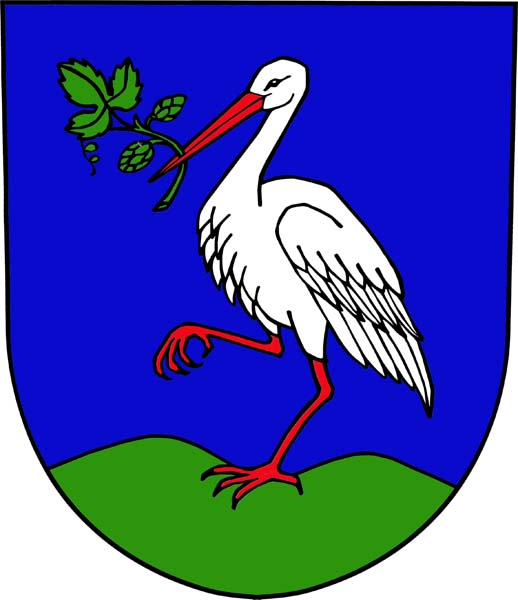
- Flag Coat of arms

- Location in the Czech Republic
- Coordinates: 50°0′34″N 16°56′59″E
- Country: Czech Republic
- Region: Olomouc
- District: Šumperk
- First mentioned: 1371

Area
  - Total: 11.54 km^{2} (4.46 sq mi)
- Elevation: 398 m (1,306 ft)

Population (2026-01-01)
  - Total: 642
  - Density: 55.6/km^{2} (144/sq mi)
- Time zone: UTC+1 (CET)
  - Summer (DST): UTC+2 (CEST)
- Postal codes: 787 01
- Website: www.bratrusov.cz

Bratrušov (German: Brattersdorf) is a municipality and village in Šumperk District in the Olomouc Region of the Czech Republic. It has about 600 inhabitants.

Bratrušov lies approximately 6 kilometres (4 mi) north of Šumperk, 52 km (32 mi) north-west of Olomouc, and 182 km (113 mi) east of Prague.

== Administrative division ==
Bratrušov consists of two municipal parts (in brackets population according to the 2021 census):

- Bratrušov (604)
- Osikov (25)

== Demographics ==
Historical population
Year	Pop.	±%
1869	1,140	—
1880	1,149	+0.8%
1890	1,207	+5.0%
1900	1,200	−0.6%
1910	1,118	−6.8%
1921	1,012	−9.5%
1930	1,090	+7.7%
1950	641	−41.2%
1961	663	+3.4%
1970	653	−1.5%
1980	579	−11.3%
1991	546	−5.7%
2001	577	+5.7%
2011	611	+5.9%
2021	629	+2.9%
Source: Censuses
