= Rohle =

- Municipality
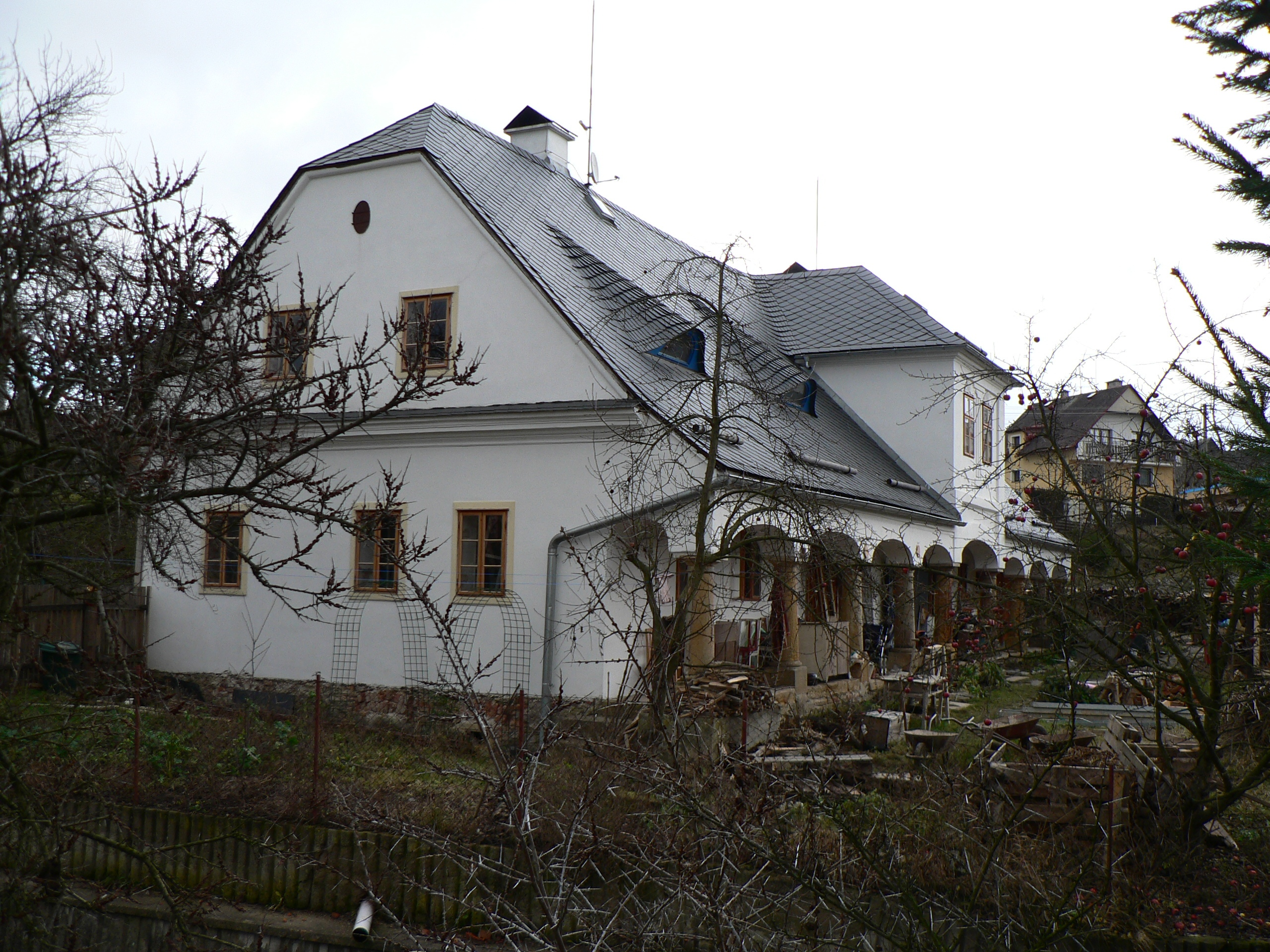
- Homestead in Rohle, a cultural monument

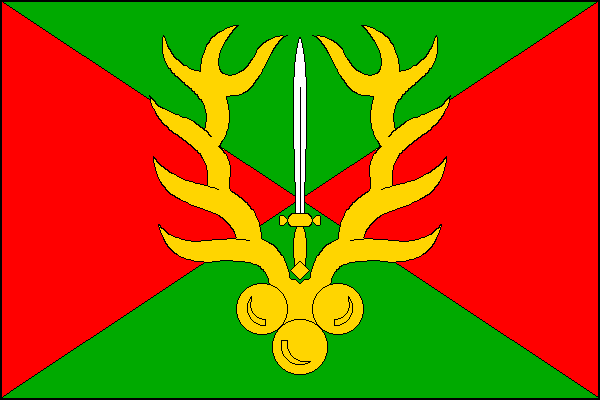
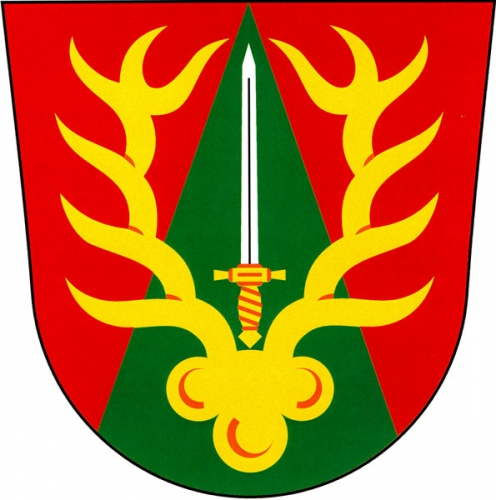
- Flag Coat of arms

- Location in the Czech Republic
- Coordinates: 49°51′36″N 17°0′55″E
- Country: Czech Republic
- Region: Olomouc
- District: Šumperk
- First mentioned: 1344

Area
  - Total: 18.56 km^{2} (7.17 sq mi)
- Elevation: 323 m (1,060 ft)

Population (2026-01-01)
  - Total: 615
  - Density: 33.1/km^{2} (85.8/sq mi)
- Time zone: UTC+1 (CET)
  - Summer (DST): UTC+2 (CEST)
- Postal codes: 789 74
- Website: www.obecrohle.cz

Rohle is a municipality and village in Šumperk District in the Olomouc Region of the Czech Republic. It has about 600 inhabitants.

Rohle lies approximately 12 kilometres (7 mi) south of Šumperk, 35 km (22 mi) north-west of Olomouc, and 187 km (116 mi) east of Prague.

== Administrative division ==
Rohle consists of three municipal parts (in brackets population according to the 2021 census):

- Rohle (389)
- Janoslavice (129)
- Nedvězí (66)

== History ==
The first written mention of Rohle is from 1344. In 1976, the municipalities of Janoslavice and Nedvězí were merged with Rohle.

== Demographics ==
Historical population
Year	Pop.	±%
1869	2,194	—
1880	2,262	+3.1%
1890	2,239	−1.0%
1900	2,114	−5.6%
1910	1,957	−7.4%
1921	1,732	−11.5%
1930	1,704	−1.6%
1950	1,068	−37.3%
1961	1,092	+2.2%
1970	913	−16.4%
1980	776	−15.0%
1991	676	−12.9%
2001	665	−1.6%
2011	620	−6.8%
2021	584	−5.8%
Source: Censuses
