= Šléglov =

- Municipality
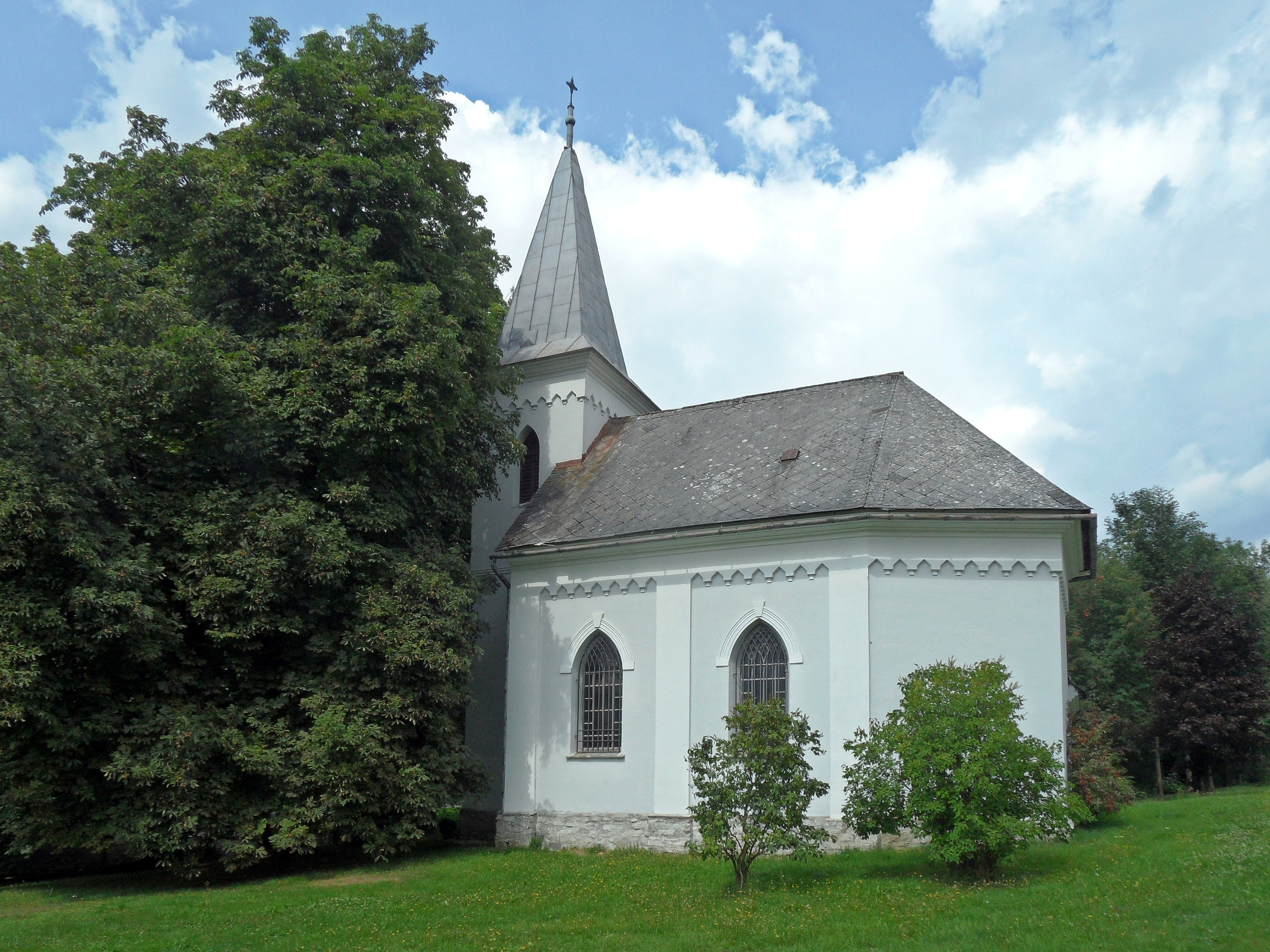
- Chapel of the Divine Heart of the Lord

- Location in the Czech Republic
- Coordinates: 50°9′11″N 16°58′57″E
- Country: Czech Republic
- Region: Olomouc
- District: Šumperk
- First mentioned: 1325

Area
  - Total: 7.17 km^{2} (2.77 sq mi)
- Elevation: 661 m (2,169 ft)

Population (2026-01-01)
  - Total: 40
  - Density: 5.6/km^{2} (14/sq mi)
- Time zone: UTC+1 (CET)
  - Summer (DST): UTC+2 (CEST)
- Postal codes: 788 25
- Website: www.sleglov.cz

Šléglov (German: Schlögelsdorf) is a municipality and village in Šumperk District in the Olomouc Region of the Czech Republic. It has about 40 inhabitants.

Šléglov lies approximately 22 kilometres (14 mi) north of Šumperk, 66 km (41 mi) north of Olomouc, and 184 km (114 mi) east of Prague.

== Demographics ==
Historical population
| Year | Pop. | ±% |
|---|---|---|
| 1869 | 293 | — |
| 1880 | 295 | +0.7% |
| 1890 | 312 | +5.8% |
| 1900 | 296 | −5.1% |
| 1910 | 304 | +2.7% |
| 1921 | 312 | +2.6% |
| 1930 | 331 | +6.1% |
| 1950 | 81 | −75.5% |
| 1961 | 98 | +21.0% |
| 1970 | 60 | −38.8% |
| 1980 | 35 | −41.7% |
| 1991 | 26 | −25.7% |
| 2001 | 27 | +3.8% |
| 2011 | 29 | +7.4% |
| 2021 | 26 | −10.3% |
Source: Censuses
