= Dubicko =

- Municipality
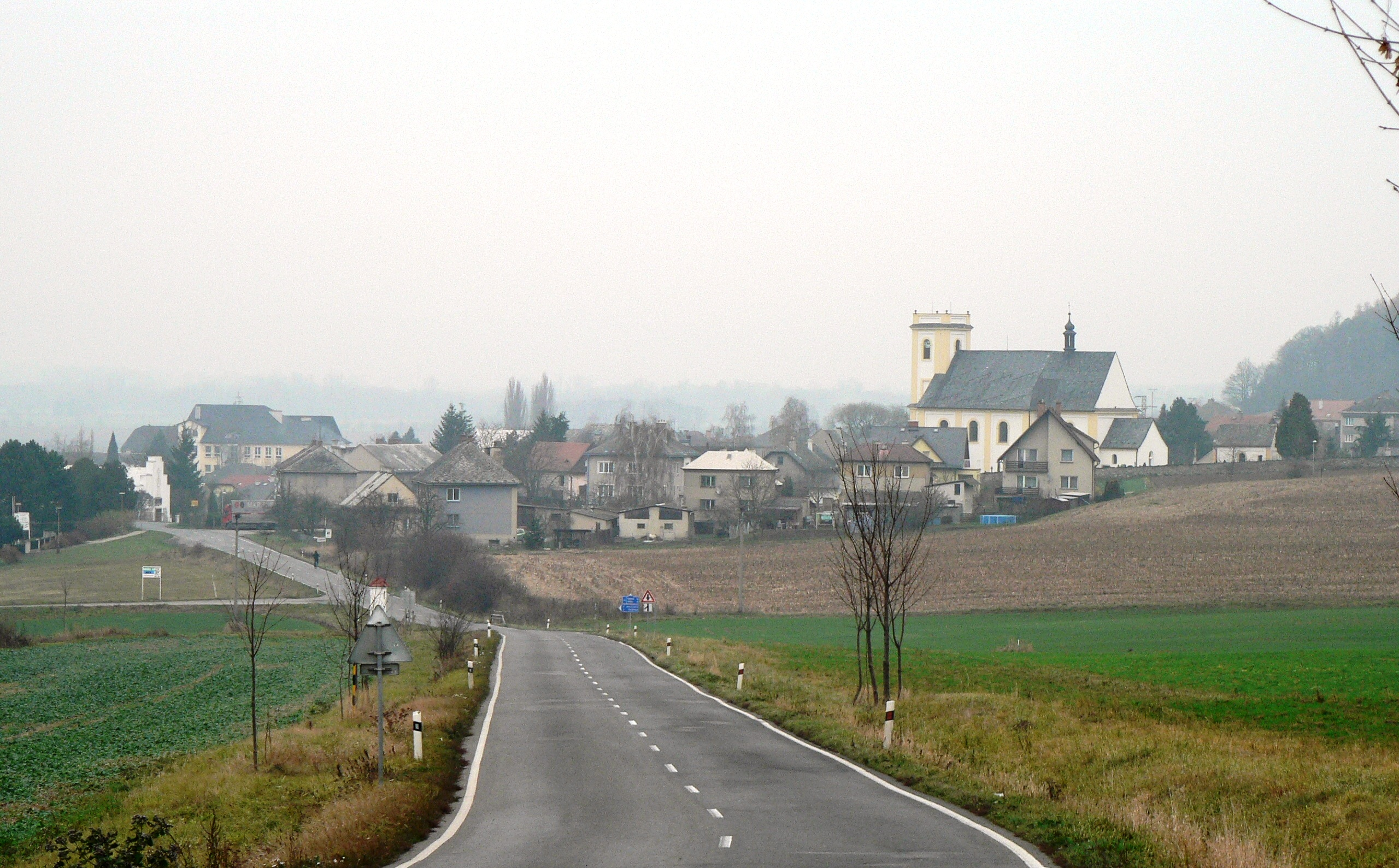
- View from the east

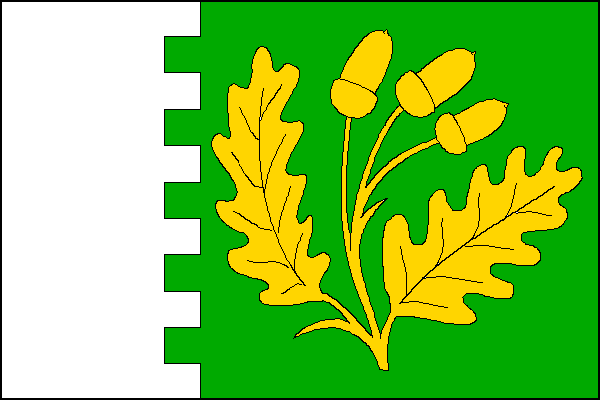
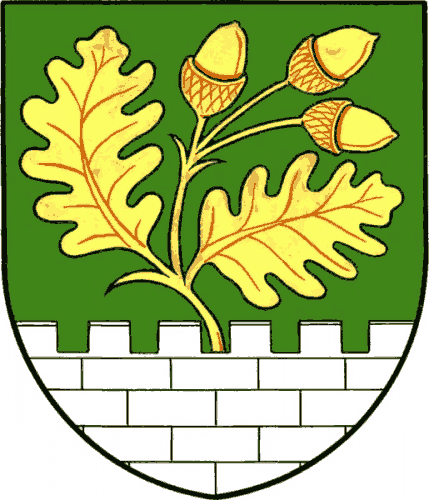
- Flag Coat of arms

- Location in the Czech Republic
- Coordinates: 49°49′41″N 16°57′46″E
- Country: Czech Republic
- Region: Olomouc
- District: Šumperk
- First mentioned: 1238

Area
  - Total: 7.84 km^{2} (3.03 sq mi)
- Elevation: 267 m (876 ft)

Population (2026-01-01)
  - Total: 1,131
  - Density: 144/km^{2} (374/sq mi)
- Time zone: UTC+1 (CET)
  - Summer (DST): UTC+2 (CEST)
- Postal code: 789 72
- Website: www.dubicko.cz

Dubicko (German: Dubitzko) is a municipality and village in Šumperk District in the Olomouc Region of the Czech Republic. It has about 1,100 inhabitants.

Dubicko lies approximately 16 kilometres (10 mi) south of Šumperk, 34 km (21 mi) north-west of Olomouc, and 184 km (114 mi) east of Prague.

== Demographics ==
Historical population
Year	Pop.	±%
1869	721	—
1880	774	+7.4%
1890	790	+2.1%
1900	820	+3.8%
1910	890	+8.5%
1921	932	+4.7%
1930	983	+5.5%
1950	794	−19.2%
1961	825	+3.9%
1970	836	+1.3%
1980	1,010	+20.8%
1991	1,004	−0.6%
2001	1,066	+6.2%
2011	1,022	−4.1%
2021	1,076	+5.3%
Source: Censuses
