= Klopina =

- Municipality
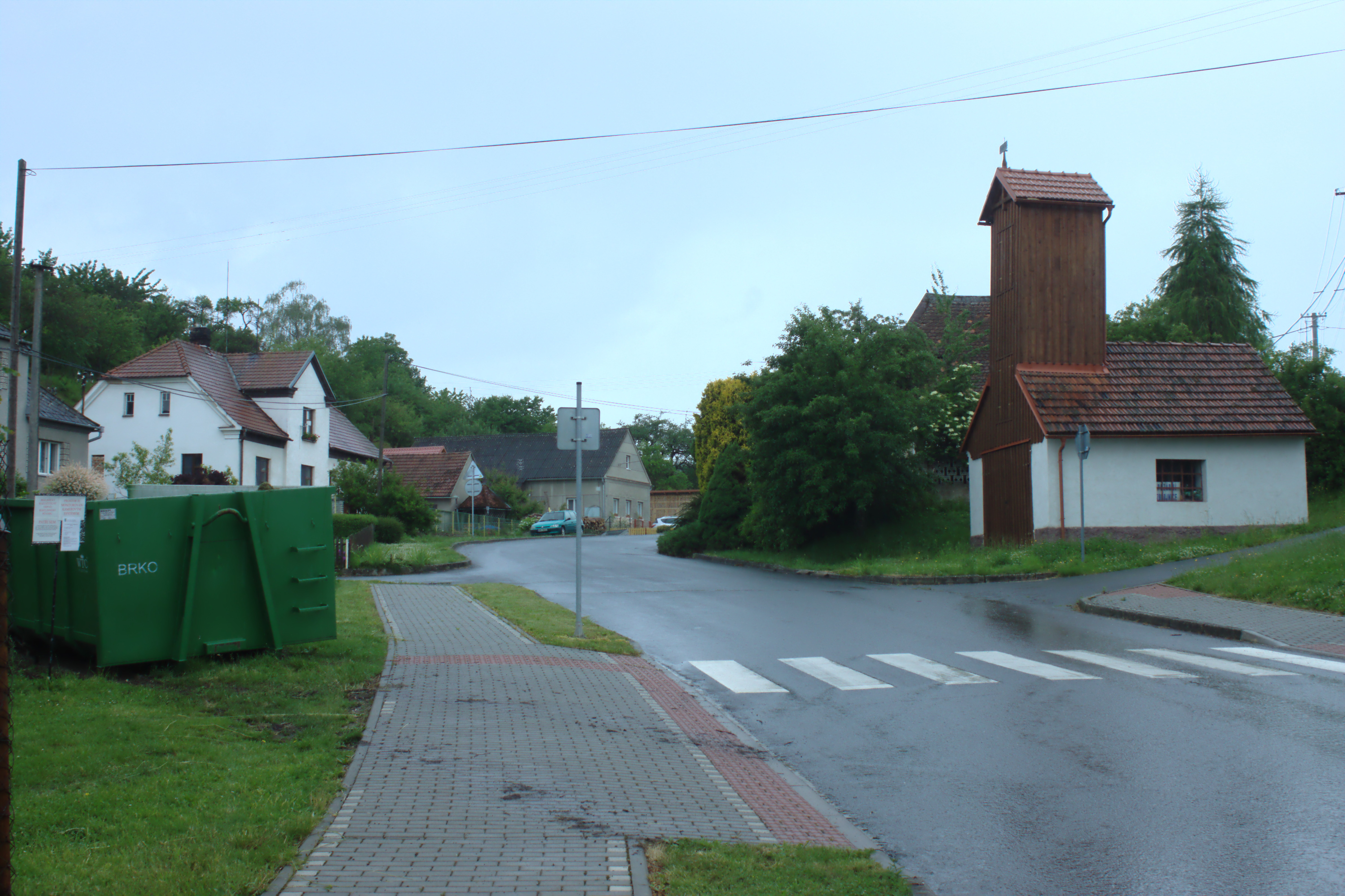
- Veleboř, a part of Klopina

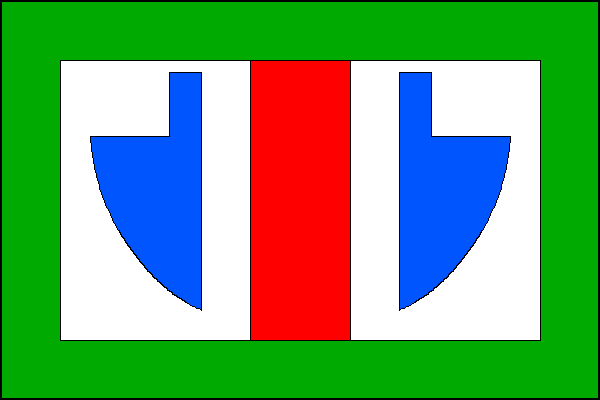
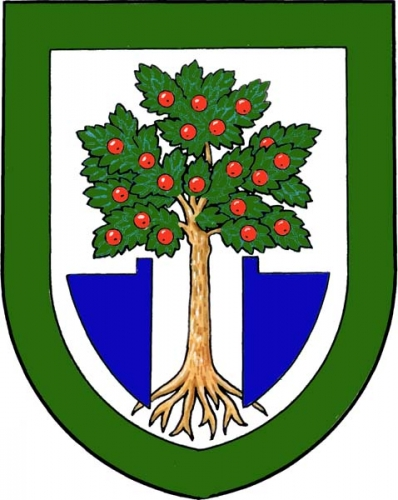
- Flag Coat of arms

- Location in the Czech Republic
- Coordinates: 49°49′7″N 17°1′10″E
- Country: Czech Republic
- Region: Olomouc
- District: Šumperk
- First mentioned: 1366

Area
  - Total: 12.94 km^{2} (5.00 sq mi)
- Elevation: 306 m (1,004 ft)

Population (2026-01-01)
  - Total: 626
  - Density: 48.4/km^{2} (125/sq mi)
- Time zone: UTC+1 (CET)
  - Summer (DST): UTC+2 (CEST)
- Postal codes: 789 73
- Website: www.klopina.cz

Klopina (German: Kloppe) is a municipality and village in Šumperk District in the Olomouc Region of the Czech Republic. It has about 600 inhabitants.

Klopina lies approximately 17 kilometres (11 mi) south of Šumperk, 30 km (19 mi) north-west of Olomouc, and 189 km (117 mi) east of Prague.

== Administrative division ==
Klopina consists of two municipal parts (in brackets population according to the 2021 census):

- Klopina (459)
- Veleboř (123)

== History ==
The first written mention of Klopina is from 1366.

== Demographics ==
Historical population
| Year | Pop. | ±% |
|---|---|---|
| 1869 | 762 | — |
| 1880 | 806 | +5.8% |
| 1890 | 771 | −4.3% |
| 1900 | 732 | −5.1% |
| 1910 | 727 | −0.7% |
| 1921 | 759 | +4.4% |
| 1930 | 757 | −0.3% |
| 1950 | 595 | −21.4% |
| 1961 | 568 | −4.5% |
| 1970 | 590 | +3.9% |
| 1980 | 591 | +0.2% |
| 1991 | 584 | −1.2% |
| 2001 | 602 | +3.1% |
| 2011 | 619 | +2.8% |
| 2021 | 582 | −6.0% |
Source: Censuses
