= Bušín =

- Municipality
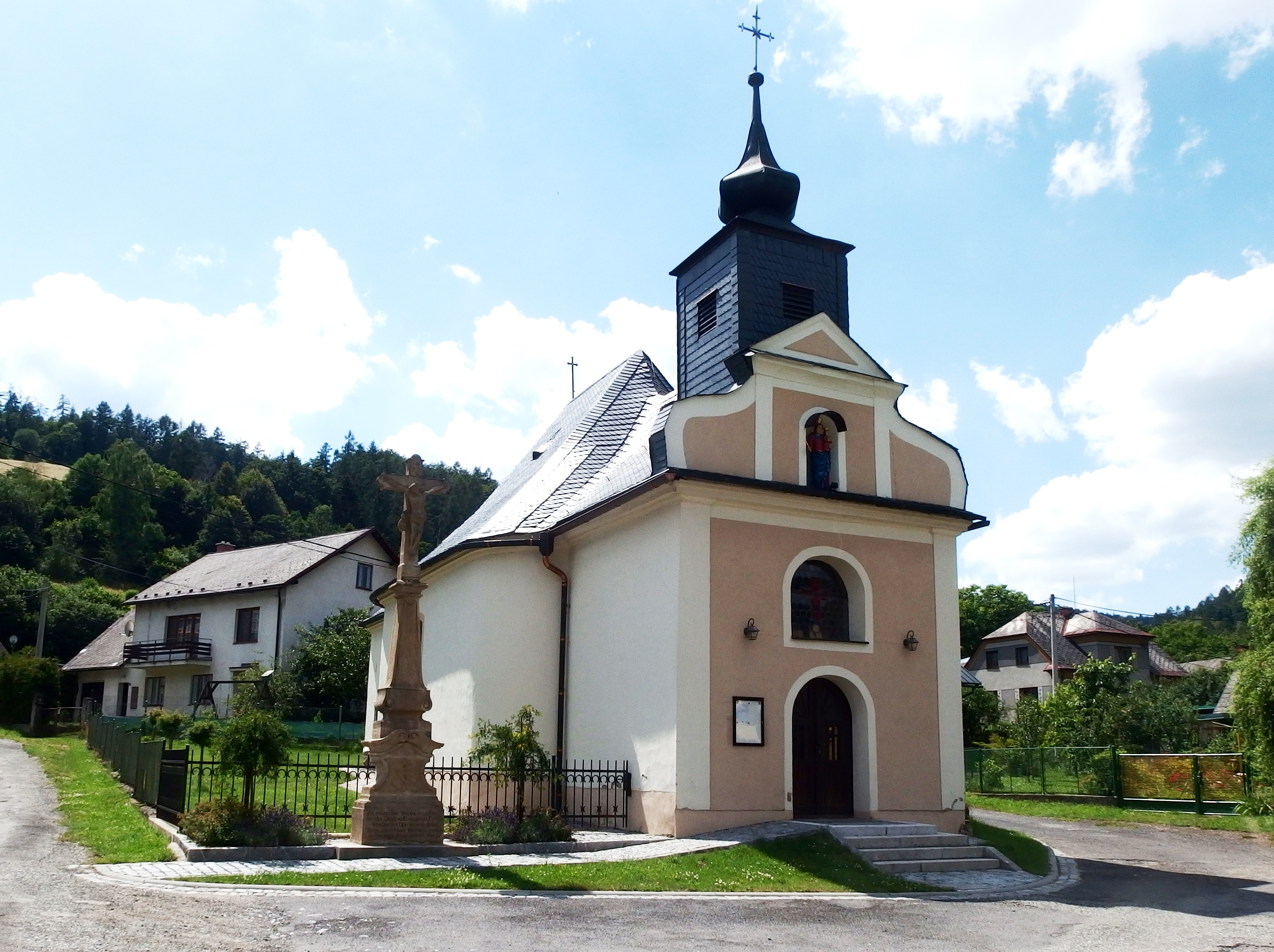
- Chapel of Our Lady of Sorrows

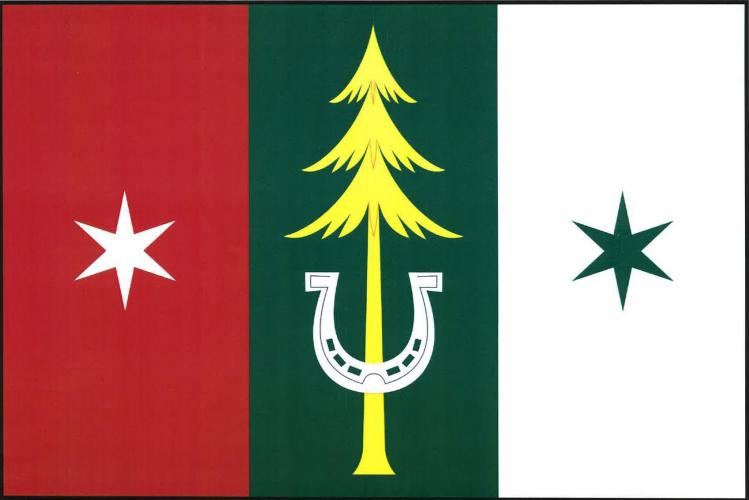
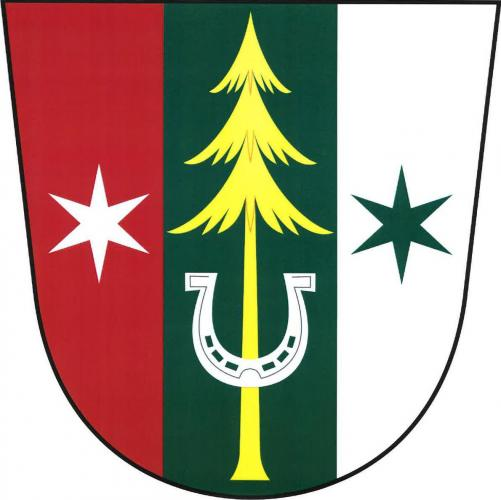
- Flag Coat of arms

- Location in the Czech Republic
- Coordinates: 49°58′34″N 16°50′17″E
- Country: Czech Republic
- Region: Olomouc
- District: Šumperk
- First mentioned: 1490

Area
  - Total: 8.60 km^{2} (3.32 sq mi)
- Elevation: 355 m (1,165 ft)

Population (2026-01-01)
  - Total: 382
  - Density: 44.4/km^{2} (115/sq mi)
- Time zone: UTC+1 (CET)
  - Summer (DST): UTC+2 (CEST)
- Postal codes: 789 62
- Website: www.busin.cz

Bušín is a municipality and village in Šumperk District in the Olomouc Region of the Czech Republic. It has about 400 inhabitants.

Bušín lies approximately 10 kilometres (6 mi) west of Šumperk, 53 km (33 mi) north-west of Olomouc, and 174 km (108 mi) east of Prague.

== Demographics ==
Historical population
Year	Pop.	±%
1869	919	—
1880	899	−2.2%
1890	918	+2.1%
1900	893	−2.7%
1910	907	+1.6%
1921	964	+6.3%
1930	850	−11.8%
1950	576	−32.2%
1961	521	−9.5%
1970	501	−3.8%
1980	470	−6.2%
1991	447	−4.9%
2001	428	−4.3%
2011	407	−4.9%
2021	360	−11.5%
Source: Censuses
