= Šumperk District =

Šumperk District Okres Šumperk
- District
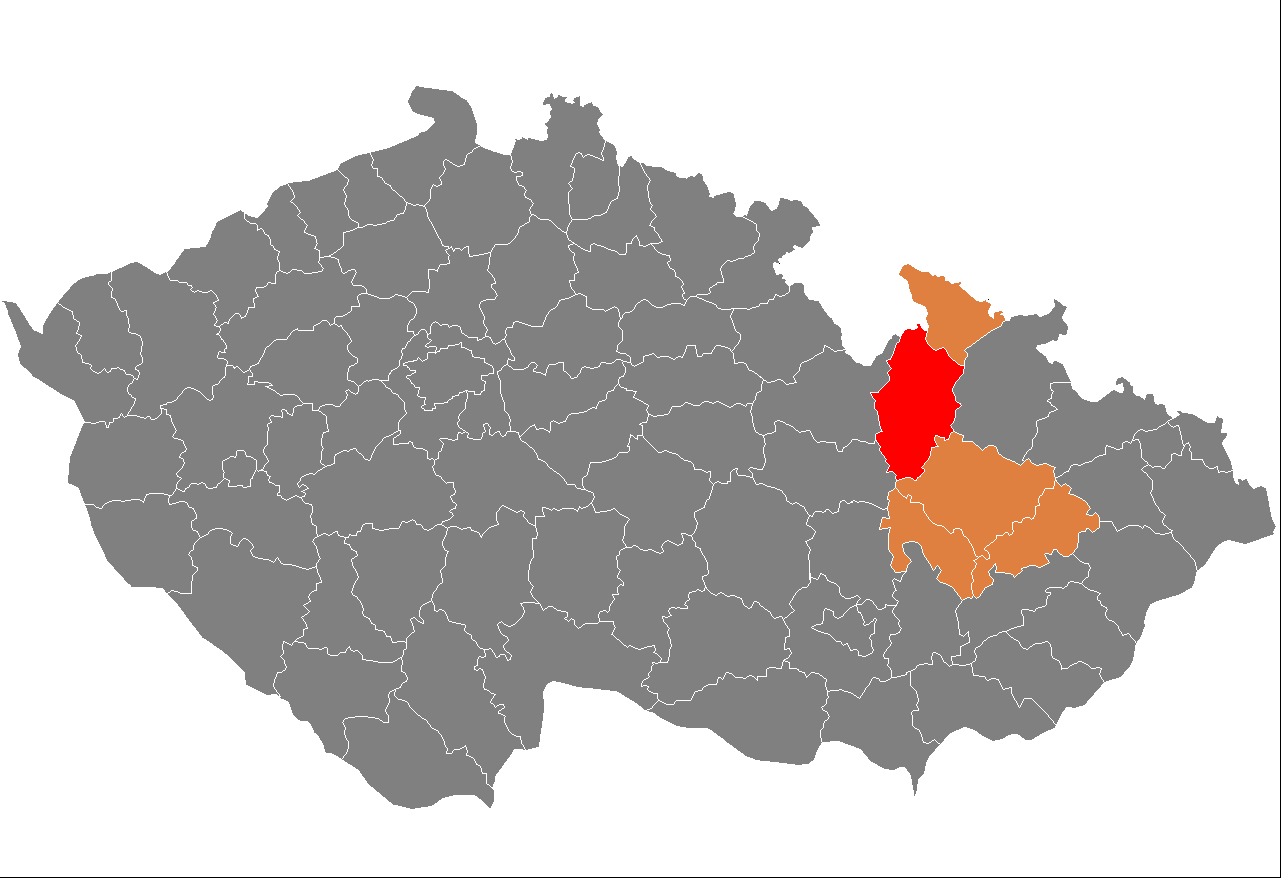
- Location in the Olomouc Region within the Czech Republic
- Coordinates: 49°58′N 16°58′E
- Country: Czech Republic
- Region: Olomouc
- Capital: Šumperk

Area
  - Total: 1,313.06 km^{2} (506.98 sq mi)

Population (2026)
  - Total: 118,778
  - Density: 90.4589/km^{2} (234.288/sq mi)
- Time zone: UTC+1 (CET)
  - Summer (DST): UTC+2 (CEST)
- Municipalities: 78
- * Towns: 8
- * Market towns: 0

Šumperk District (Czech: okres Šumperk) is a district in the Olomouc Region of the Czech Republic. Its capital is the town of Šumperk.

== Administrative division ==
Šumperk District is divided into three administrative districts of municipalities with extended competence: Šumperk, Mohelnice and Zábřeh.

=== List of municipalities ===
Towns are marked in bold:

Bludov - Bohdíkov - Bohuslavice - Bohutín - Branná - Bratrušov - Brníčko - Bušín - Chromeč - Dlouhomilov - Dolní Studénky - Drozdov - Dubicko - Hanušovice - Horní Studénky - Hoštejn - Hraběšice - Hrabišín - Hrabová - Hynčina - Jakubovice - Janoušov - Jedlí - Jestřebí - Jindřichov - Kamenná - Klopina - Kolšov - Kopřivná - Kosov - Krchleby - Lesnice - Leština - Libina - Líšnice - Loštice - Loučná nad Desnou - Lukavice - Malá Morava - Maletín - Mírov - Mohelnice - Moravičany - Nemile - Nový Malín - Olšany - Oskava - Palonín - Pavlov - Petrov nad Desnou - Písařov - Police - Postřelmov - Postřelmůvek - Rájec - Rapotín - Rejchartice - Rohle - Rovensko - Ruda nad Moravou - Šléglov - Sobotín - Staré Město - Stavenice - Štíty - Sudkov - Šumperk - Svébohov - Třeština - Úsov - Velké Losiny - Vernířovice - Vikantice - Vikýřovice - Vyšehoří - Zábřeh - Zborov - Zvole

== Geography ==
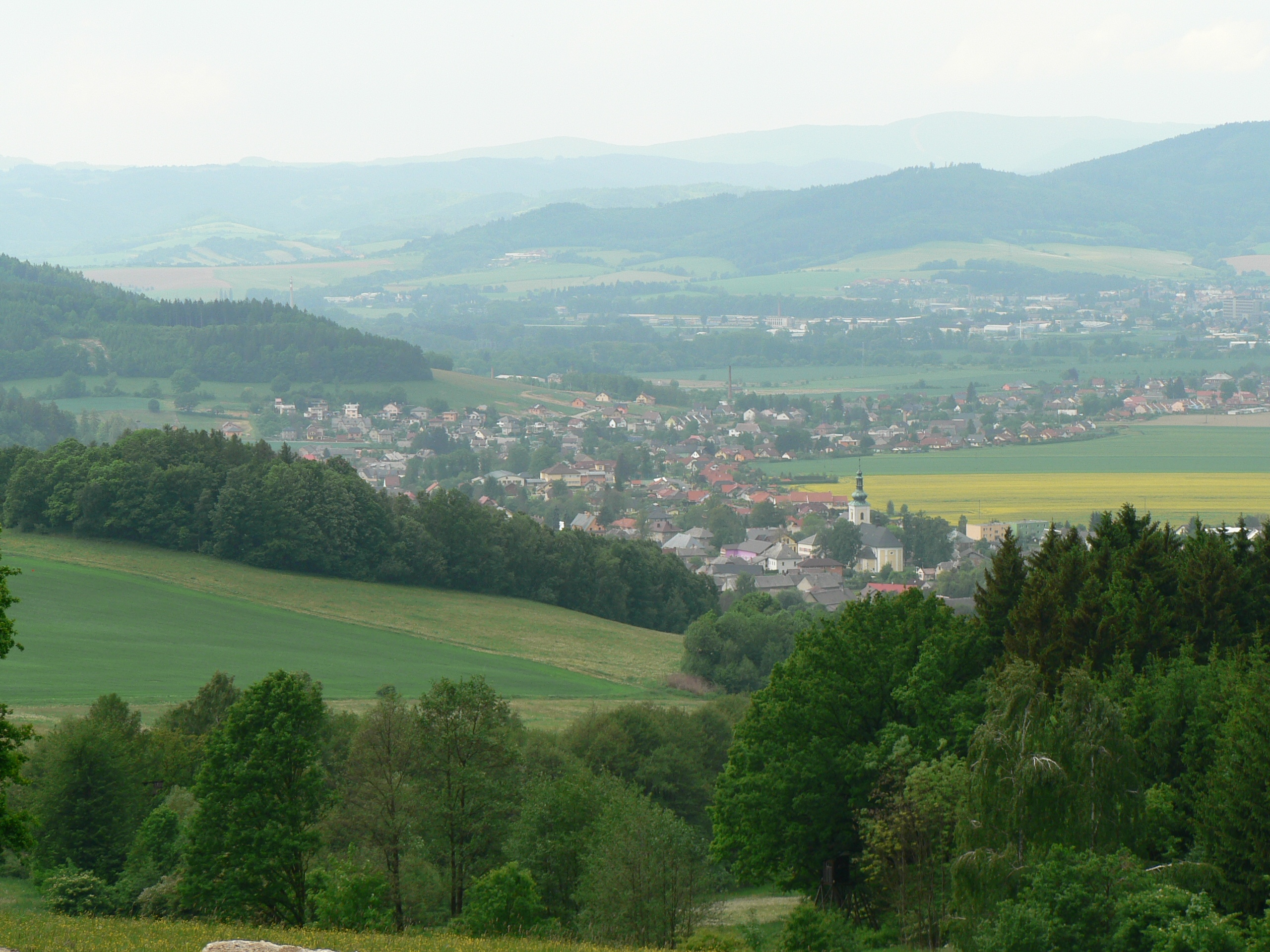
Nový Malín and surrounding landscape

Šumperk District borders Poland in the north. The landscape is mostly hilly and mountainous, and is divided by several river valleys. The territory extends into eight geomorphological mesoregions: Hanušovice Highlands (most of the territory), Hrubý Jeseník (northeast), Golden Mountains (north), Králický Sněžník Mountains (north), Zábřeh Highlands (southwest), Mohelnice Depression (south), Kłodzko Valley (a small part in the west), Upper Morava Valley (a small part in the east), and Nízký Jeseník (a small part in the east). The highest point of the district and of the entire Olomouc Region is the Praděd mountain in Loučná nad Desnou with an elevation of 1,491 m (4,892 ft). The lowest point is the river bed of the Morava in Moravičany at 243 m (797 ft).

From the total district area of 1,313.1 km^{2} (507.0 sq mi), agricultural land occupies 556.5 km^{2} (214.9 sq mi), forests occupy 639.6 km^{2} (247.0 sq mi), and water area occupies 13.6 km^{2} (5.3 sq mi). Forests cover 48.7% of the district's area.

The most important river is the Morava, flowing across the district from north to south. Its largest tributaries within the district are the Desná and Moravská Sázava. The largest body of water is Moravičanské Lake with an area of 90 ha (220 acres), which is an artificial lake created by flooding a gravel quarry. A notable body of water is also the Dlouhé stráně Reservoir.

The Jeseníky Protected Landscape Area extends into the district in the east, and the Litovelské Pomoraví Protected Landscape Area extends into the district in the south.

== Demographics ==
Historical population

Year	Pop.	±%
1869	131,968	—
1880	137,243	+4.0%
1890	140,433	+2.3%
1900	140,288	−0.1%
1910	143,110	+2.0%

Year	Pop.	±%
1921	136,633	−4.5%
1930	142,571	+4.3%
1950	102,488	−28.1%
1961	110,156	+7.5%
1970	113,958	+3.5%

Year	Pop.	±%
1980	124,096	+8.9%
1991	125,972	+1.5%
2001	126,355	+0.3%
2011	121,299	−4.0%
2021	116,539	−3.9%

Source: Censuses

=== Most populous municipalities ===
Name	Population	Area (km^{2})
Šumperk	24,444	28
Zábřeh	13,157	35
Mohelnice	9,886	46
Nový Malín	3,637	27
Rapotín	3,322	14
Libina	3,230	27
Loštice	3,078	12
Bludov	2,972	17
Postřelmov	2,894	10
Hanušovice	2,837	37

== Economy ==
The largest employers with headquarters in Šumperk District and at least 500 employees are:

Economic entity	Location	Number of employees	Main activity
Hella Autotechnik Nova	Mohelnice	2,500–2,999	Manufacture of lighting for the automotive industry
Šumperk Hospital	Šumperk	1,500–1,999	Health care
OP papírna	Olšany	500–999	Manufacture of paper
Dormer Pramet	Šumperk	500–999	Manufacture of cutting tools
Škoda Pars	Šumperk	500–999	Repair and maintenance of rolling stock
TDK Electronics	Šumperk	500–999	Manufacture of ferrites for the automotive industry

== Transport ==
The D35 motorway (part of the European route E442) from Olomouc ends in Mohelnice and further continues as the I/35 road. The I/44 road separates from it and runs across the district to the north.

== Sights ==
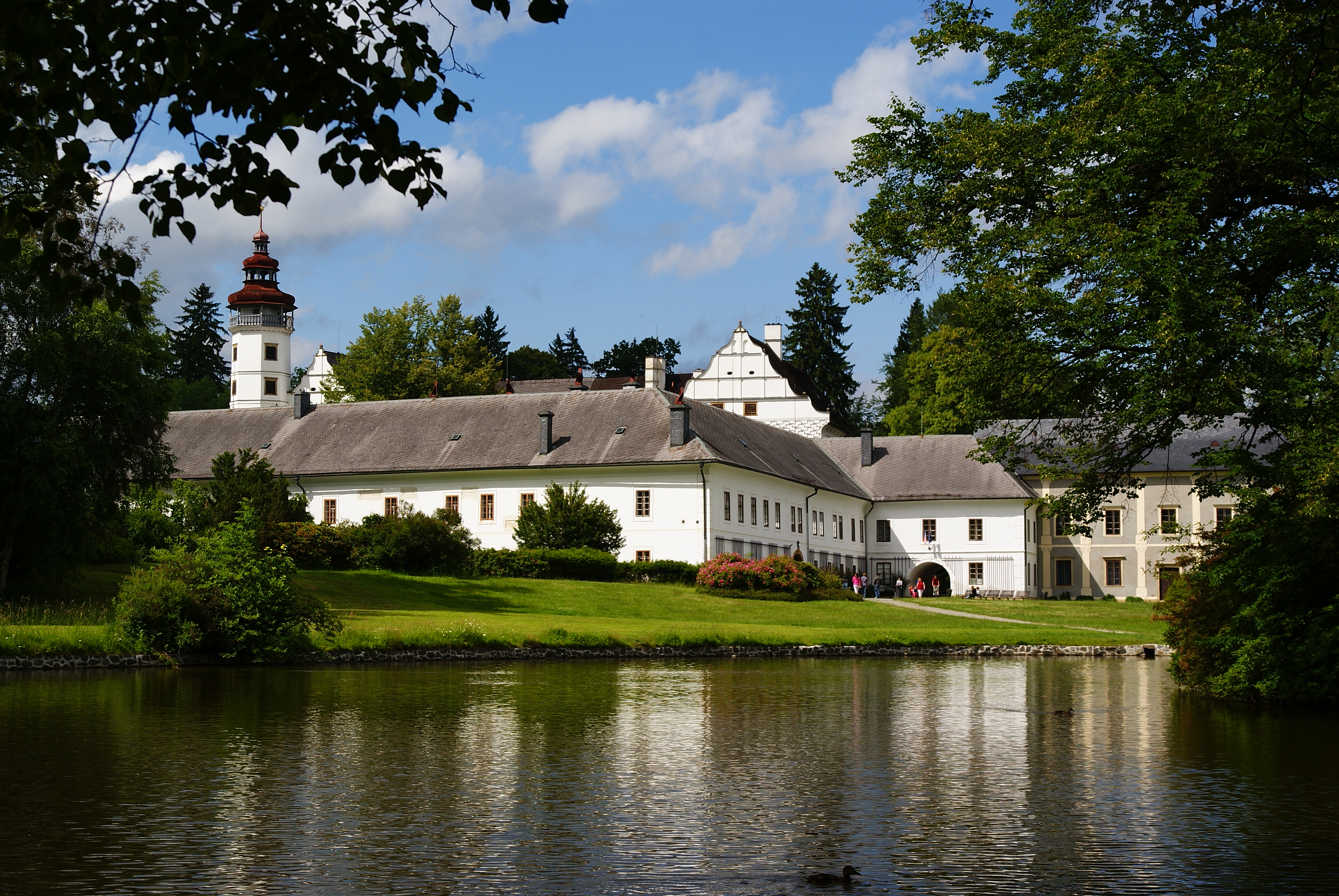
Velké Losiny Castle

The most important monuments in the district, protected as national cultural monuments, are:

- Velké Losiny Castle
- Paper Mill at Velké Losiny
- Hydroelectric power plant in Třeština

The best-preserved settlements, protected as monument zones, are:

- Branná
- Mohelnice
- Štíty
- Šumperk
- Dlouhomilov
- Jakubovice
- Palonín
- Třeština

The most visited tourist destinations are the thermal water park in Velké Losiny and Dlouhé stráně Hydro Power Plant.
