= Rovensko (Šumperk District) =

- Municipality
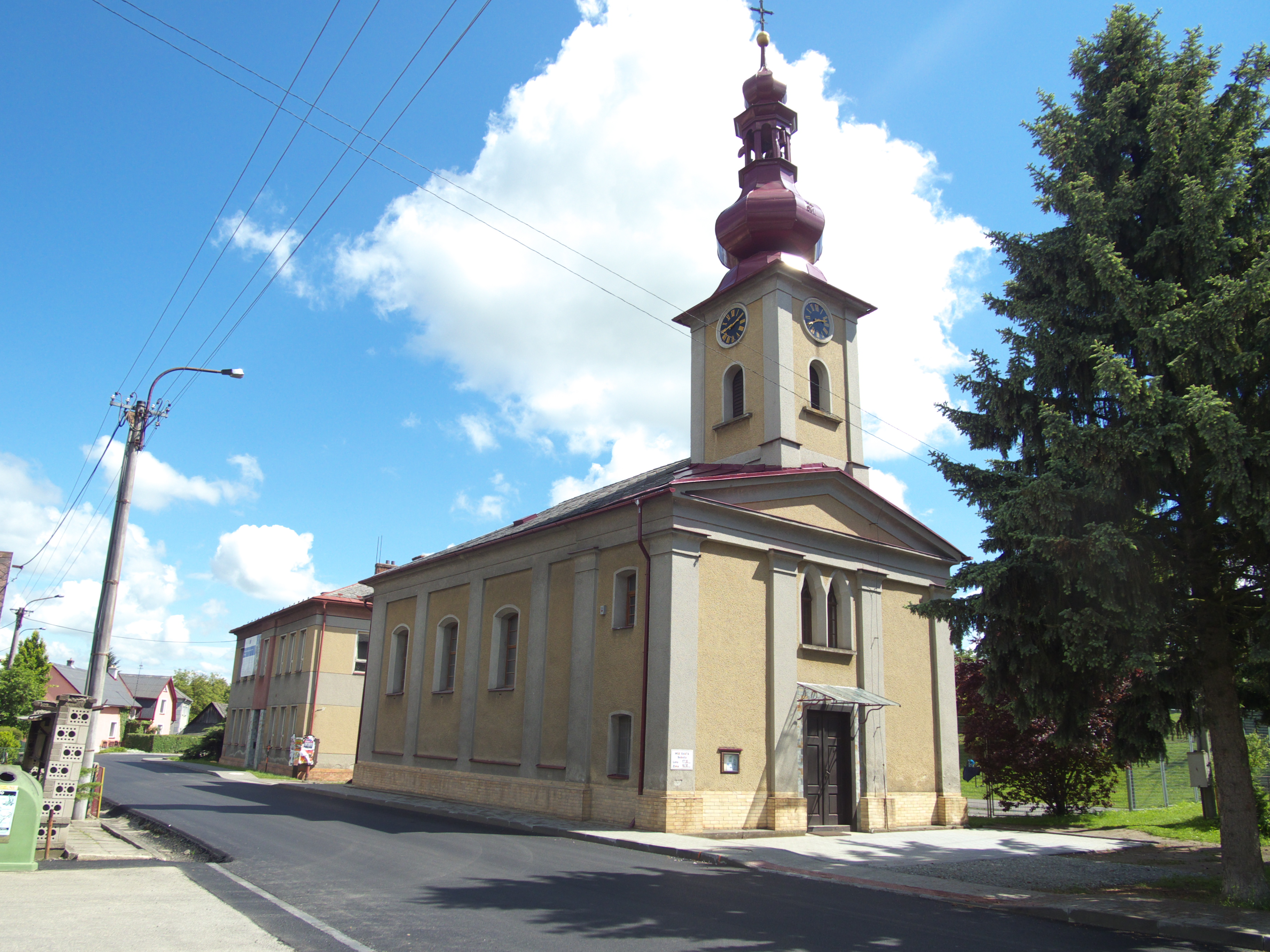
- Chapel of the Nativity of Our Lady

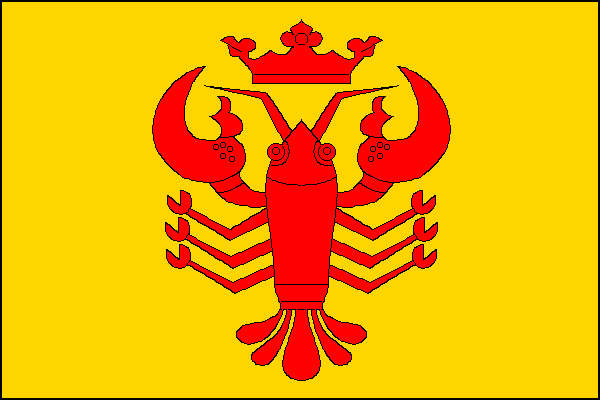
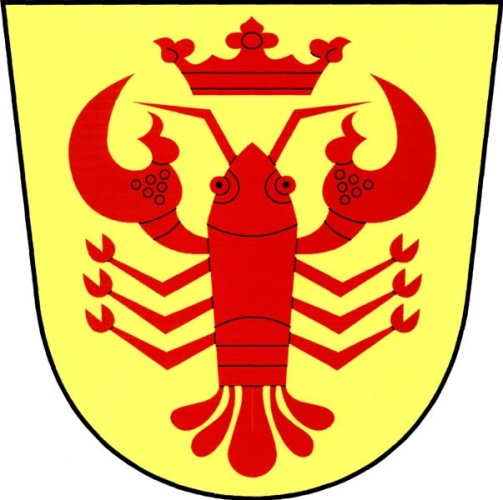
- Flag Coat of arms

- Location in the Czech Republic
- Coordinates: 49°54′28″N 16°52′35″E
- Country: Czech Republic
- Region: Olomouc
- District: Šumperk
- First mentioned: 1373

Area
  - Total: 7.43 km^{2} (2.87 sq mi)
- Elevation: 298 m (978 ft)

Population (2026-01-01)
  - Total: 815
  - Density: 110/km^{2} (284/sq mi)
- Time zone: UTC+1 (CET)
  - Summer (DST): UTC+2 (CEST)
- Postal codes: 789 01
- Website: www.rovensko-morava.cz

Rovensko is a municipality and village in Šumperk District in the Olomouc Region of the Czech Republic. It has about 800 inhabitants.

Rovensko lies approximately 10 kilometres (6 mi) south-west of Šumperk, 45 km (28 mi) north-west of Olomouc, and 177 km (110 mi) east of Prague.

== Demographics ==
Historical population
Year	Pop.	±%
1869	617	—
1880	685	+11.0%
1890	677	−1.2%
1900	744	+9.9%
1910	764	+2.7%
1921	749	−2.0%
1930	746	−0.4%
1950	676	−9.4%
1961	721	+6.7%
1970	710	−1.5%
1980	714	+0.6%
1991	674	−5.6%
2001	732	+8.6%
2011	768	+4.9%
2021	770	+0.3%
Source: Censuses
