= Hraběšice =

- Municipality
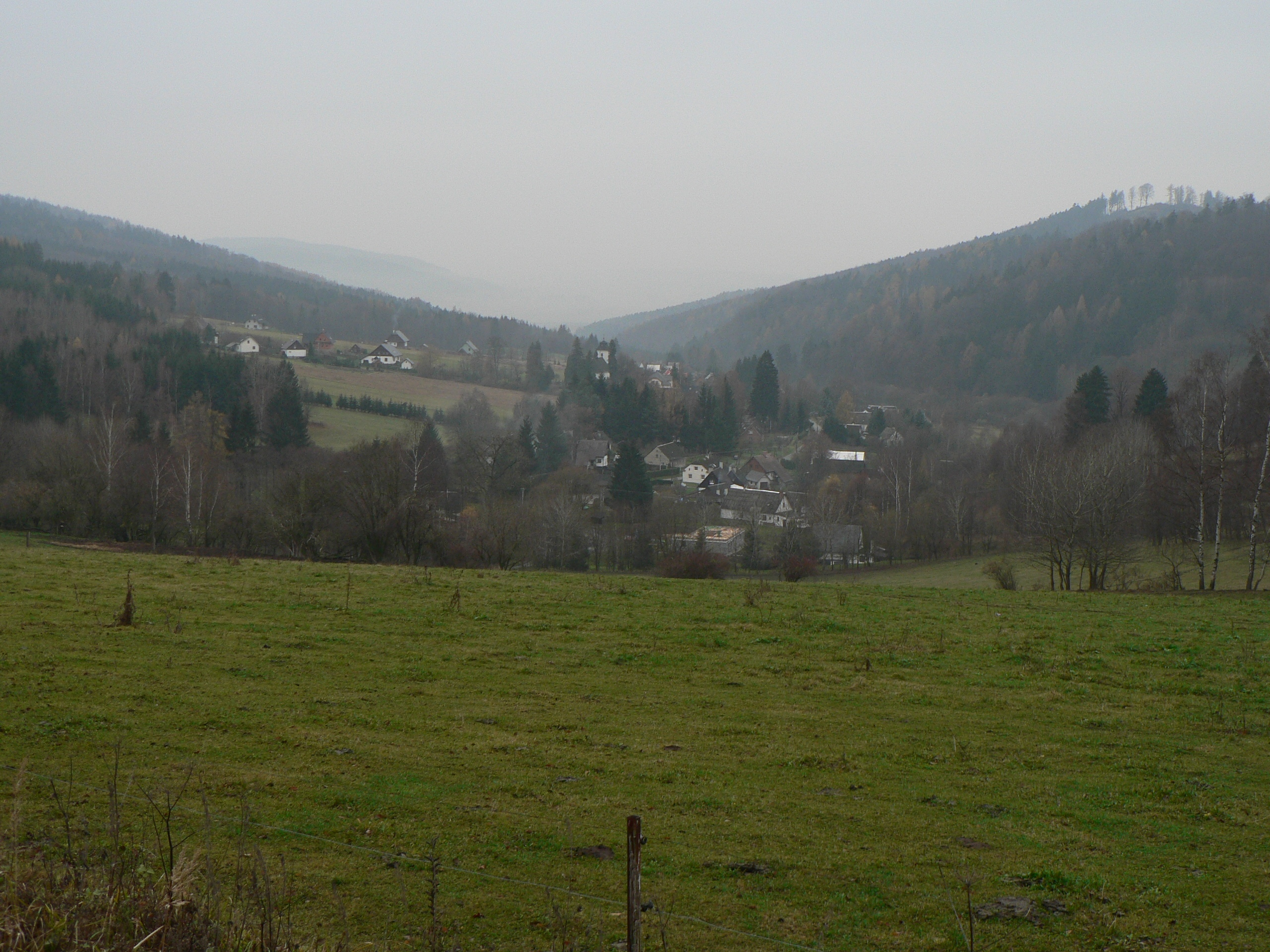
- View from the east

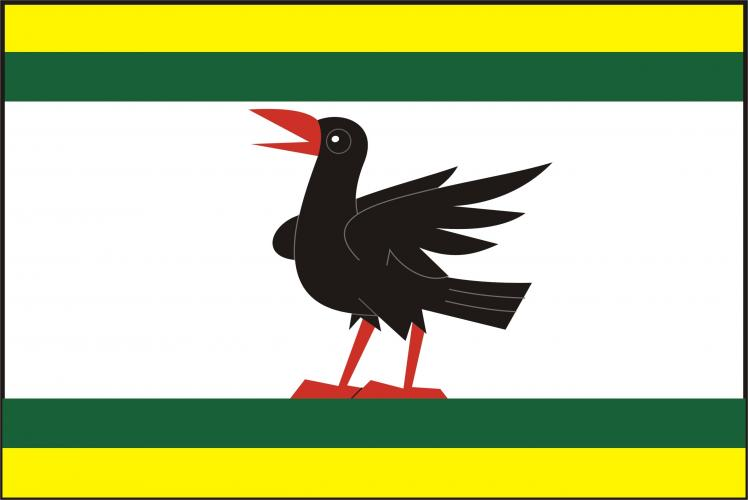
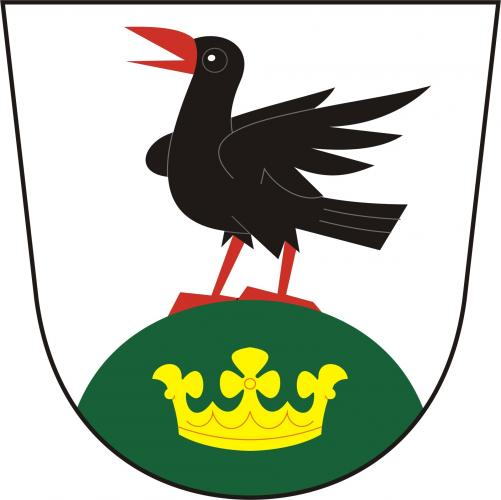
- Flag Coat of arms

- Location in the Czech Republic
- Coordinates: 49°58′36″N 17°4′46″E
- Country: Czech Republic
- Region: Olomouc
- District: Šumperk
- First mentioned: 1569

Area
  - Total: 8.23 km^{2} (3.18 sq mi)
- Elevation: 530 m (1,740 ft)

Population (2026-01-01)
  - Total: 205
  - Density: 24.9/km^{2} (64.5/sq mi)
- Time zone: UTC+1 (CET)
  - Summer (DST): UTC+2 (CEST)
- Postal codes: 788 15
- Website: www.hrabesice.eu

Hraběšice (German: Rabenseifen) is a municipality and village in Šumperk District in the Olomouc Region of the Czech Republic. It has about 200 inhabitants.

Hraběšice lies approximately 8 kilometres (5 mi) east of Šumperk, 44 km (27 mi) north of Olomouc, and 191 km (119 mi) east of Prague.

== Demographics ==
Historical population
Year	Pop.	±%
1869	727	—
1880	751	+3.3%
1890	707	−5.9%
1900	639	−9.6%
1910	566	−11.4%
1921	479	−15.4%
1930	461	−3.8%
1950	202	−56.2%
1961	234	+15.8%
1970	157	−32.9%
1980	103	−34.4%
1991	63	−38.8%
2001	101	+60.3%
2011	129	+27.7%
2021	180	+39.5%
Source: Censuses
