= Jestřebí (Šumperk District) =

- Municipality
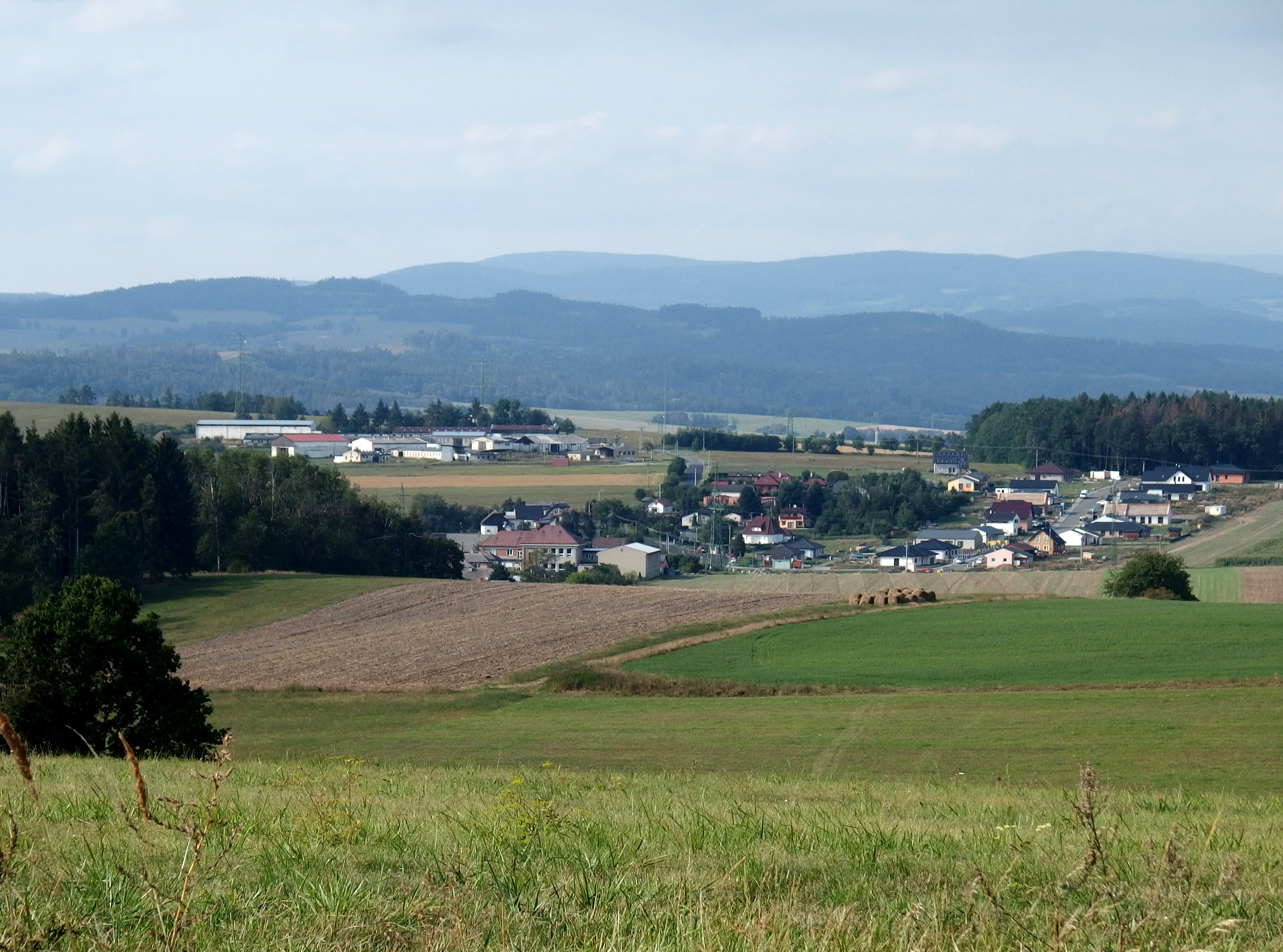
- General view

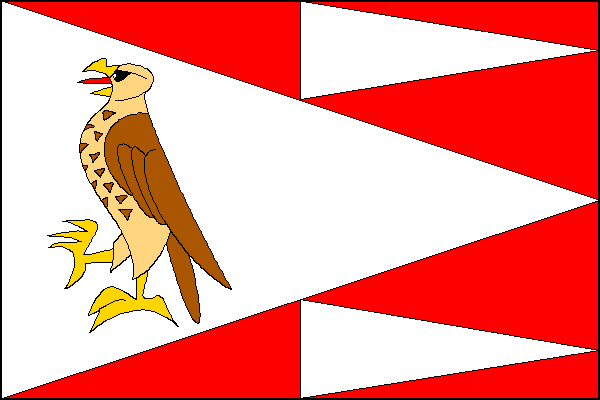
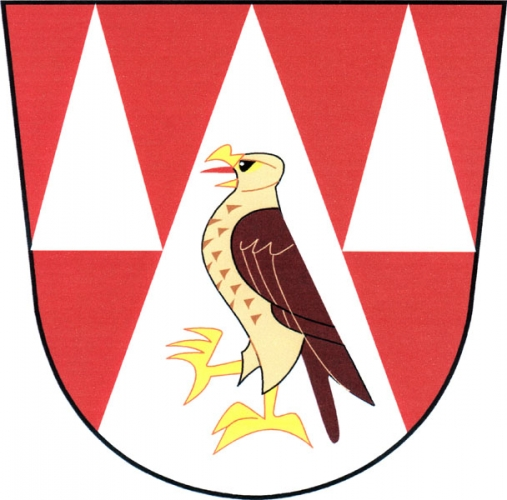
- Flag Coat of arms

- Location in the Czech Republic
- Coordinates: 49°51′8″N 16°52′7″E
- Country: Czech Republic
- Region: Olomouc
- District: Šumperk
- First mentioned: 1273

Area
  - Total: 8.69 km^{2} (3.36 sq mi)
- Elevation: 365 m (1,198 ft)

Population (2026-01-01)
  - Total: 701
  - Density: 80.7/km^{2} (209/sq mi)
- Time zone: UTC+1 (CET)
  - Summer (DST): UTC+2 (CEST)
- Postal codes: 789 01
- Website: www.obecjestrebi.cz

Jestřebí is a municipality and village in Šumperk District in the Olomouc Region of the Czech Republic. It has about 700 inhabitants.

Jestřebí lies approximately 15 kilometres (9 mi) south-west of Šumperk, 41 km (25 mi) north-west of Olomouc, and 177 km (110 mi) east of Prague.

== Administrative division ==
Jestřebí consists of two municipal parts (in brackets population according to the 2021 census):

- Jestřebí (526)
- Pobučí (143)

== Demographics ==
Historical population
Year	Pop.	±%
1869	934	—
1880	944	+1.1%
1890	952	+0.8%
1900	992	+4.2%
1910	927	−6.6%
1921	931	+0.4%
1930	1,043	+12.0%
1950	576	−44.8%
1961	664	+15.3%
1970	572	−13.9%
1980	597	+4.4%
1991	509	−14.7%
2001	552	+8.4%
2011	572	+3.6%
2021	669	+17.0%
Source: Censuses
