= Kolšov =

- Municipality
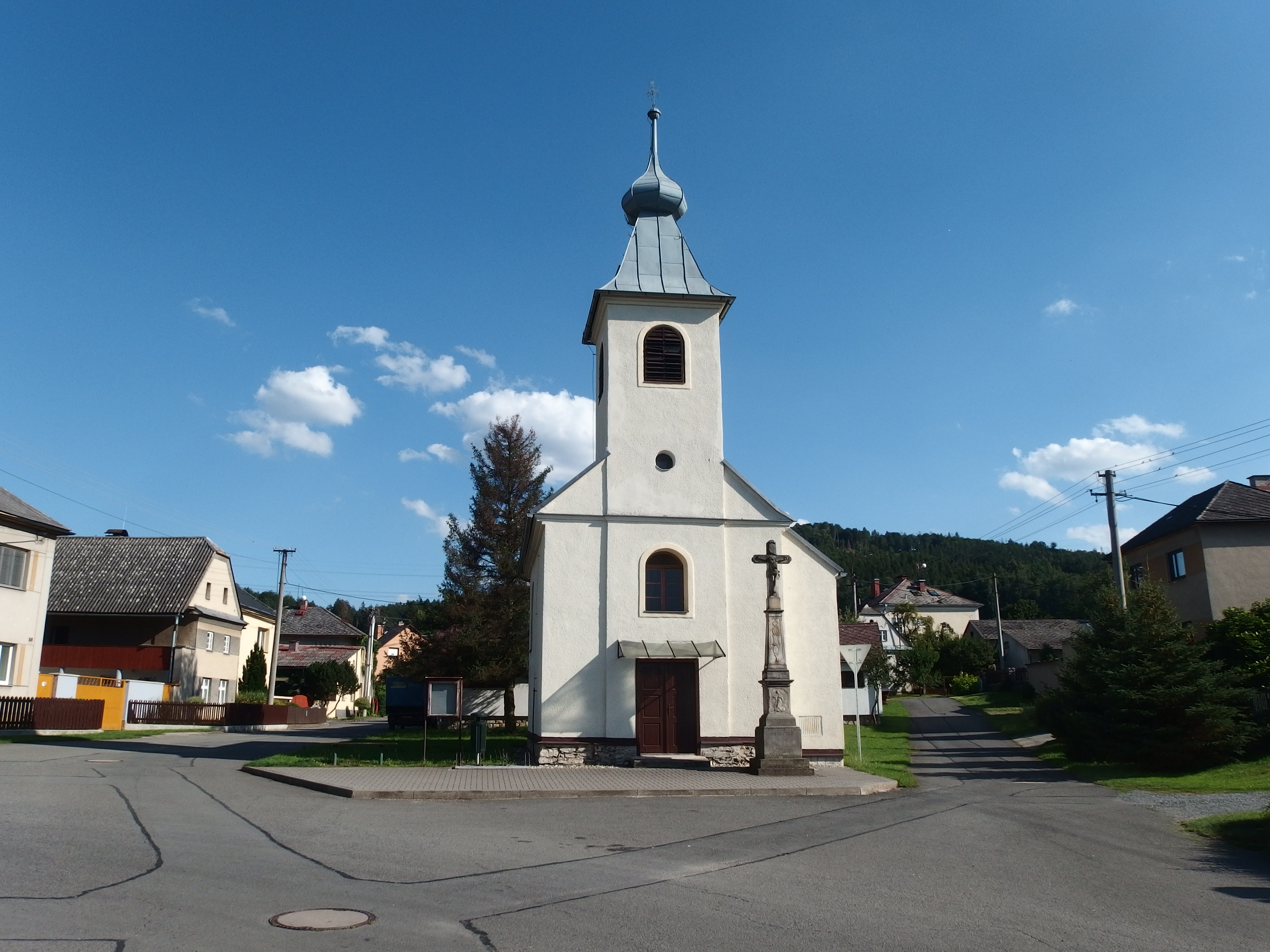
- Centre with Chapel of Saint Martin

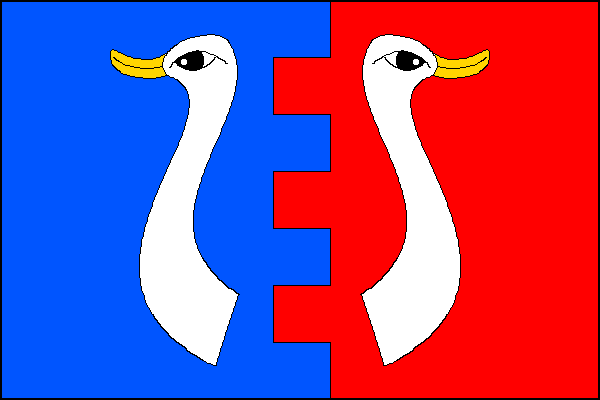
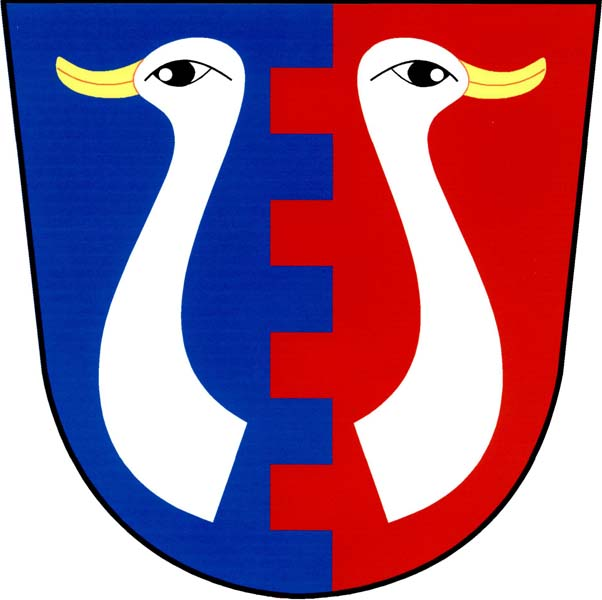
- Flag Coat of arms

- Location in the Czech Republic
- Coordinates: 49°54′11″N 16°56′51″E
- Country: Czech Republic
- Region: Olomouc
- District: Šumperk
- First mentioned: 1356

Area
  - Total: 3.76 km^{2} (1.45 sq mi)
- Elevation: 296 m (971 ft)

Population (2026-01-01)
  - Total: 701
  - Density: 186/km^{2} (483/sq mi)
- Time zone: UTC+1 (CET)
  - Summer (DST): UTC+2 (CEST)
- Postal codes: 788 21
- Website: www.kolsov.cz

Kolšov is a municipality and village in Šumperk District in the Olomouc Region of the Czech Republic. It has about 700 inhabitants.

Kolšov lies approximately 8 kilometres (5 mi) south of Šumperk, 41 km (25 mi) north-west of Olomouc, and 183 km (114 mi) east of Prague.

== Demographics ==
Historical population
Year	Pop.	±%
1869	291	—
1880	323	+11.0%
1890	380	+17.6%
1900	391	+2.9%
1910	399	+2.0%
1921	432	+8.3%
1930	484	+12.0%
1950	489	+1.0%
1961	615	+25.8%
1970	604	−1.8%
1980	682	+12.9%
1991	723	+6.0%
2001	742	+2.6%
2011	736	−0.8%
2021	666	−9.5%
Source: Censuses
