= Krchleby (Šumperk District) =

- Municipality
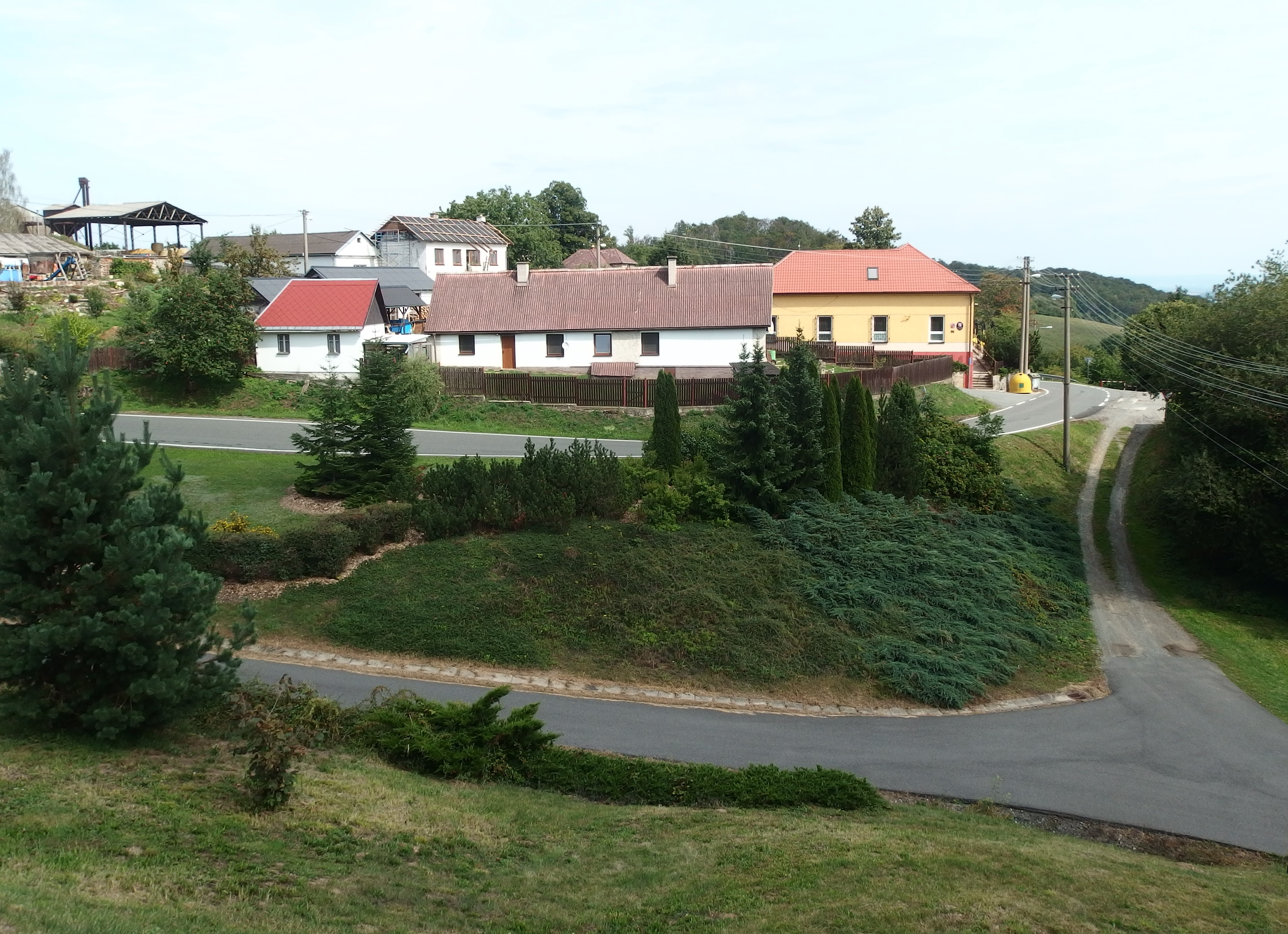
- Centre of Krchleby

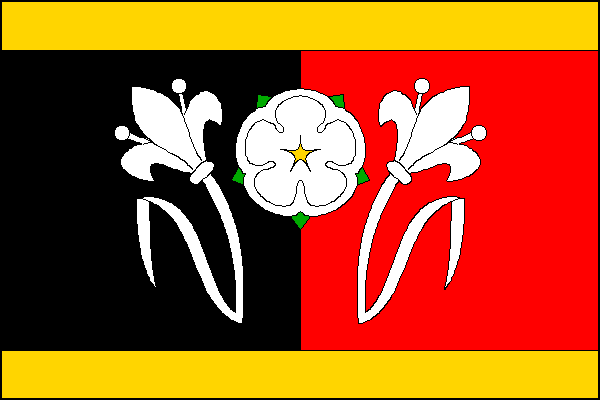
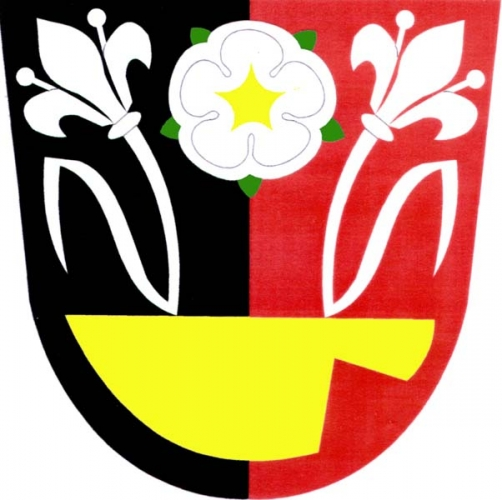
- Flag Coat of arms

- Location in the Czech Republic
- Coordinates: 49°49′15″N 16°50′1″E
- Country: Czech Republic
- Region: Olomouc
- District: Šumperk
- First mentioned: 1273

Area
  - Total: 6.90 km^{2} (2.66 sq mi)
- Elevation: 380 m (1,250 ft)

Population (2026-01-01)
  - Total: 168
  - Density: 24.3/km^{2} (63.1/sq mi)
- Time zone: UTC+1 (CET)
  - Summer (DST): UTC+2 (CEST)
- Postal codes: 789 01
- Website: www.krchlebyobec.cz

Krchleby (German: Chirles) is a municipality and village in Šumperk District in the Olomouc Region of the Czech Republic. It has about 200 inhabitants.

Krchleby lies approximately 20 kilometres (12 mi) south-west of Šumperk, 41 km (25 mi) north-west of Olomouc, and 174 km (108 mi) east of Prague.

== History ==
The first written mention of Krchleby is from 1273.

== Demographics ==
Historical population
Year	Pop.	±%
1869	523	—
1880	505	−3.4%
1890	494	−2.2%
1900	462	−6.5%
1910	443	−4.1%
1921	428	−3.4%
1930	398	−7.0%
1950	128	−67.8%
1961	142	+10.9%
1970	192	+35.2%
1980	164	−14.6%
1991	168	+2.4%
2001	170	+1.2%
2011	164	−3.5%
2021	164	+0.0%
Source: Censuses
