= Jedlí =

- Municipality
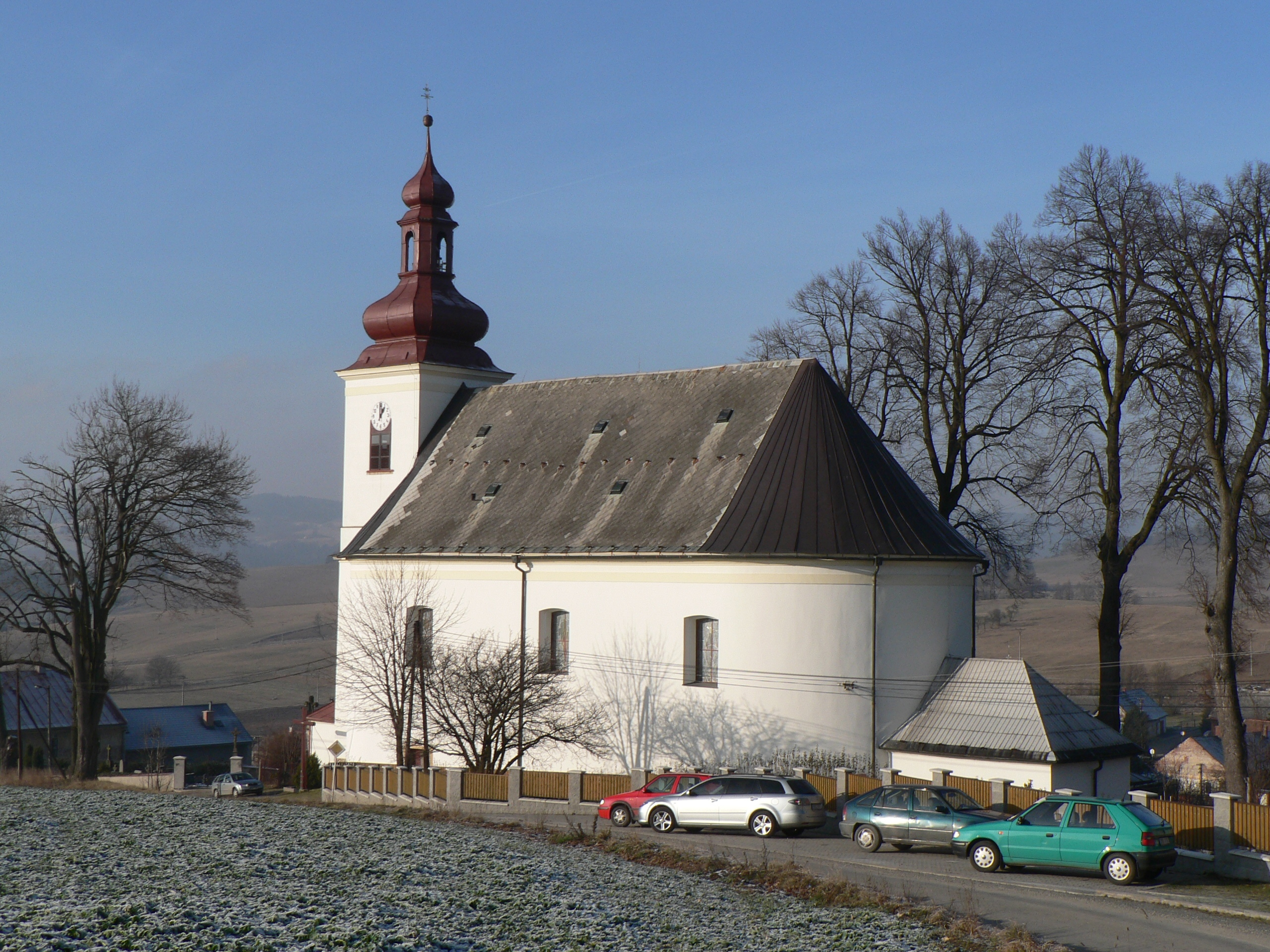
- Church of Saint John the Baptist

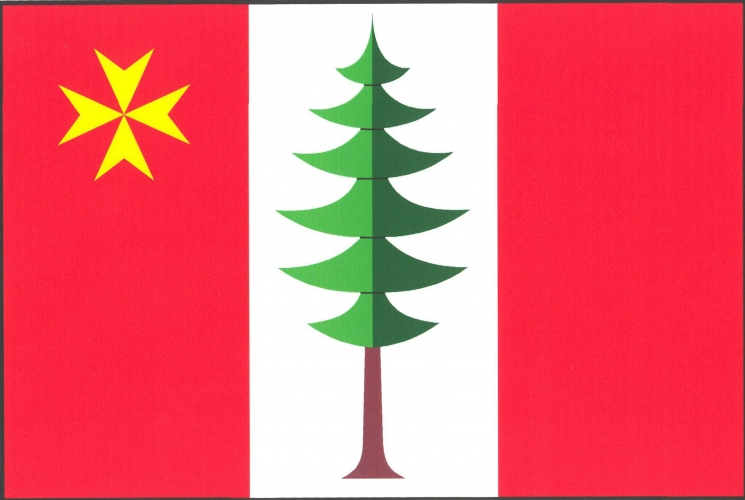
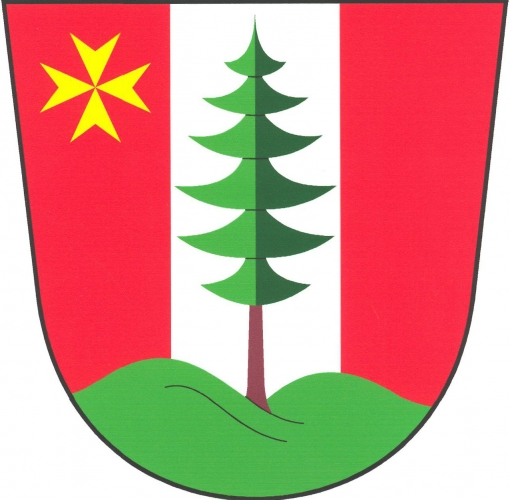
- Flag Coat of arms

- Location in the Czech Republic
- Coordinates: 49°55′52″N 16°47′41″E
- Country: Czech Republic
- Region: Olomouc
- District: Šumperk
- First mentioned: 1351

Area
  - Total: 9.93 km^{2} (3.83 sq mi)
- Elevation: 485 m (1,591 ft)

Population (2026-01-01)
  - Total: 662
  - Density: 66.7/km^{2} (173/sq mi)
- Time zone: UTC+1 (CET)
  - Summer (DST): UTC+2 (CEST)
- Postal codes: 789 92
- Website: jedli.zabrezsko.cz

Jedlí is a municipality and village in Šumperk District in the Olomouc Region of the Czech Republic. It has about 700 inhabitants.

Jedlí lies approximately 14 kilometres (9 mi) west of Šumperk, 51 km (32 mi) north-west of Olomouc, and 171 km (106 mi) east of Prague.

== Demographics ==
Historical population
Year	Pop.	±%
1869	1,576	—
1880	1,462	−7.2%
1890	1,396	−4.5%
1900	1,287	−7.8%
1910	1,214	−5.7%
1921	1,175	−3.2%
1930	1,180	+0.4%
1950	813	−31.1%
1961	820	+0.9%
1970	775	−5.5%
1980	763	−1.5%
1991	723	−5.2%
2001	711	−1.7%
2011	697	−2.0%
2021	665	−4.6%
Source: Censuses
