= Hrabová (Šumperk District) =

- Municipality
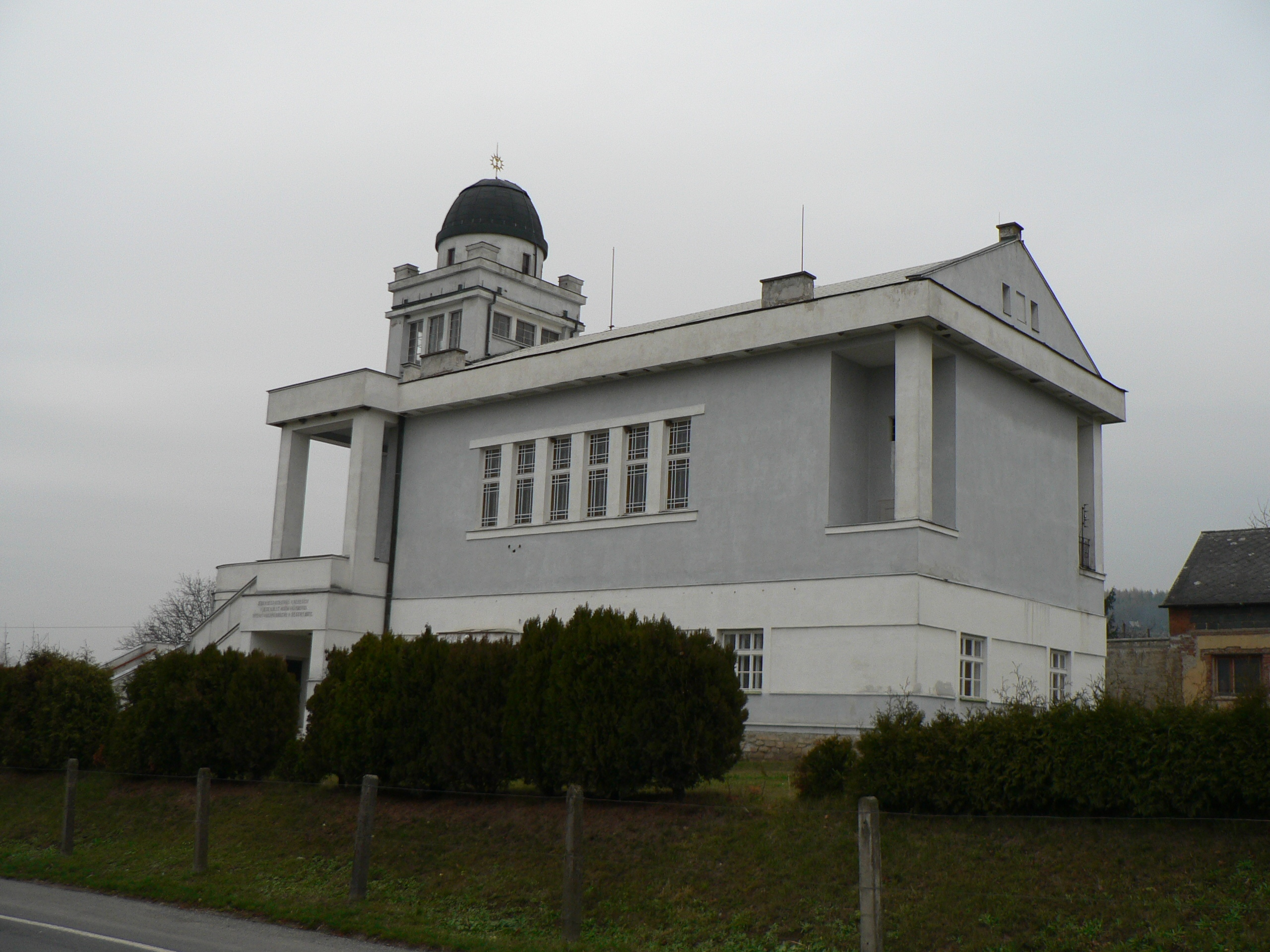
- Evangelical church

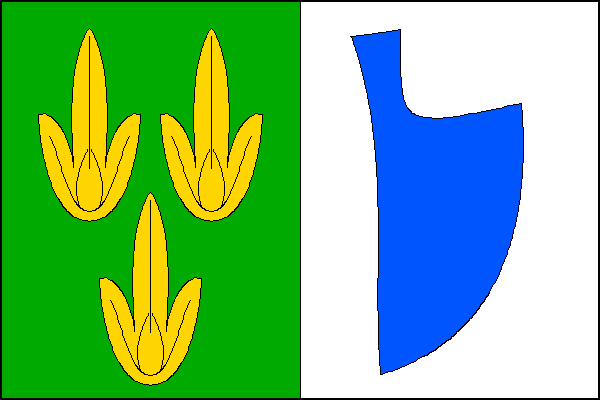
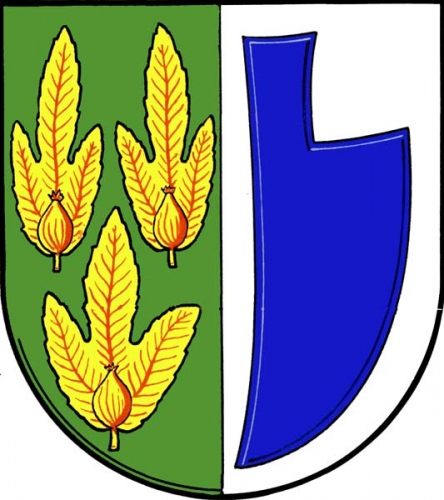
- Flag Coat of arms

- Location in the Czech Republic
- Coordinates: 49°50′44″N 16°57′14″E
- Country: Czech Republic
- Region: Olomouc
- District: Šumperk
- First mentioned: 1343

Area
  - Total: 8.11 km^{2} (3.13 sq mi)
- Elevation: 290 m (950 ft)

Population (2026-01-01)
  - Total: 713
  - Density: 87.9/km^{2} (228/sq mi)
- Time zone: UTC+1 (CET)
  - Summer (DST): UTC+2 (CEST)
- Postal codes: 789 01
- Website: www.obechrabova.cz

Hrabová (German: Raabe) is a municipality and village in Šumperk District in the Olomouc Region of the Czech Republic. It has about 700 inhabitants.

Hrabová lies approximately 13 kilometres (8 mi) south of Šumperk, 36 km (22 mi) north-west of Olomouc, and 184 km (114 mi) east of Prague.

== Demographics ==
Historical population
Year	Pop.	±%
1869	606	—
1880	650	+7.3%
1890	689	+6.0%
1900	840	+21.9%
1910	928	+10.5%
1921	819	−11.7%
1930	854	+4.3%
1950	619	−27.5%
1961	711	+14.9%
1970	696	−2.1%
1980	647	−7.0%
1991	609	−5.9%
2001	557	−8.5%
2011	584	+4.8%
2021	637	+9.1%
Source: Censuses
