= Gruna, Czech Republic =

Gruna
- Municipality
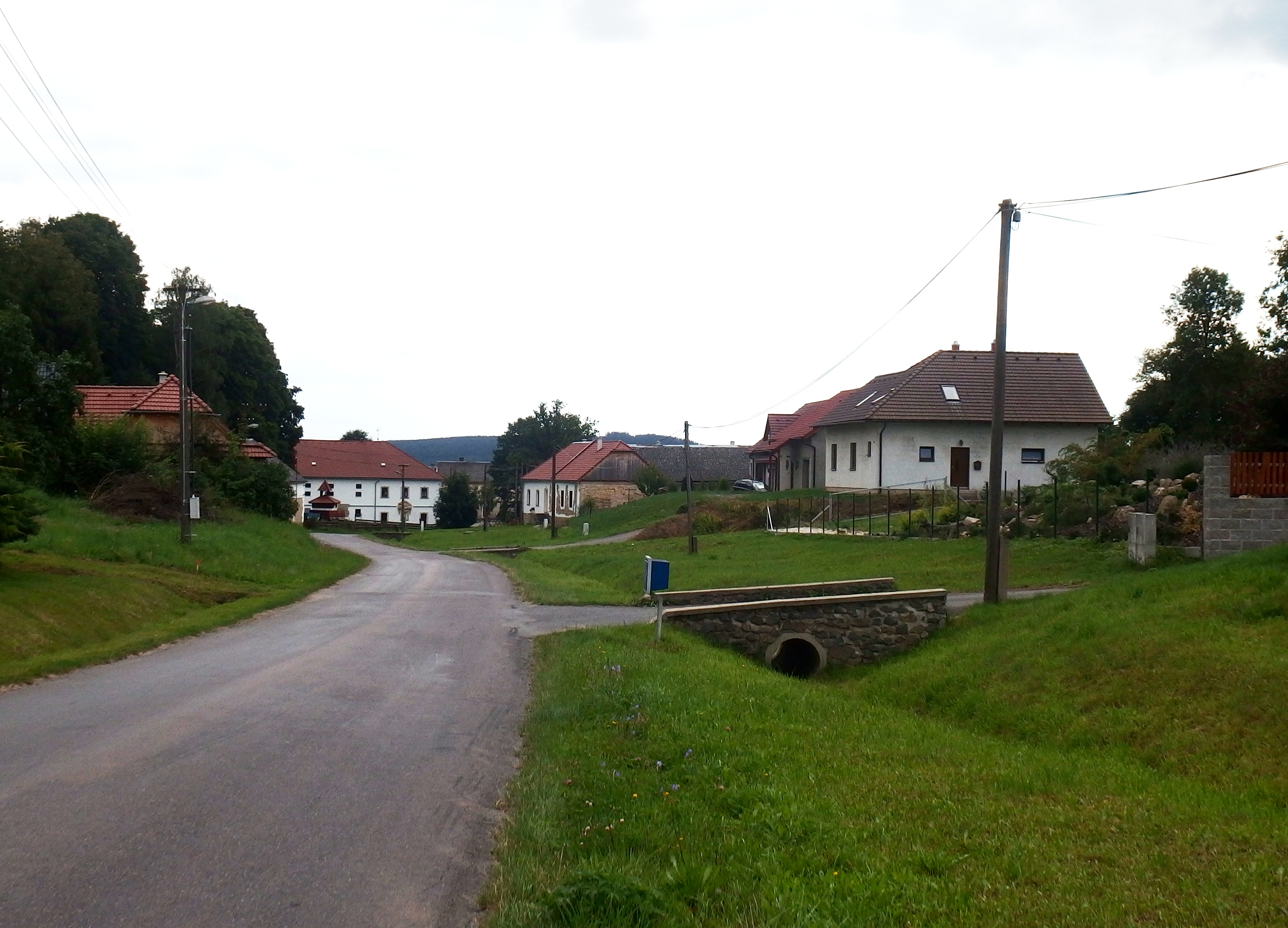
- Centre of Gruna

- Flag Coat of arms

- Location in the Czech Republic
- Coordinates: 49°45′46″N 16°44′34″E
- Country: Czech Republic
- Region: Pardubice
- District: Svitavy
- First mentioned: 1270

Area
  - Total: 10.37 km^{2} (4.00 sq mi)
- Elevation: 408 m (1,339 ft)

Population (2026-01-01)
  - Total: 246
  - Density: 23.7/km^{2} (61.4/sq mi)
- Time zone: UTC+1 (CET)
  - Summer (DST): UTC+2 (CEST)
- Postal code: 571 01
- Website: www.gruna.eu

Gruna (German: Grünau) is a municipality and village in Svitavy District in the Pardubice Region of the Czech Republic. It has about 200 inhabitants.

== Administrative division ==
Gruna consists of two municipal parts (in brackets population according to the 2021 census):

- Gruna (176)
- Žipotín (56)

== Geography ==
Gruna is located about 19 kilometres (12 mi) east of Svitavy and 40 km (25 mi) northwest of Olomouc. It lies on the border between the Zábřeh Highlands and Orlické Foothills. The highest point is a nameless hill at 582 m (1,909 ft) above sea level. The Třebůvka River briefly crosses the municipal territory in the southwest. The brook Grunský potok originates here and then flows through the village into the Třebůvka.

== History ==
The first written mention of Gruna and Žipotín is from 1365, when Gruna belonged to the Moravská Třebová estate and Žipotín to the Cimburk estate. From 1398 at the latest, Žipotín was also a part of the Moravská Třebová estate. For almost its entire history, Gruna was an agricultural village.

== Demographics ==
Historical population

Year	Pop.	±%
1869	882	—
1880	865	−1.9%
1890	811	−6.2%
1900	736	−9.2%
1910	682	−7.3%

Year	Pop.	±%
1921	618	−9.4%
1930	645	+4.4%
1950	289	−55.2%
1961	294	+1.7%
1970	265	−9.9%

Year	Pop.	±%
1980	212	−20.0%
1991	168	−20.8%
2001	160	−4.8%
2011	145	−9.4%
2021	232	+60.0%

Source: Censuses

== Transport ==
The I/35 road (part of the European route E442) passes through the municipality. It replaces the unfinished section of the D35 motorway from Olomouc to the Hradec Králové Region.

== Sights ==
Among the protected cultural monuments in the municipality are a rural homestead from the first half of the 19th century (an example of local folk architecture) and a locality with remains of a fortified market settlement called Radkov (today an archaeological site).
