= Postřelmůvek =

- Municipality
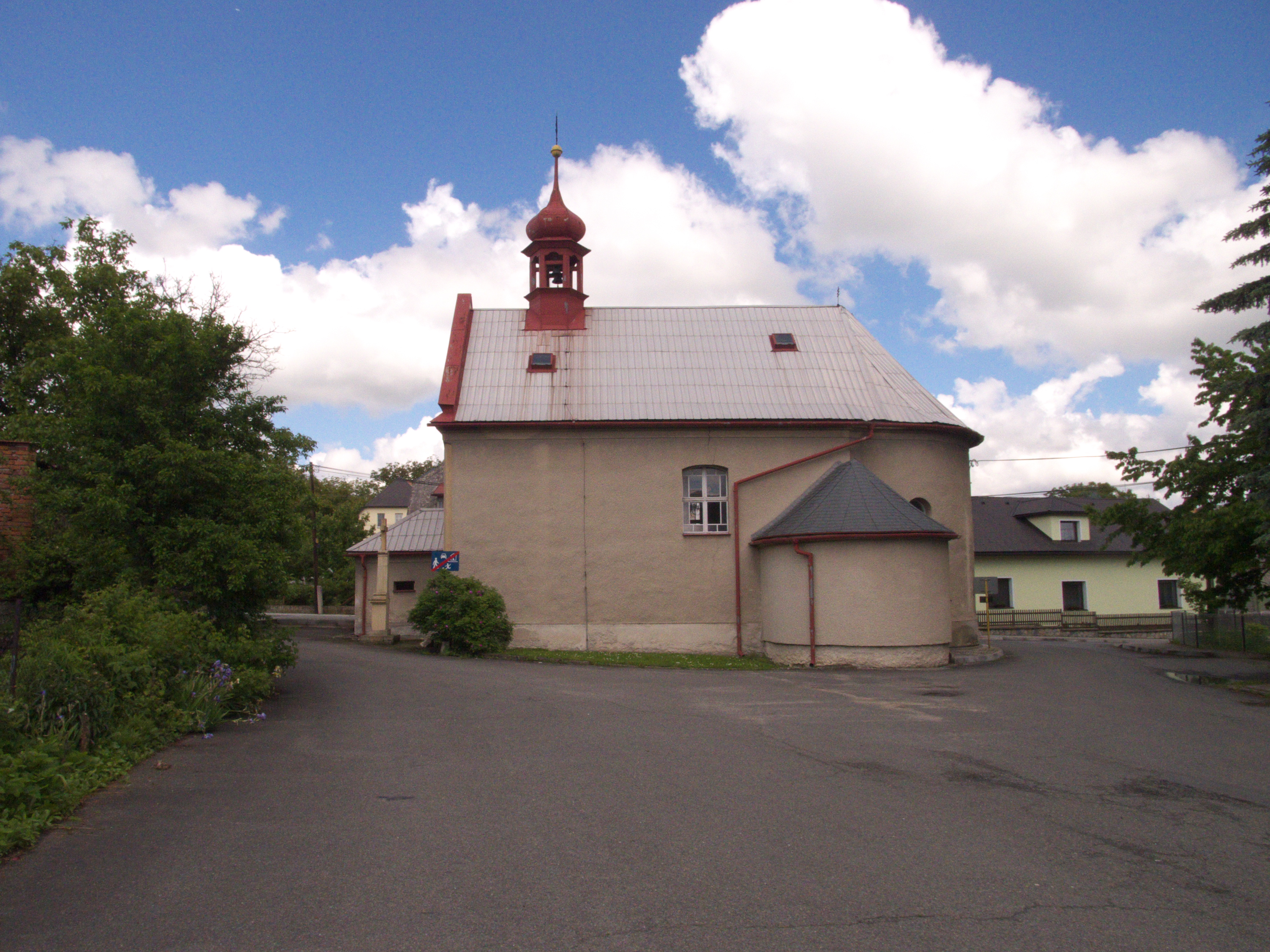
- Chapel of Saint Michael

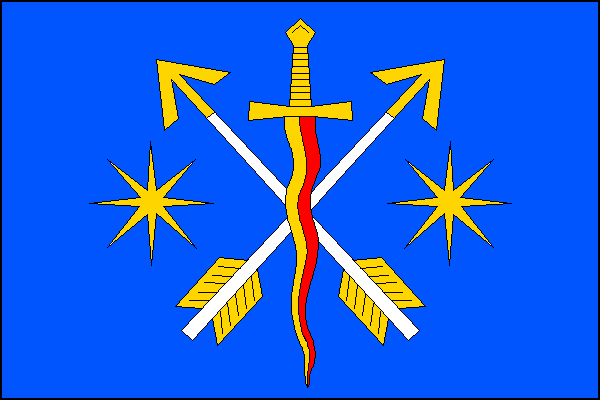
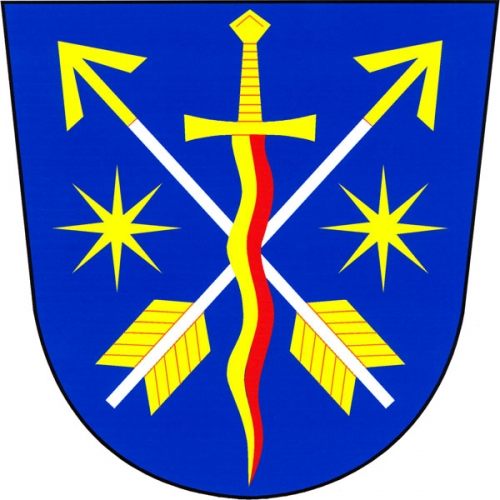
- Flag Coat of arms

- Location in the Czech Republic
- Coordinates: 49°55′22″N 16°52′45″E
- Country: Czech Republic
- Region: Olomouc
- District: Šumperk
- First mentioned: 1361

Area
  - Total: 4.01 km^{2} (1.55 sq mi)
- Elevation: 322 m (1,056 ft)

Population (2026-01-01)
  - Total: 299
  - Density: 74.6/km^{2} (193/sq mi)
- Time zone: UTC+1 (CET)
  - Summer (DST): UTC+2 (CEST)
- Postal codes: 789 01
- Website: www.postrelmuvek.cz

Postřelmůvek (German: Klein Heilendorf) is a municipality and village in Šumperk District in the Olomouc Region of the Czech Republic. It has about 300 inhabitants.

== Etymology ==
The name is a diminutive form of Postřelmov, referring to the neighbouring municipality. Before 1918, the village was also called Malý Postřelmov ('little Postřelmov').

== Geography ==
Postřelmůvek is located about 8 kilometres (5 mi) southwest of Šumperk and 45 km (28 mi) northwest of Olomouc. It lies on the border between the Mohelnice Depression and Zábřeh Highlands. The highest point is at 574 m (1,883 ft) above sea level.

== History ==
The first written mention of Postřelmůvek is from 1361, when the village was owned by the Olomouc Chapter. After 1447, Postřelmůvek became part of the Zábřeh estate.

== Demographics ==
Historical population

Year	Pop.	±%
1869	409	—
1880	414	+1.2%
1890	422	+1.9%
1900	413	−2.1%
1910	395	−4.4%

Year	Pop.	±%
1921	404	+2.3%
1930	404	+0.0%
1950	338	−16.3%
1961	377	+11.5%
1970	358	−5.0%

Year	Pop.	±%
1980	366	+2.2%
1991	340	−7.1%
2001	341	+0.3%
2011	314	−7.9%
2021	300	−4.5%

Source: Censuses

== Transport ==
There are no railways or major roads passing through the municipality.

== Sights ==
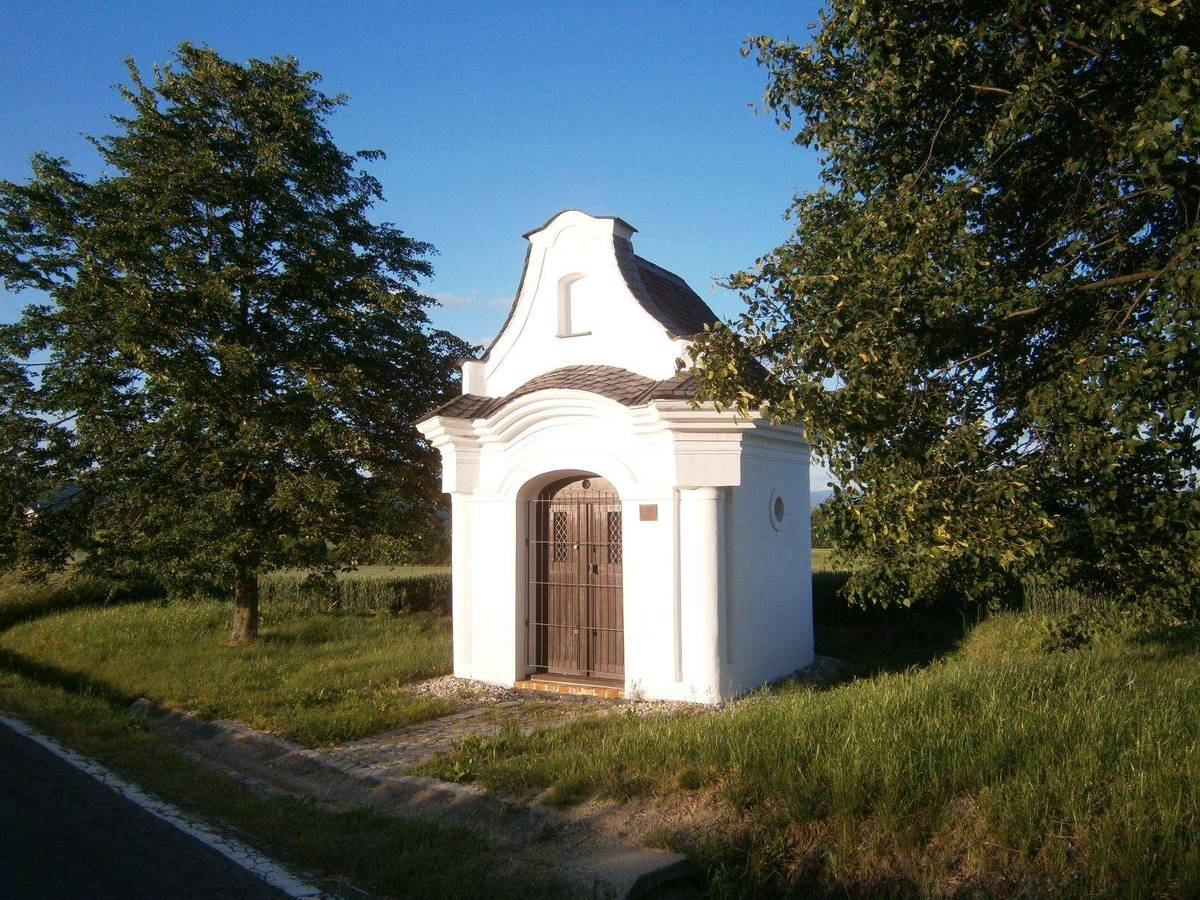
Chapel of Saint John of Nepomuk

Among the protected cultural monuments in Postřelmůvek are two rural homestead, which are well-preserved examples of local folk architecture, and the Chapel of Saint John of Nepomuk from the end of the 18th century.

The main landmark of the municipality is the Chapel of Saint Michael. It was built in 1838.
