= Janůvky =

- Municipality
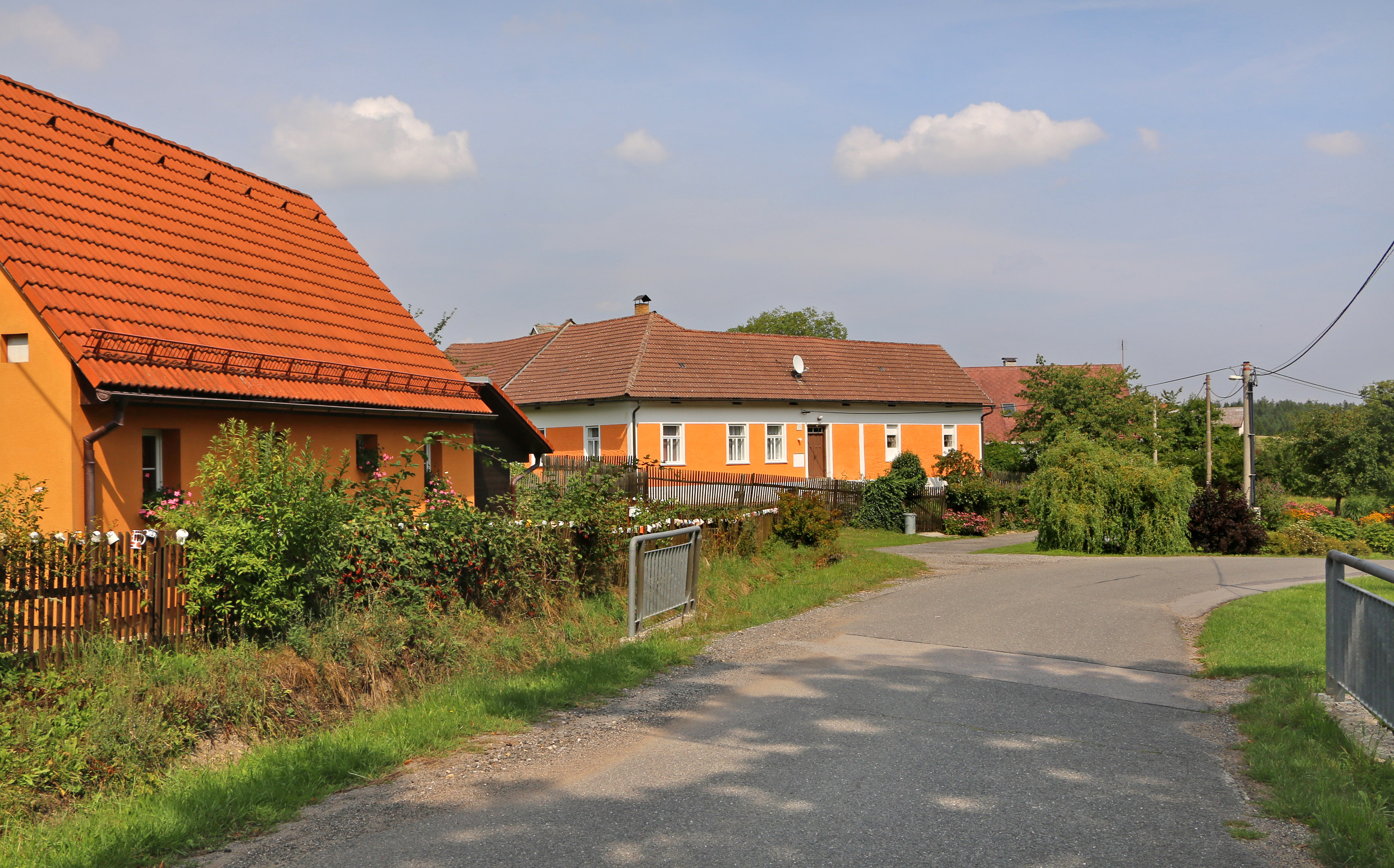
- Eastern part of Janůvky

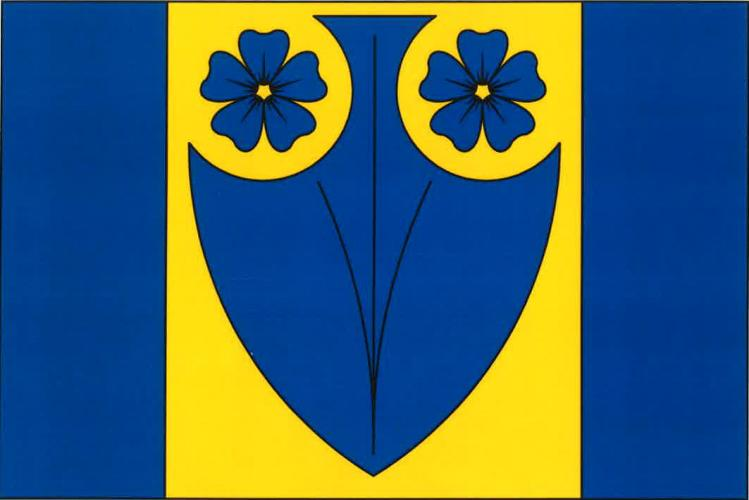
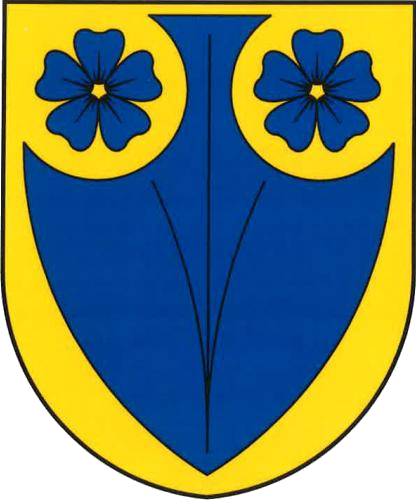
- Flag Coat of arms

- Location in the Czech Republic
- Coordinates: 49°40′18″N 16°35′32″E
- Country: Czech Republic
- Region: Pardubice
- District: Svitavy
- First mentioned: 1365

Area
  - Total: 3.13 km^{2} (1.21 sq mi)
- Elevation: 476 m (1,562 ft)

Population (2026-01-01)
  - Total: 62
  - Density: 20/km^{2} (51/sq mi)
- Time zone: UTC+1 (CET)
  - Summer (DST): UTC+2 (CEST)
- Postal code: 569 43
- Website: www.obecjanuvky.cz

Janůvky is a municipality and village in Svitavy District in the Pardubice Region of the Czech Republic. It has about 60 inhabitants.

== Geography ==
Janůvky is located about 12 kilometres (7 mi) southeast of Svitavy and 51 km (32 mi) north of Brno. It lies mostly in the Svitavy Uplands, but the eastern part of the municipal territory extends into the Orlické Foothills. The highest point is the hill Janůvské čihadlo at 606 m (1,988 ft) above sea level.

== History ==
The first written mention of Janůvky is from 1365, when it belonged to the Moravská Třebová estate. For centuries, the inhabitants made a living from agriculture and weaving. In the second half of the 19th century and at the beginning of the 20th century, mining of lignite, refractory clay and fire clay developed.

== Demographics ==
Historical population

Year	Pop.	±%
1869	409	—
1880	436	+6.6%
1890	442	+1.4%
1900	499	+12.9%
1910	450	−9.8%

Year	Pop.	±%
1921	426	−5.3%
1930	341	−20.0%
1950	145	−57.5%
1961	128	−11.7%
1970	102	−20.3%

Year	Pop.	±%
1980	82	−19.6%
1991	64	−22.0%
2001	41	−35.9%
2011	46	+12.2%
2021	56	+21.7%

Source: Censuses

== Transport ==
There are no railways or major roads passing through the municipal territory.

== Sights ==
There are no protected cultural monuments in the municipality.
