= Zábřeh Highlands =

Mountain range in the eastern Czech Republic

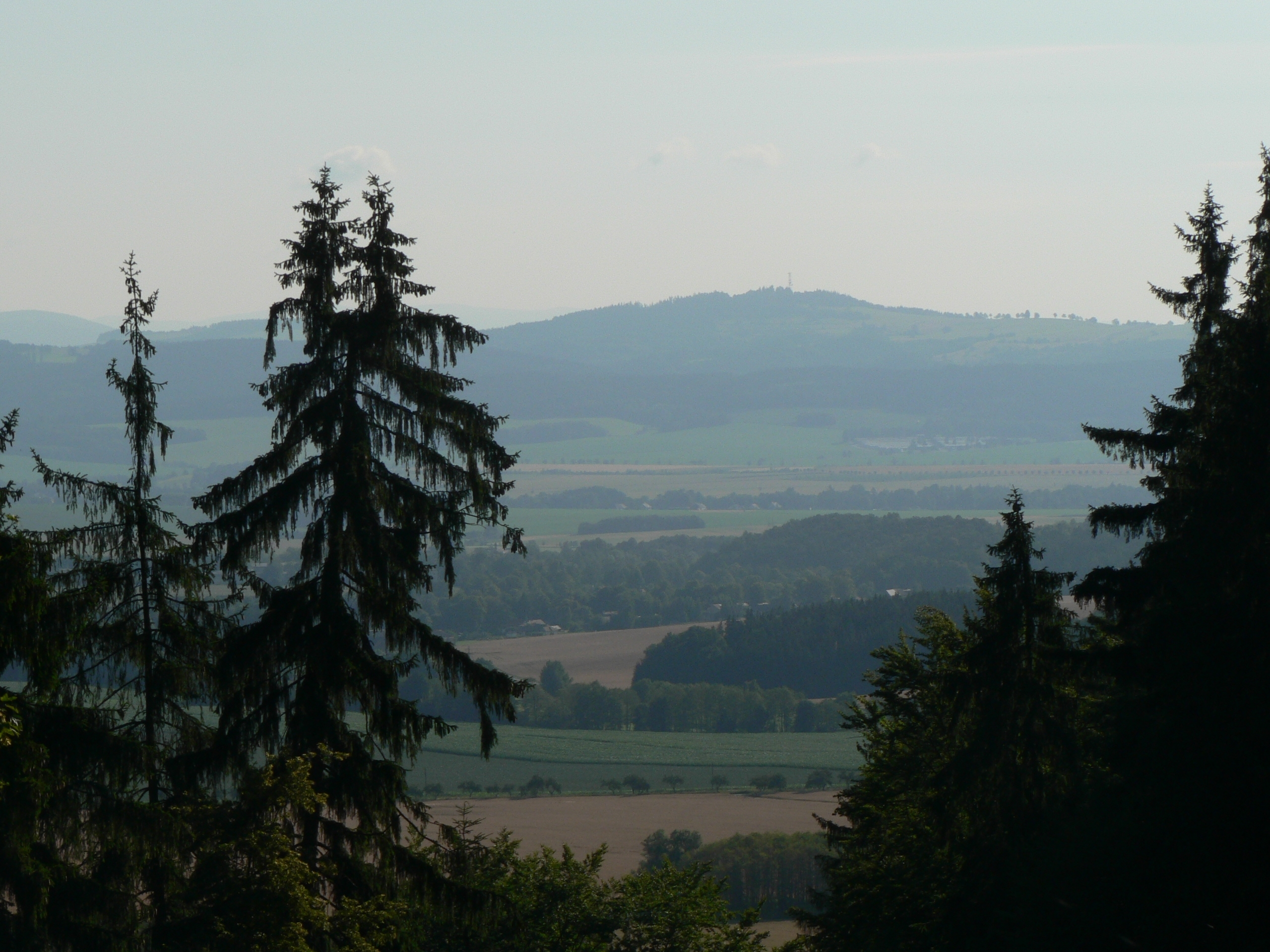
- View towards Lázek

Highest point
- Peak: Lázek
- Elevation: 715 m (2,346 ft)

Dimensions
- Length: 50 km (31 mi)
- Area: 734 km^{2} (283 mi^{2})

Geography
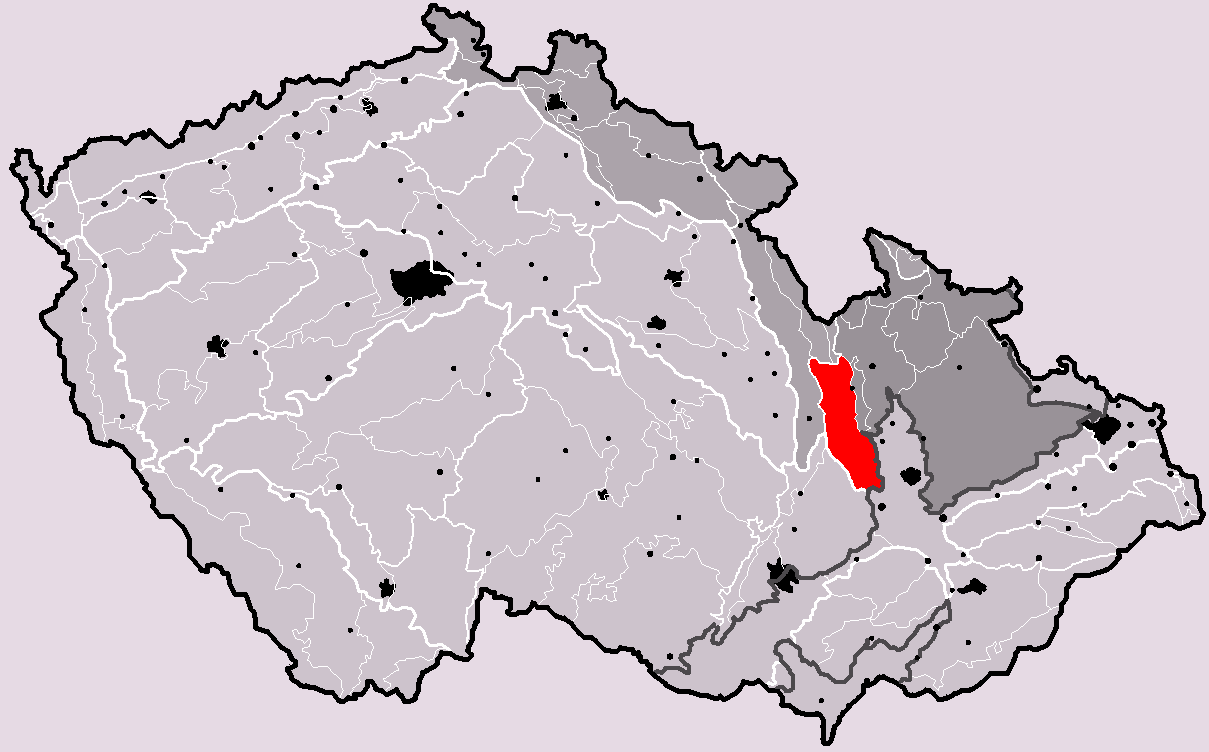
- Zábřeh Highlands in the geomorphological system of the Czech Republic
- Country: Czech Republic
- Regions: Olomouc, Pardubice
- Range coordinates: 49°45′N 16°52′E
- Parent range: Eastern Sudetes

Geology
- Rock type(s): greywacke, slate

The Zábřeh Highlands (Czech: Zábřežská vrchovina) are highlands and geomorphological mesoregion of the Czech Republic. It is located in the Olomouc and Pardubice regions.

== Geomorphology ==
The Zábřeh Highlands is a mesoregion of the Eastern Sudetes within the Bohemian Massif. The mesoregion is further subdivided into the microregions of Bouzov Highlands, Mírov Highlands and Drozdov Highlands.

The highest part of the Zábřeh Highlands is the north (Drozdov Highlands). The highest peaks of the Zábřeh Highlands are:

- Lázek, 715 m (2,346 ft)
- Vrchy, 660 m (2,170 ft)
- Švédské šance, 656 m (2,152 ft)
- Stráně, 645 m (2,116 ft)
- Pustina, 626 m (2,054 ft)
- Varta, 620 m (2,030 ft)
- Louková hora, 615 m (2,018 ft)
- Sychrov, 612 m (2,008 ft)
- Zahálkovy skalky, 610 m (2,000 ft)
- Kančí vrch, 608 m (1,995 ft)

== Geology ==
The geological bedrock is dominated by Lower Carboniferous weakly metamorphosed sediments (greywacke and slate). The southern part (Bouzov Highlands) also has a significant presence of Devonian limestones. Upper Cretaceous sediments are found in the central part (Mírov Highlands), and granitoids are exposed in the northern part (Drozdov Highlands).

== Geography ==
The Zábřeh Highlands is bordered by following mesoregions: to the south the Upper Morava Valley, to the northeast the Hanušovice Highlands, to the east the Mohelnice Depression, to the west the Orlické Foothills, to the northwest the Orlické Mountains, and to the north the Kłodzko Valley.

The Zábřeh Highlands have an area of 734 km^{2} (283 sq mi) and an average elevation of 427 m (1,401 ft).

The main rivers in the territory are Moravská Sázava and Třebůvka, whose valleys border the central part of the territory (Mírov Highlands). There are almost no significant settlements in the Zábřeh Highlands, only the eastern half of the town of Zábřeh, after which the region is named.

== Protection of nature ==
A small part of the Litovelské Pomoraví Protected Landscape Area extends into the Zábřeh Highlands.
