= Krenov =

Krenov or Křenov may refer to:

== Places in the Czech Republic ==
- Křenov, a municipality and village in the Pardubice Region
- Křenov, a village and part of Bernartice (Trutnov District) in the Hradec Králové Region
- Křenov, a hamlet and part of Dubá in the Liberec Region
- Křenov, a village and part of Kájov in the South Bohemian Region

== People ==
- James Krenov (1920–2009), Russian-American woodworker
