= Městečko Trnávka =

- Municipality
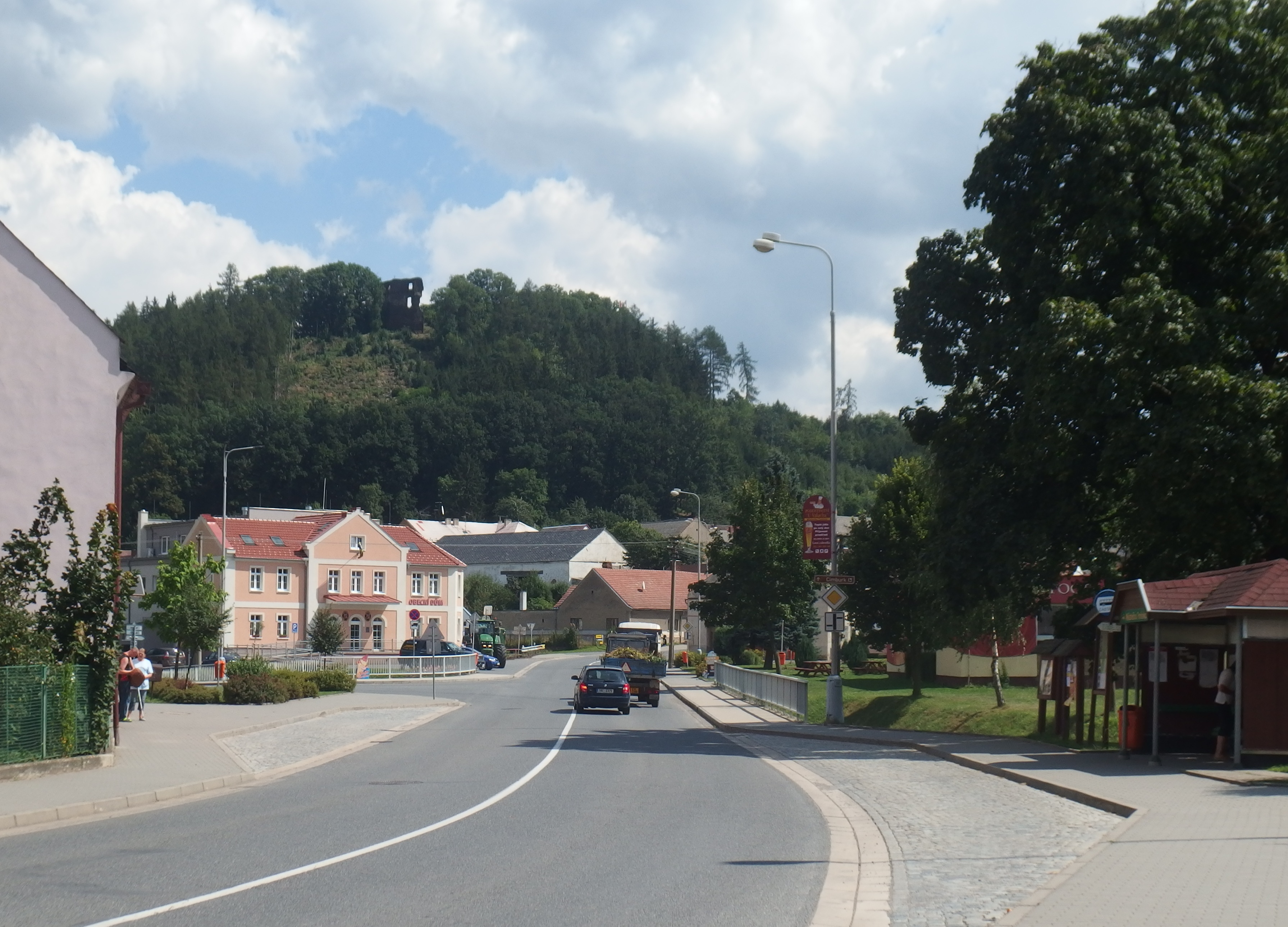
- Centre of Městečko Trnávka

- Flag Coat of arms

- Location in the Czech Republic
- Coordinates: 49°42′33″N 16°43′39″E
- Country: Czech Republic
- Region: Pardubice
- District: Svitavy
- First mentioned: 1308

Area
  - Total: 50.29 km^{2} (19.42 sq mi)
- Elevation: 318 m (1,043 ft)

Population (2026-01-01)
  - Total: 1,425
  - Density: 28.34/km^{2} (73.39/sq mi)
- Time zone: UTC+1 (CET)
  - Summer (DST): UTC+2 (CEST)
- Postal codes: 569 41, 569 43, 571 01
- Website: www.mesteckotrnavka.cz

Městečko Trnávka (German: Markt Türnau) is a municipality and village in Svitavy District in the Pardubice Region of the Czech Republic. It has about 1,400 inhabitants.

== Administrative division ==
Městečko Trnávka consists of 12 municipal parts (in brackets population according to the 2021 census):

- Městečko Trnávka (801)
- Bohdalov (38)
- Lázy (132)
- Ludvíkov (15)
- Mezihoří (50)
- Nová Roveň (11)
- Pacov (36)
- Pěčíkov (77)
- Petrůvka (38)
- Plechtinec (10)
- Přední Arnoštov (52)
- Stará Roveň (45)

== Geography ==
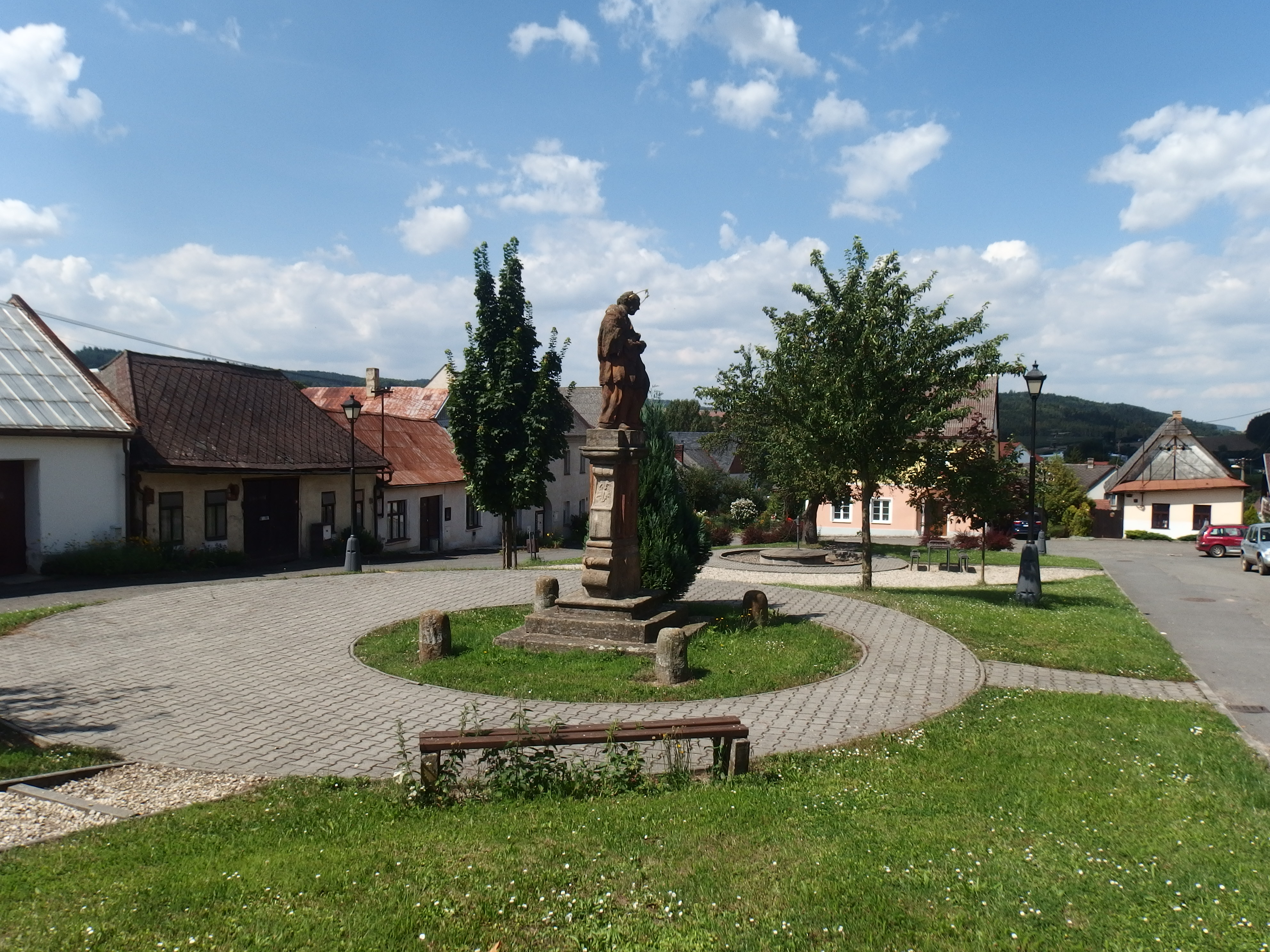
Statue of Saint John of Nepomuk

Městečko Trnávka is located about 19 kilometres (12 mi) east of Svitavy and 55 km (34 mi) north of Brno. It lies mostly in the Orlické Foothills, but the eastern part of the municipal territory extends into the Zábřeh Highlands and the southern part into the Boskovice Furrow. The highest point is the hill Hušák at 626 m (2,054 ft) above sea level. The Třebůvka River flows through the municipality.

== History ==
A village called Staré Trnávky ('old Trnávkas') existed already in the 13th century and around 1300, the village of Nové Trnávky ('new Trnávkas') was founded. The first written mention of them is from 1308.

In 1918, both municipalities were merged under the name "Trnávka". In 1929, its name was changed to Městečko Trnávka.

Due to the Munich Agreement, the municipality was annexed by Nazi Germany in 1938. After World War II, the German-speaking inhabitants were expelled. The area was later repopulated by Czechs.

== Demographics ==
Historical population

Year	Pop.	±%
1869	3,534	—
1880	3,504	−0.8%
1890	3,439	−1.9%
1900	3,233	−6.0%
1910	3,121	−3.5%

Year	Pop.	±%
1921	2,999	−3.9%
1930	2,879	−4.0%
1950	2,017	−29.9%
1961	2,008	−0.4%
1970	1,792	−10.8%

Year	Pop.	±%
1980	1,676	−6.5%
1991	1,600	−4.5%
2001	1,527	−4.6%
2011	1,389	−9.0%
2021	1,305	−6.0%

Source: Censuses

== Transport ==
Městečko Trnávka is located on the railway line Česká Třebová–Dzbel, but trains run on it only on weekends and holidays.

== Sights ==
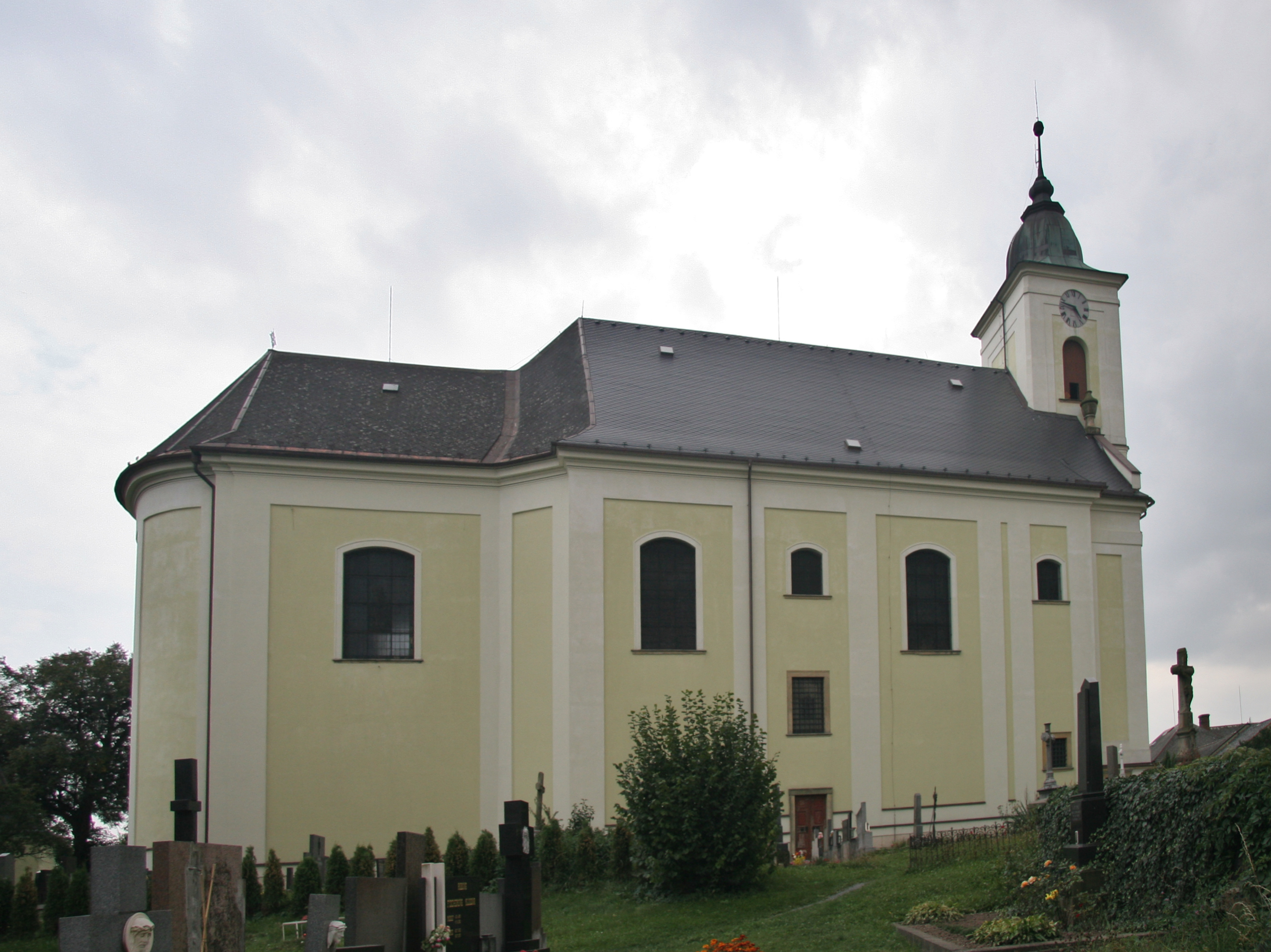
Church of Saint James the Great

The main landmarks of Městečko Trnávka are the ruin of the Cimburk Castle and the Church of Saint James the Great. The church is a late Baroque building from 1752.

Cimburk Castle was founded around 1300. In the 15th and 16th centuries, it was most likely rebuilt, fortified and expanded. It was destroyed in 1645 and became a ruin.

== Notable people ==
- Wenzel Müller (1767–1835), Austrian composer
- Franz Spina (1868–1938), Sudeten German politician
