= Moravičany =

- Municipality
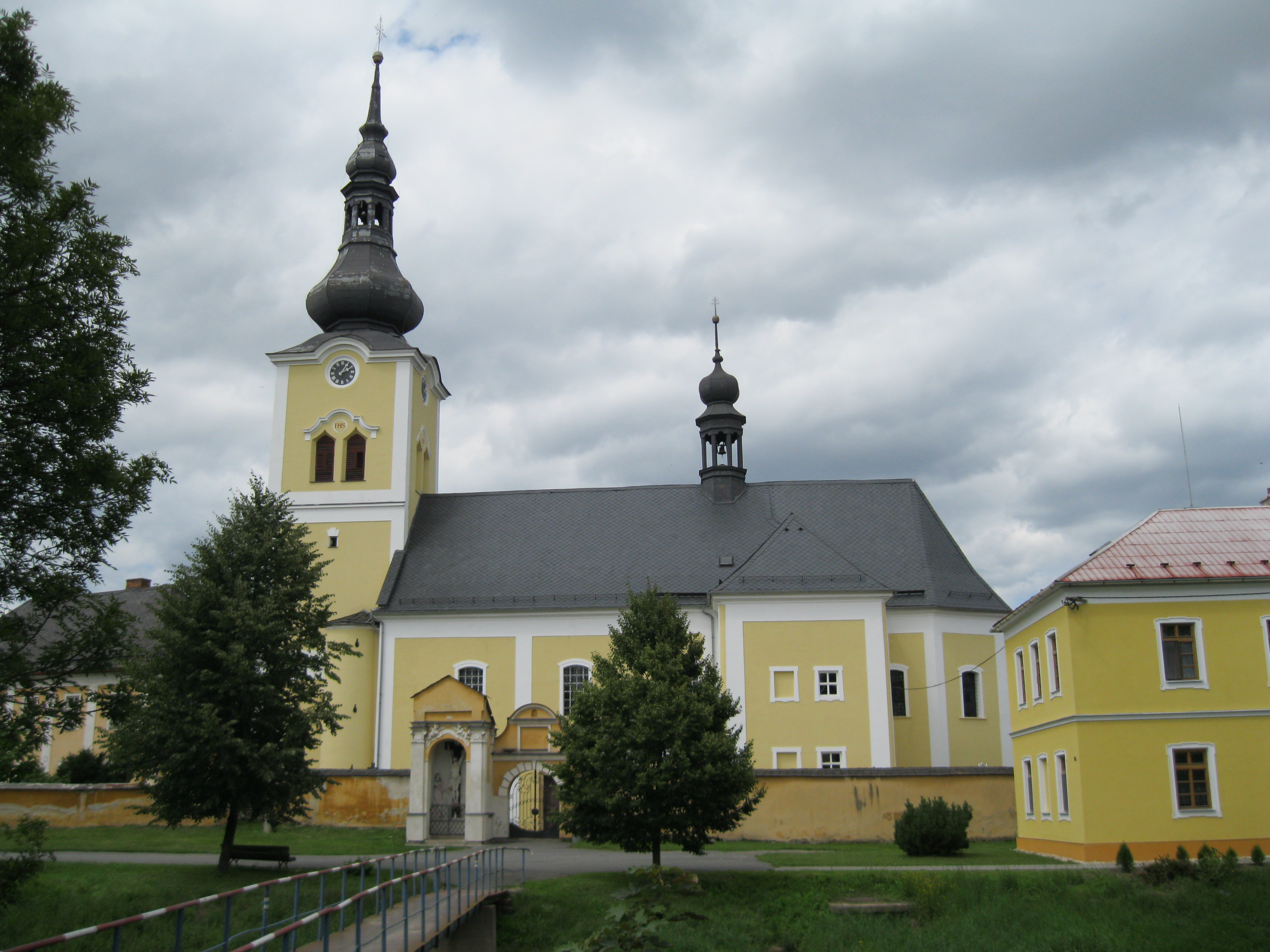
- Church of Saint George

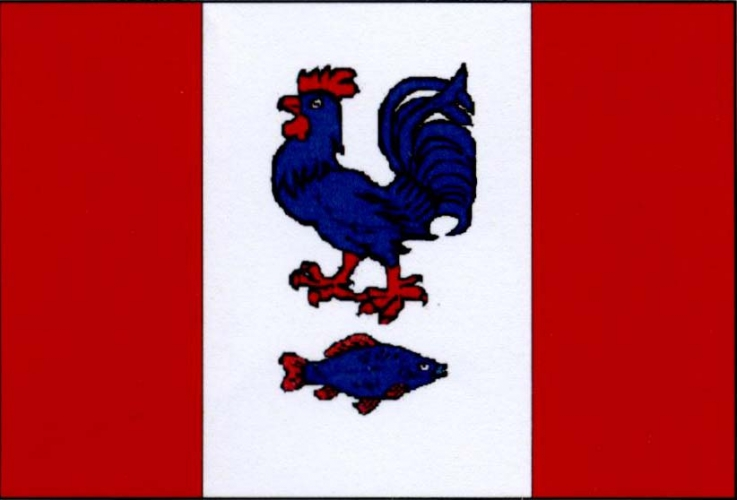
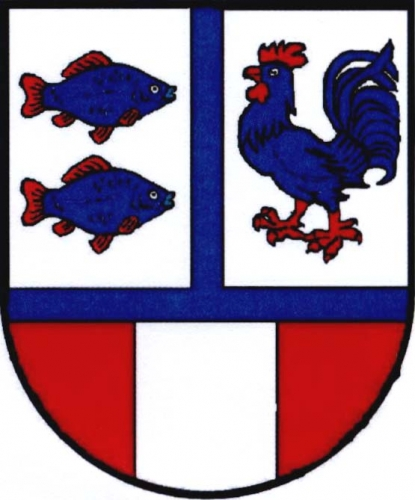
- Flag Coat of arms

- Location in the Czech Republic
- Coordinates: 49°45′25″N 16°57′38″E
- Country: Czech Republic
- Region: Olomouc
- District: Šumperk
- First mentioned: 1249

Area
  - Total: 12.15 km^{2} (4.69 sq mi)
- Elevation: 243 m (797 ft)

Population (2026-01-01)
  - Total: 1,385
  - Density: 114.0/km^{2} (295.2/sq mi)
- Time zone: UTC+1 (CET)
  - Summer (DST): UTC+2 (CEST)
- Postal code: 789 82
- Website: www.obec-moravicany.cz

Moravičany is a municipality and village in Šumperk District in the Olomouc Region of the Czech Republic. It has about 1,400 inhabitants.

== Administrative division ==
Moravičany consists of three municipal parts (in brackets population according to the 2021 census):

- Moravičany (1,045)
- Doubravice (138)
- Mitrovice (57)

== Geography ==
Moravičany is located about 23 kilometres (14 mi) south of Šumperk and 27 km (17 mi) northwest of Olomouc. It lies in the Mohelnice Depression. The municipality is situated on the right bank of the Morava River, at its confluence with the Třebůvka River.

Part of Lake Moravičanské jezero lies in the municipal territory. It is an artificial lake created by flooding a gravel quarry. With an area of 90 ha (220 acres), it is one of the largest bodies of water in the Olomouc Region.

== History ==
The first written mention of Moravičany is from 1249. It has been a typical agricultural village since its inception until now. The village burned down during the Thirty Years' War and then in 1860.

== Demographics ==
Historical population

Year	Pop.	±%
1869	1,280	—
1880	1,304	+1.9%
1890	1,246	−4.4%
1900	1,258	+1.0%
1910	1,336	+6.2%

Year	Pop.	±%
1921	1,356	+1.5%
1930	1,395	+2.9%
1950	1,167	−16.3%
1961	1,158	−0.8%
1970	1,156	−0.2%

Year	Pop.	±%
1980	1,178	+1.9%
1991	1,124	−4.6%
2001	1,192	+6.0%
2011	1,262	+5.9%
2021	1,240	−1.7%

Source: Censuses

== Transport ==
The D35 motorway (part of the European route E442) from Olomouc to the Hradec Králové Region passes along the western municipal border.

Moravičany is located on the railway line Nezamyslice–Kouty nad Desnou via Olomouc.

== Sights ==
The main landmark of Moravičany is the Church of Saint George. Existence of the church was first documented in the 14th century. It was rebuilt in 1615 and then in the second half of the 18th century, when a Baroque chapel was added.

== Notable people ==
- Anežka Hodinová-Spurná (1895–1963), politician
- Štěpánka Mertová (1930–2004), athlete
