= Sendraž =

Municipality in the Czech Republic

- Municipality
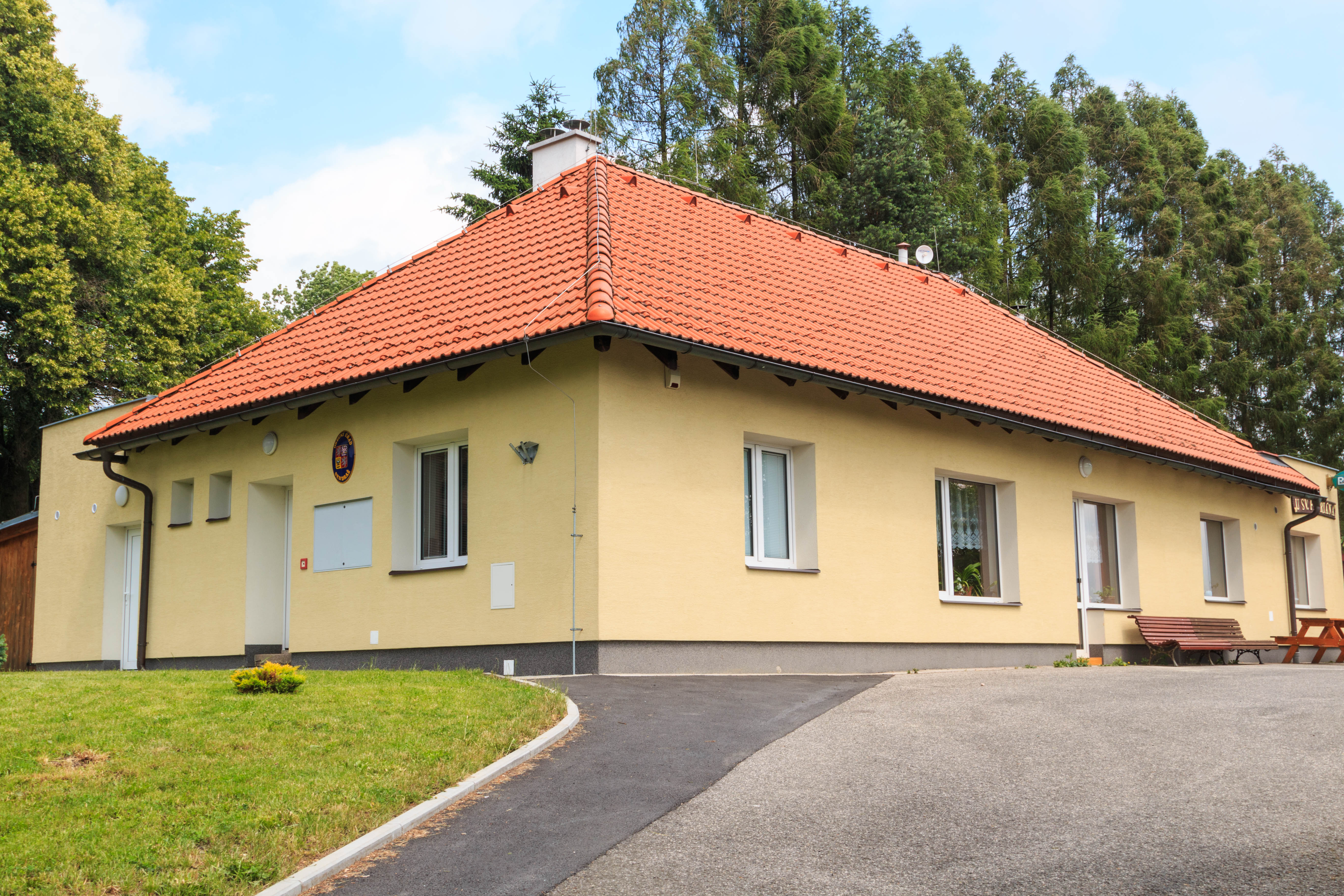
- Municipal office

- Location in the Czech Republic
- Coordinates: 50°22′4″N 16°12′8″E
- Country: Czech Republic
- Region: Hradec Králové
- District: Náchod
- First mentioned: 1338

Area
  - Total: 1.84 km^{2} (0.71 sq mi)
- Elevation: 550 m (1,800 ft)

Population (2026-01-01)
  - Total: 111
  - Density: 60.3/km^{2} (156/sq mi)
- Time zone: UTC+1 (CET)
  - Summer (DST): UTC+2 (CEST)
- Postal code: 549 01
- Website: sendraz.cz

Sendraž (German: Sendrasch) is a municipality and village in Náchod District in the Hradec Králové Region of the Czech Republic. It has about 100 inhabitants.

== Etymology ==
The initial name of the village was probably Sěmidraž and was derived from the personal name Sěmidrah, meaning "Sěmidrah's (court)".

== Geography ==
Sendraž is located about 5 kilometres (3 mi) south of Náchod and 31 km (19 mi) northeast of Hradec Králové. It lies in the Orlické Foothills. The highest point is the hill Na Vartě at 618 m (2,028 ft) above sea level.

== History ==
The first written mention of Sendraž is from 1338, when the village was almost entirely destroyed by fire. From 1548 until the establishment of an independent municipality in 1848, Sendraž belonged to the Náchod estate. From 1959 to 1990, Sendraž was a municipal part of Jestřebí.

== Demographics ==
Historical population

Year	Pop.	±%
1869	216	—
1880	202	−6.5%
1890	213	+5.4%
1900	205	−3.8%
1910	206	+0.5%

Year	Pop.	±%
1921	179	−13.1%
1930	149	−16.8%
1950	108	−27.5%
1961	113	+4.6%
1970	102	−9.7%

Year	Pop.	±%
1980	101	−1.0%
1991	84	−16.8%
2001	90	+7.1%
2011	95	+5.6%
2021	117	+23.2%

Source: Censuses

== Transport ==
There are no railways or major roads passing through the municipality.

== Sights ==
There are no protected cultural monuments in the municipality.

A tourist destination is the observation tower on the hill Na Vartě. From the 1920s to the 1950s, a wooden tower stood on the hill. In 2007–2009, a metal observation tower was built, which also serves as a telecommunications tower for a mobile operator. The tower is 50 m (164 ft) high and the observation deck is at a height of 28 m (92 ft).
