= Jan Bernášek =

Czech chess player

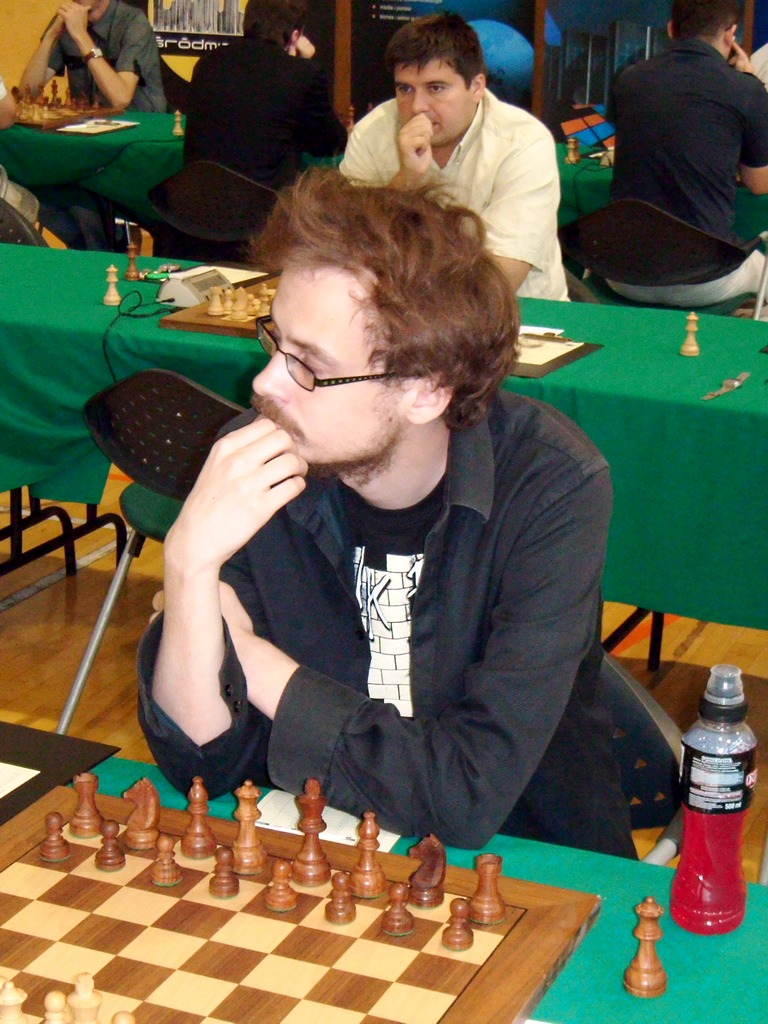
- Jan Bernasek in 2010

Personal information
- Born: May 31, 1986 (age 40) Moravská Třebová, Czechoslovakia

Chess career
- Country: Czech Republic
- Title: Grandmaster (2013)
- FIDE rating: 2471 (July 2026)
- Peak rating: 2551 (July 2013)

Jan Bernášek (born 31 May 1986 in Moravská Třebová, Czechoslovakia) is a Czech chess player. He achieved the title of a Grandmaster in 2013.

== Notable tournaments ==
Tournament Name	Year	ELO	Points
22nd European Club Cup	2006	2470	5.0
23rd Czech Open A Tournament	2012	2487	5.5
TCh-SVK 2019-20	2019	2490	7.0
TCh-CZE Extraliga	2019	2490	4.0
Sachy.cz Extraliga	2021	2498	5.0
TCh-CZE 1 Liga Zapad	2021	2498	6.5
