= Třebůvka =

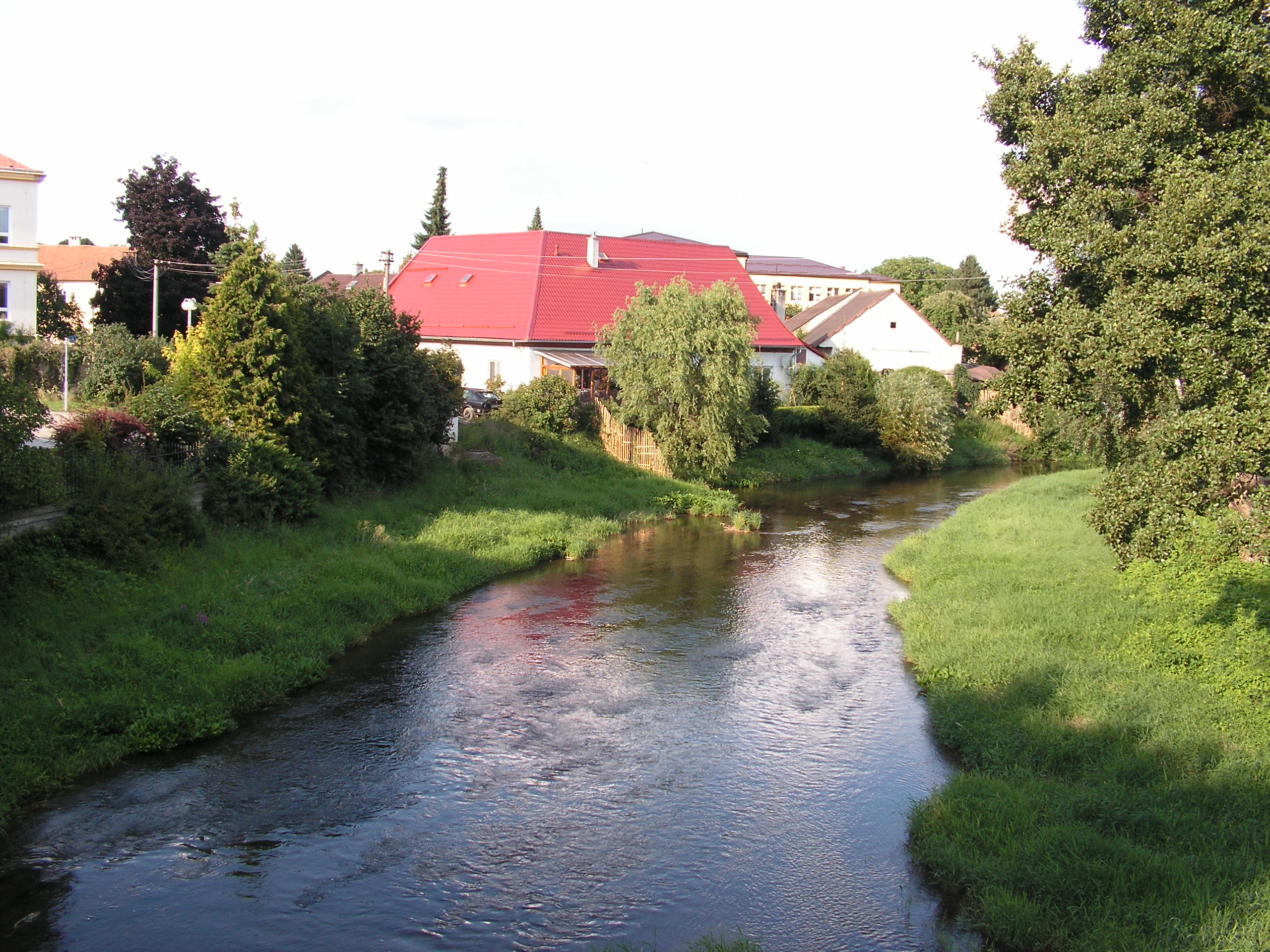
- The Třebůvka in Loštice

Location
- Country: Czech Republic
- Regions: Pardubice; Olomouc

Physical characteristics
- Source
  - location: Křenov, Orlické Foothills
  - coordinates: 49°40′59″N 16°38′56″E
  - elevation: 458 m (1,503 ft)
- Mouth
  - location: Morava
  - coordinates: 49°45′16″N 16°58′31″E
  - elevation: 260 m (850 ft)
- Length: 48.2 km (30.0 mi)
- Basin size: 579.8 km^{2} (223.9 sq mi)
- Discharge
  - average: 2.27 m^{3}/s (80 cu ft/s) near estuary

Basin features
- Progression: Morava→ Danube→ Black Sea

The Třebůvka is a river in the Czech Republic, a right tributary of the Morava River. It flows through the Pardubice and Olomouc regions. It is 48.2 km (30.0 mi) long.

== Etymology ==
The river was probably named after the town of Moravská Třebová. However, there is also the possibility that the name of the river originated from the verb tříbit ('chop down', 'clear'), meaning "a river flowing through a place created by chopping down a forest", and the name of the town was derived from the river.

== Characteristic ==
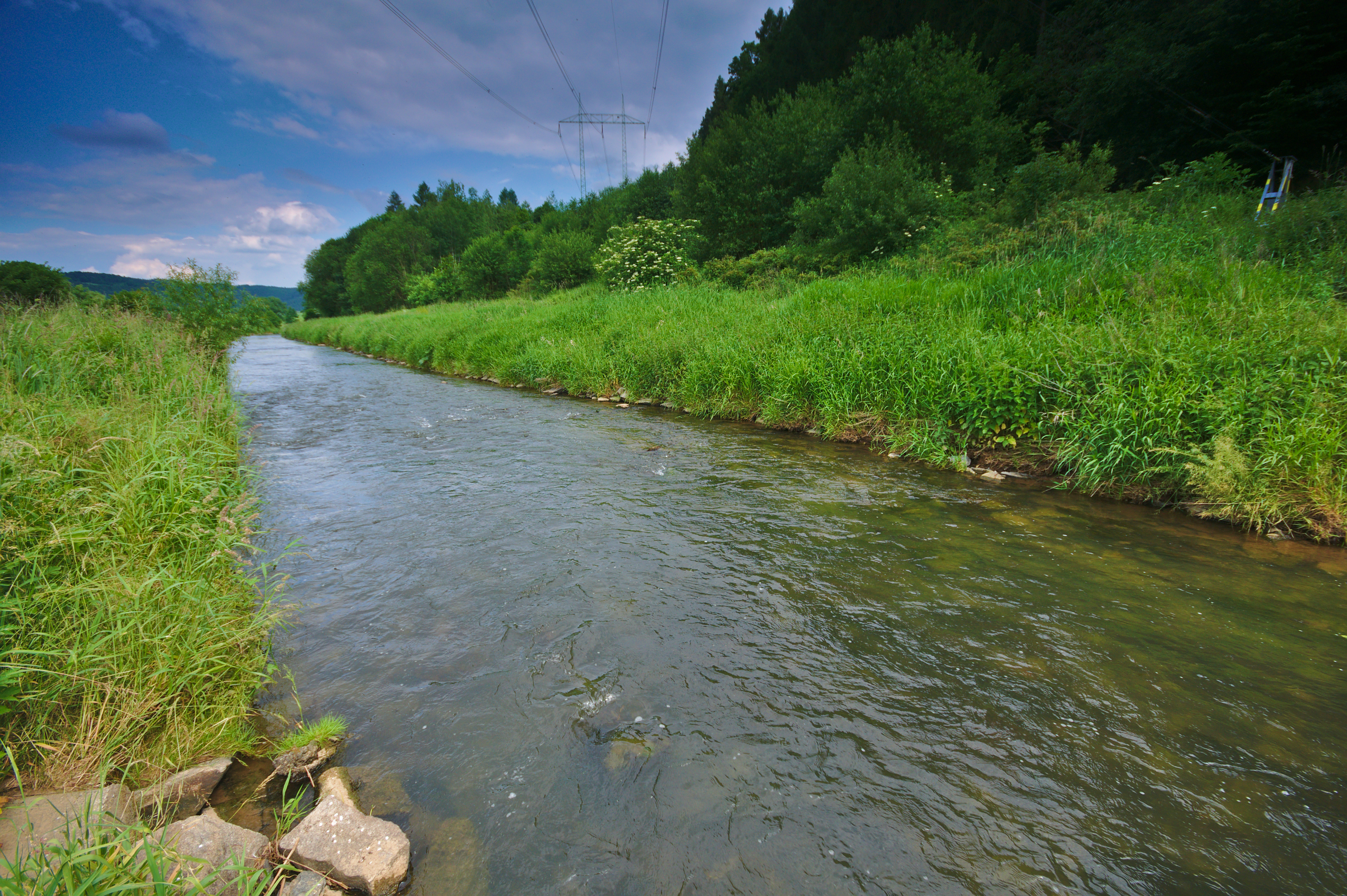
The Třebůvka near Vranová Lhota

The Třebůvka originates in the territory of Křenov in the Orlické Foothills at an elevation of 458 m (1,503 ft) and flows to Moravičany, where it enters the Morava River at an elevation of 260 m (850 ft). It is 48.2 km (30.0 mi) long. Its drainage basin has an area of 579.8 km^{2} (223.9 sq mi). The average discharge at its mouth is 2.27 m3/s.

The longest tributaries of the Třebůvka are:

Tributary	Length (km)	Side
Jevíčka	23.1	right
Javoříčka	11.7	right
Podhrádek	10.7	left

== Course ==
The most notable settlement on the river is the town of Moravská Třebová. The river flows through the municipal territories of Křenov, Dlouhá Loučka, Útěchov, Moravská Třebová, Linhartice, Gruna, Radkov, Rozstání, Městečko Trnávka, Vranová Lhota, Bouzov, Loštice and Moravičany.

== Bodies of water ==
There are 229 bodies of water in the basin area. The largest of them is Moravská Třebová Reservoir with an area of 11.9 ha (29 acres), built on the Třebůvka.

== Fauna ==
The upper course of the Třebůvka is home to the schneider, which is an endangered species of fish within the Czech Republic.

== Tourism ==
The Třebůvka is suitable for river tourism. About 25 km (16 mi) of the river is navigable, but only in spring or after heavy rains.

== See also ==
- List of rivers of the Czech Republic
