= Eastern Sudetes =

Eastern part of the Sudetes mountains on the border of the Czech Republic and Poland

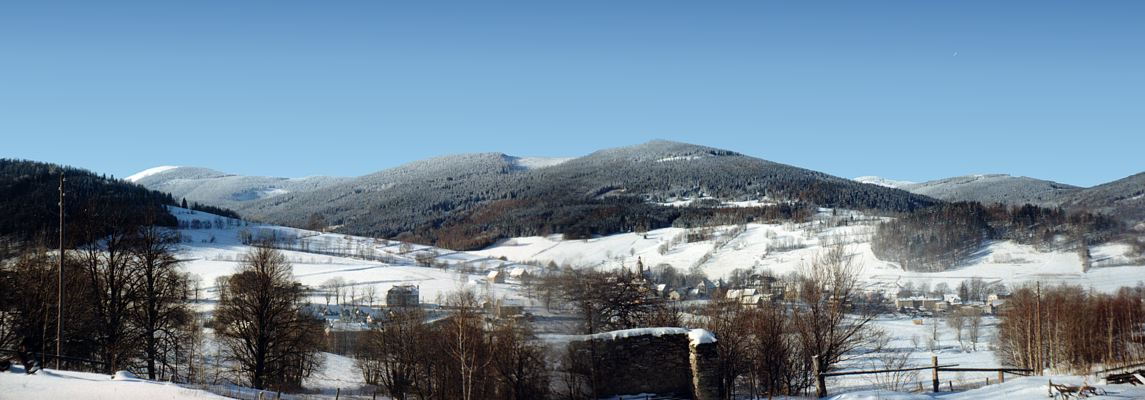
- Panorama of Śnieżnik Mountains

Highest point
- Peak: Praděd
- Elevation: 1,491 m (4,892 ft)
- Coordinates: 50°4′59″N 17°13′51″E

Geography
- Divisions of the Sudetes range system, Eastern Sudetes marked in green
- Countries: Czech Republic and Poland
- Regions: Olomouc, Moravian-Silesian (Czech Rep.) and Lower Silesian, Opole, Silesian (Poland)
- Parent range: Sudetes

The Eastern Sudetes (Polish: Sudety Wschodnie, Czech: Východní Sudety or Jesenická oblast) are the eastern part of the Sudetes mountains on the border of the Czech Republic and Poland. They stretch from the Kłodzko Valley and the Eastern Neisse River in the west down to the Moravian Gate in the east, leading to the Outer Western Carpathians.

== Subdivision ==
The Eastern Sudetes consist of geomorphological units:

- Golden Mountains
- Králický Sněžník Mountains
- Opawskie Mountains / Zlatohorská Highlands
- Hrubý Jeseník
- Hanušovice Highlands
- Mohelnice Depression
- Zábřeh Highlands
- Nízký Jeseník

== Notable towns ==
Notable towns in this area include:

- Prudnik (Poland)
- Jeseník (Czech Republic)
- Bruntál (Czech Republic)
- Krnov (Czech Republic)
- Šumperk (Czech Republic)
- Zábřeh (Czech Republic)
