= Mohelnice Depression =

Depression in the Czech Republic

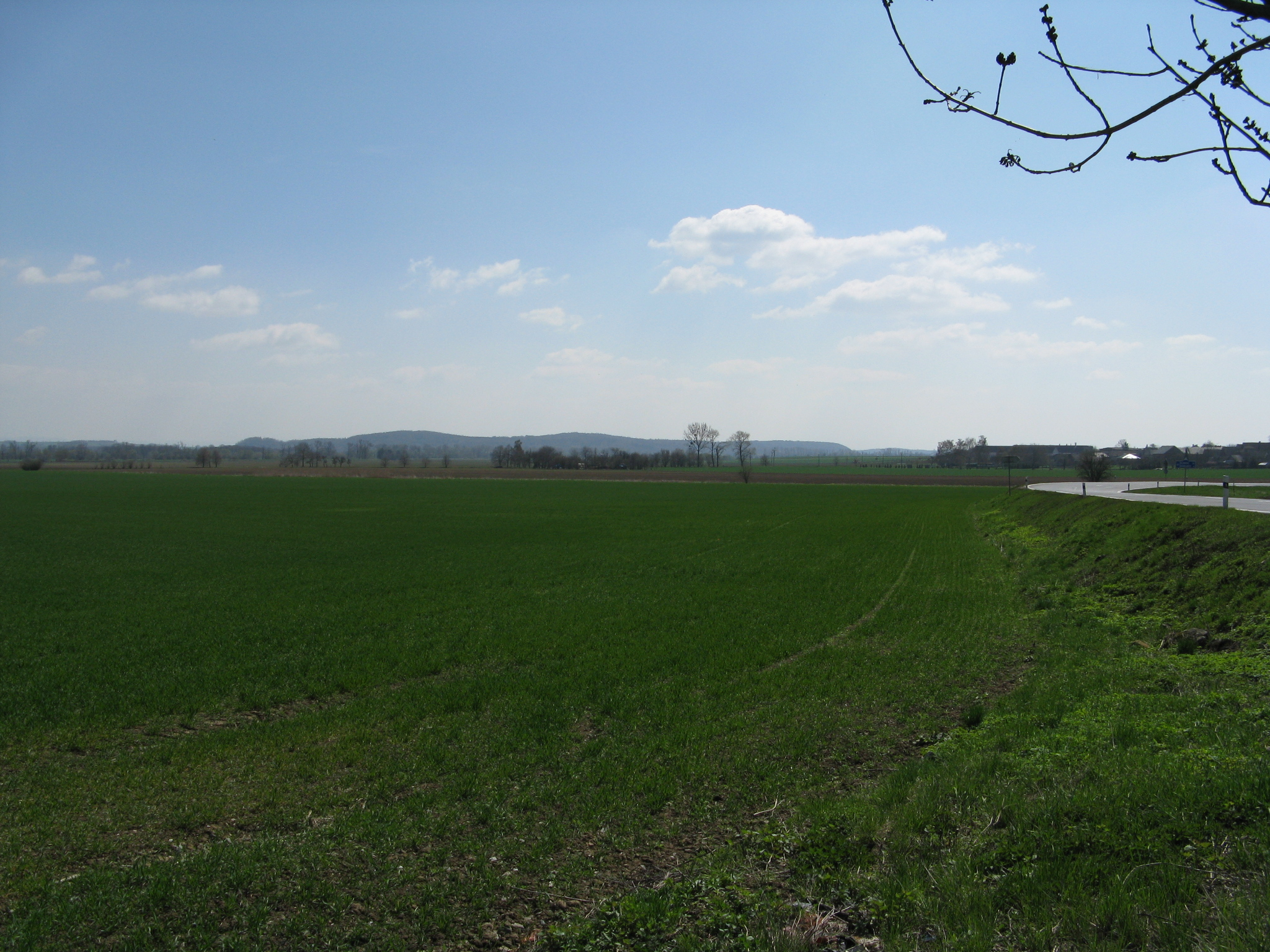
- Southern part of the Mohelnice Depression

Highest point
- Peak: Homůlka
- Elevation: 333 m (1,093 ft)

Dimensions
- Length: 30 km (19 mi)
- Area: 119 km^{2} (46 mi^{2})

Geography
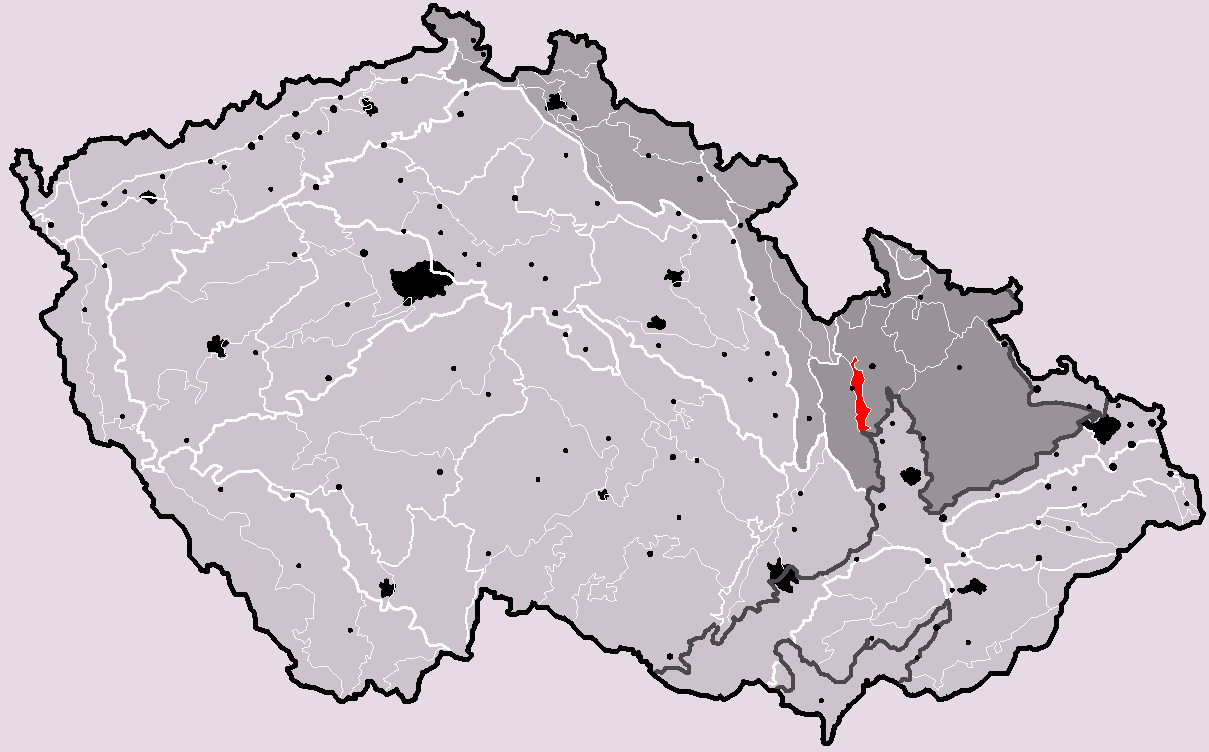
- Mohelnice Depression in the geomorphological system of the Czech Republic
- Country: Czech Republic
- Region: Olomouc
- Range coordinates: 49°50′N 16°56′E
- Parent range: Eastern Sudetes

The Mohelnice Depression (Czech: Mohelnická brázda) is a depression and a geomorphological mesoregion of the Czech Republic. It is located in the Olomouc Region. It forms part of the Eastern Sudetes and represents a lowland corridor along the Morava River, separating the surrounding highlands of the region. The depression is named after the town of Mohelnice.

== Geomorphology ==
The Mohelnice Depression is a mesoregion of the Eastern Sudetes within the Bohemian Massif. The depression separates the Hanušovice Highlands to the east and the Zábřeh Highlands to the west. It has the character of a plain, mostly at an altitude of 240–260 m. The highest elevation of the depression is the hill Homůlka with an elevation of 333 m (1,093 ft).

== Geography ==
The Mohelnice Depression has an area of 119 km^{2} (46 sq mi) (making it one of the smallest natural mesoregions in the Czech Republic) and an average elevation of 289 m (948 ft). It is almost 30 km (19 mi) long and 3–5 km wide.

The Morava River forms the axis of the Mohelnice Depression. Notable Morava's tributaries in the territory include the Třebůvka, Moravská Sázava and Desná. In the southern part of the Mohelnice Depression, near the Morava River, gravel and sand were previously mined. The flooding of quarries created several artificial lakes, the largest of which is Moravičanské jezero. It has an area of 108 ha (270 acres).

The most populated towns, located mostly in the territory, are Zábřeh and Mohelnice.

== Nature ==
The landscape is predominantly agricultural and includes only a minimum of forested land. The depression is part of the informally defined region of Haná, which is the most fertile part of the Czech Republic.

A small part of the protected landscape area of Litovelské Pomoraví extends into the Mohelnice Depression in the south.
