= Hanušovice Highlands =

Highland region in the Eastern Sudetes (Czech Republic)

Coordinates: 49°58′59.51″N 16°59′21.55″E

- Czech: Hanušovická vrchovina; Polish: Wysoczyzna Hanuszowicka; German: Hannsdorfer Bergland
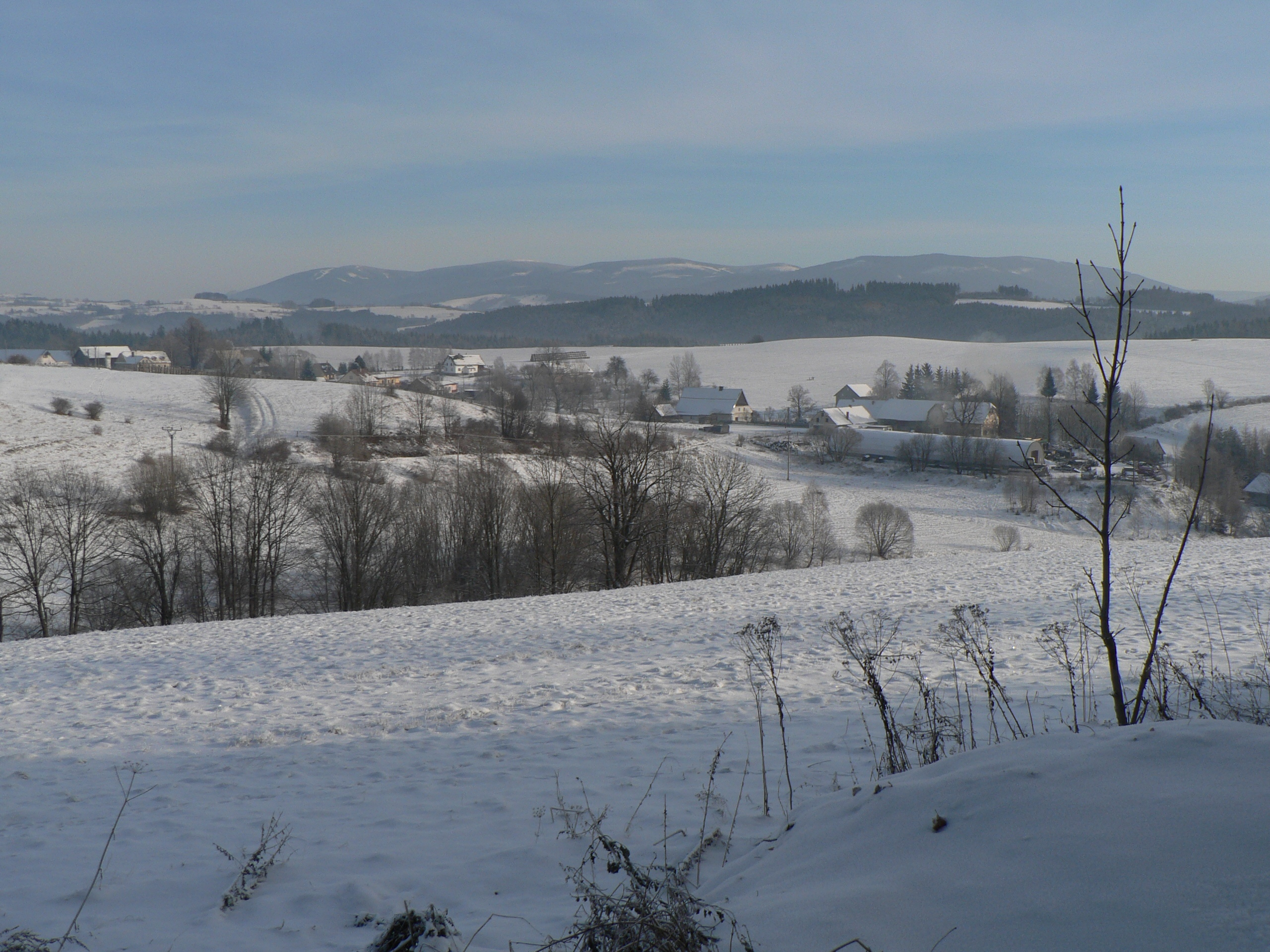
- View of the Hanušovice Highlands

Highest point
- Peak: Jeřáb
- Elevation: 1,003 m (3,291 ft)

Dimensions
- Area: 793 km^{2} (306 mi^{2})

Geography
- Country: Czech Republic
- Parent range: Sudetes

The Hanušovice Highlands (Czech: Hanušovická vrchovina) are a geomorphological mesoregion of the Eastern Sudetes in the northeastern part of the Czech Republic, named after the town of Hanušovice.

== Geography ==
The Hanušovice Highlands lie amid the following sub-ranges of the Sudetes: to the northeast the Hrubý Jeseník, to the southeast the Nízký Jeseník, to the southwest the Mohelnice Depression, to the west the Kłodzko Valley, to the northwest the Králický Sněžník Mountains, and to the north the Golden Mountains. The highlands lie mainly in the Olomouc Region, with a smaller part extending into the Pardubice Region.

The mesoregion has an area of about 793 km^{2} and an average elevation of 527.2 m. Its highest summit is Jeřáb (1003 m).

== Geology ==
The broader region (including the Hanušovice Highlands and adjacent units of the Jeseníky area) is characterized by a complex geological history and widespread metamorphic basement rocks (crystalline rocks).

In regional syntheses for the Olomouc Region, the Hanušovice Highlands are described as being composed largely of crystalline schists and Paleozoic sediments, with Jeřáb as the highest peak.
