= Křenov =

- Municipality
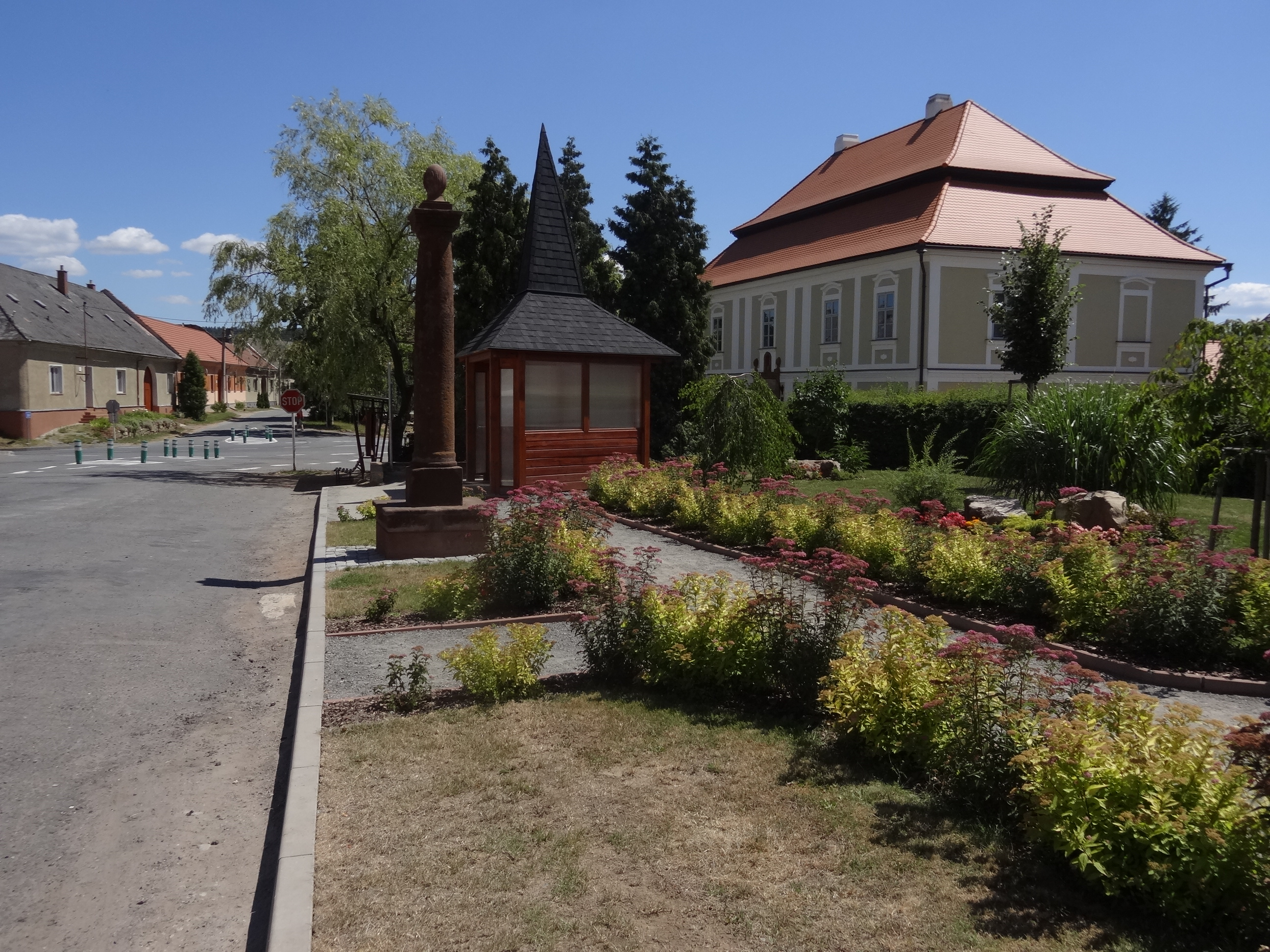
- Centre of Křenov

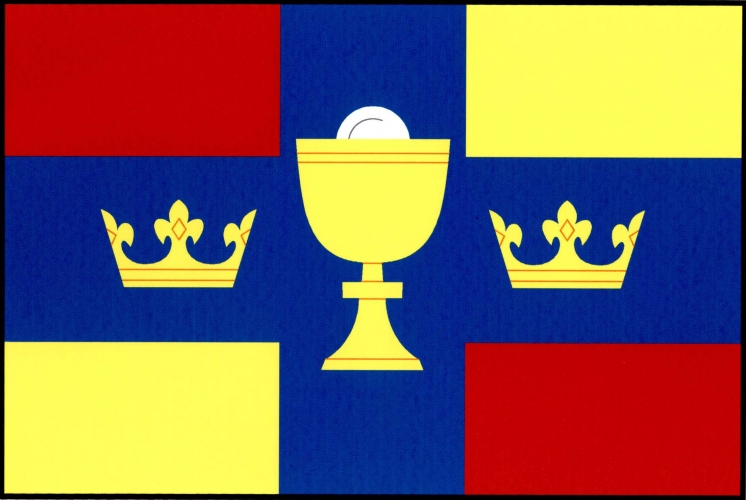
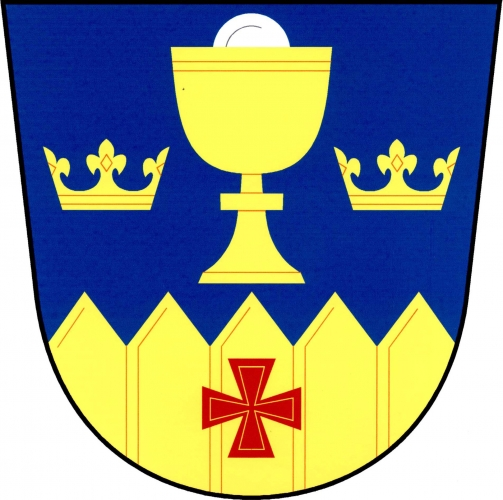
- Flag Coat of arms

- Location in the Czech Republic
- Coordinates: 49°40′47″N 16°37′44″E
- Country: Czech Republic
- Region: Pardubice
- District: Svitavy
- First mentioned: 1365

Area
  - Total: 10.46 km^{2} (4.04 sq mi)
- Elevation: 476 m (1,562 ft)

Population (2026-01-01)
  - Total: 393
  - Density: 37.6/km^{2} (97.3/sq mi)
- Time zone: UTC+1 (CET)
  - Summer (DST): UTC+2 (CEST)
- Postal code: 569 22
- Website: www.obeckrenov.cz

Křenov is a municipality and village in Svitavy District in the Pardubice Region of the Czech Republic. It has about 400 inhabitants.

Křenov lies approximately 14 kilometres (9 mi) south-east of Svitavy, 72 km (45 mi) south-east of Pardubice, and 164 km (102 mi) east of Prague. The Třebůvka River originates in the municipality.

== Demographics ==
Historical population
Year	Pop.	±%
1869	899	—
1880	950	+5.7%
1890	937	−1.4%
1900	933	−0.4%
1910	894	−4.2%
1921	741	−17.1%
1930	638	−13.9%
1950	381	−40.3%
1961	434	+13.9%
1970	422	−2.8%
1980	407	−3.6%
1991	464	+14.0%
2001	426	−8.2%
2011	388	−8.9%
2021	384	−1.0%
Source: Censuses
