= Linhartice =

- Municipality
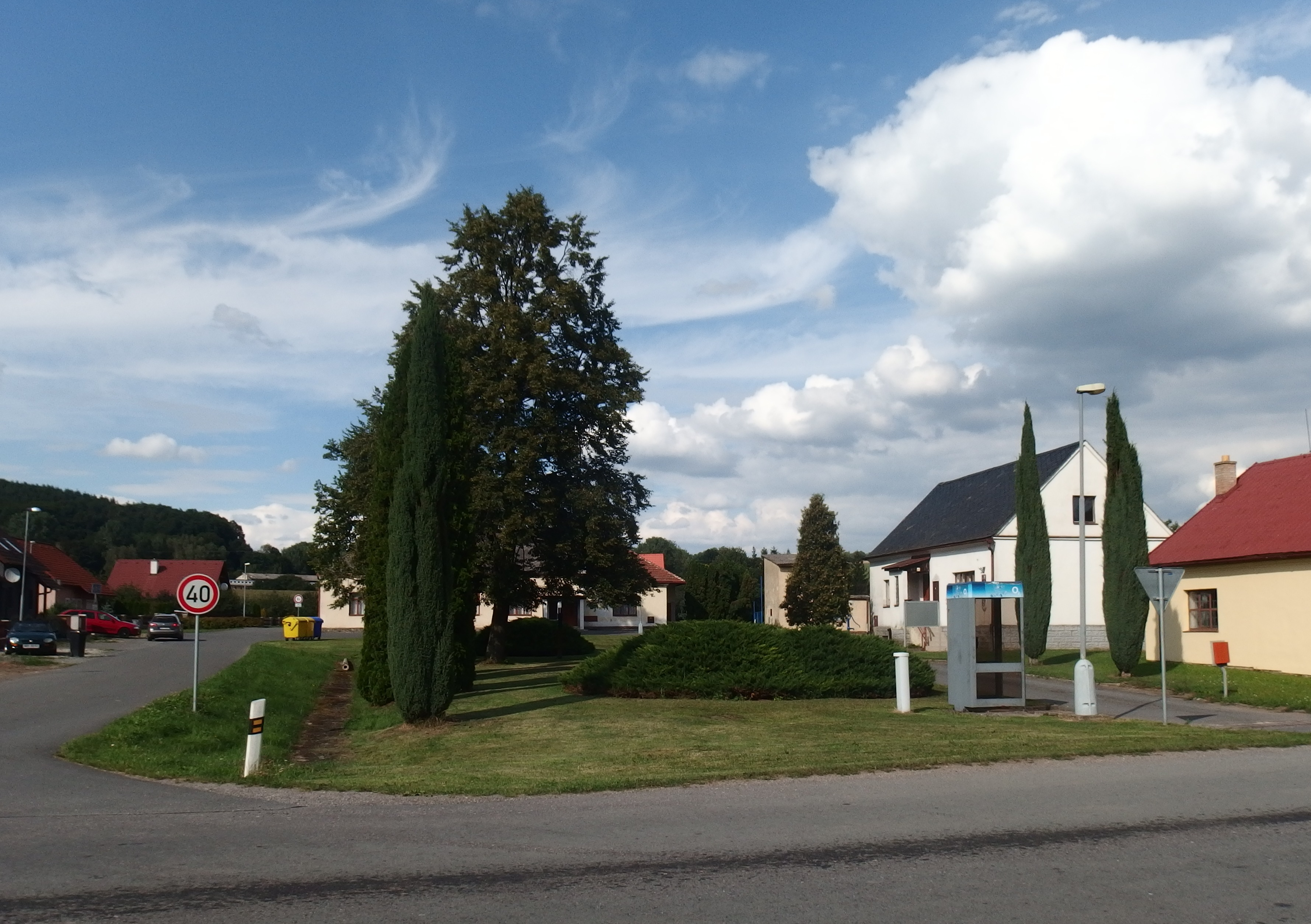
- Centre of Linhartice

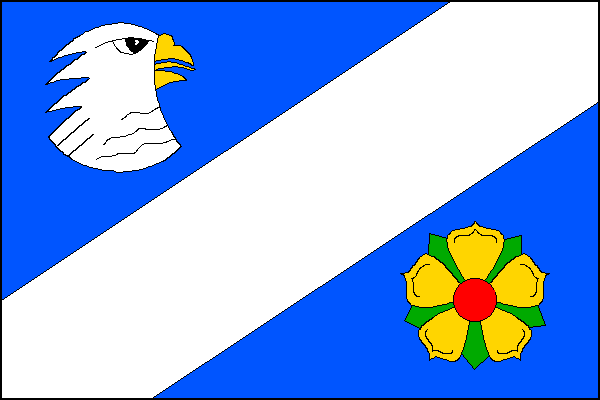
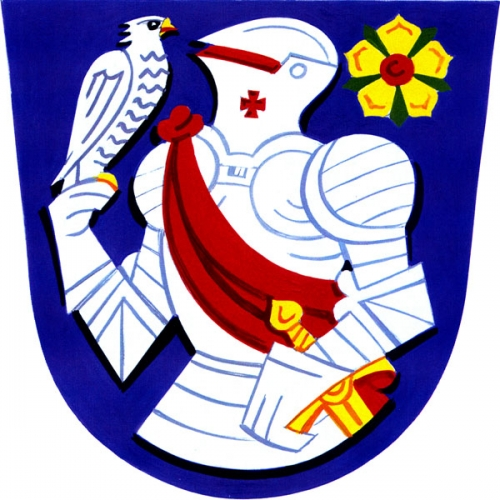
- Flag Coat of arms

- Location in the Czech Republic
- Coordinates: 49°45′26″N 16°41′43″E
- Country: Czech Republic
- Region: Pardubice
- District: Svitavy
- First mentioned: 1365

Area
  - Total: 8.75 km^{2} (3.38 sq mi)
- Elevation: 336 m (1,102 ft)

Population (2026-01-01)
  - Total: 623
  - Density: 71.2/km^{2} (184/sq mi)
- Time zone: UTC+1 (CET)
  - Summer (DST): UTC+2 (CEST)
- Postal code: 571 01
- Website: www.linhartice.cz

Linhartice (German: Ranigsdorf) is a municipality and village in Svitavy District in the Pardubice Region of the Czech Republic. It has about 600 inhabitants.

Linhartice lies approximately 17 kilometres (11 mi) east of Svitavy, 73 km (45 mi) south-east of Pardubice, and 168 km (104 mi) east of Prague.

== Demographics ==
Historical population
Year	Pop.	±%
1869	773	—
1880	883	+14.2%
1890	909	+2.9%
1900	846	−6.9%
1910	820	−3.1%
1921	748	−8.8%
1930	710	−5.1%
1950	575	−19.0%
1961	606	+5.4%
1970	575	−5.1%
1980	589	+2.4%
1991	588	−0.2%
2001	602	+2.4%
2011	624	+3.7%
2021	590	−5.4%
Source: Censuses
