= Vranová Lhota =

- Municipality
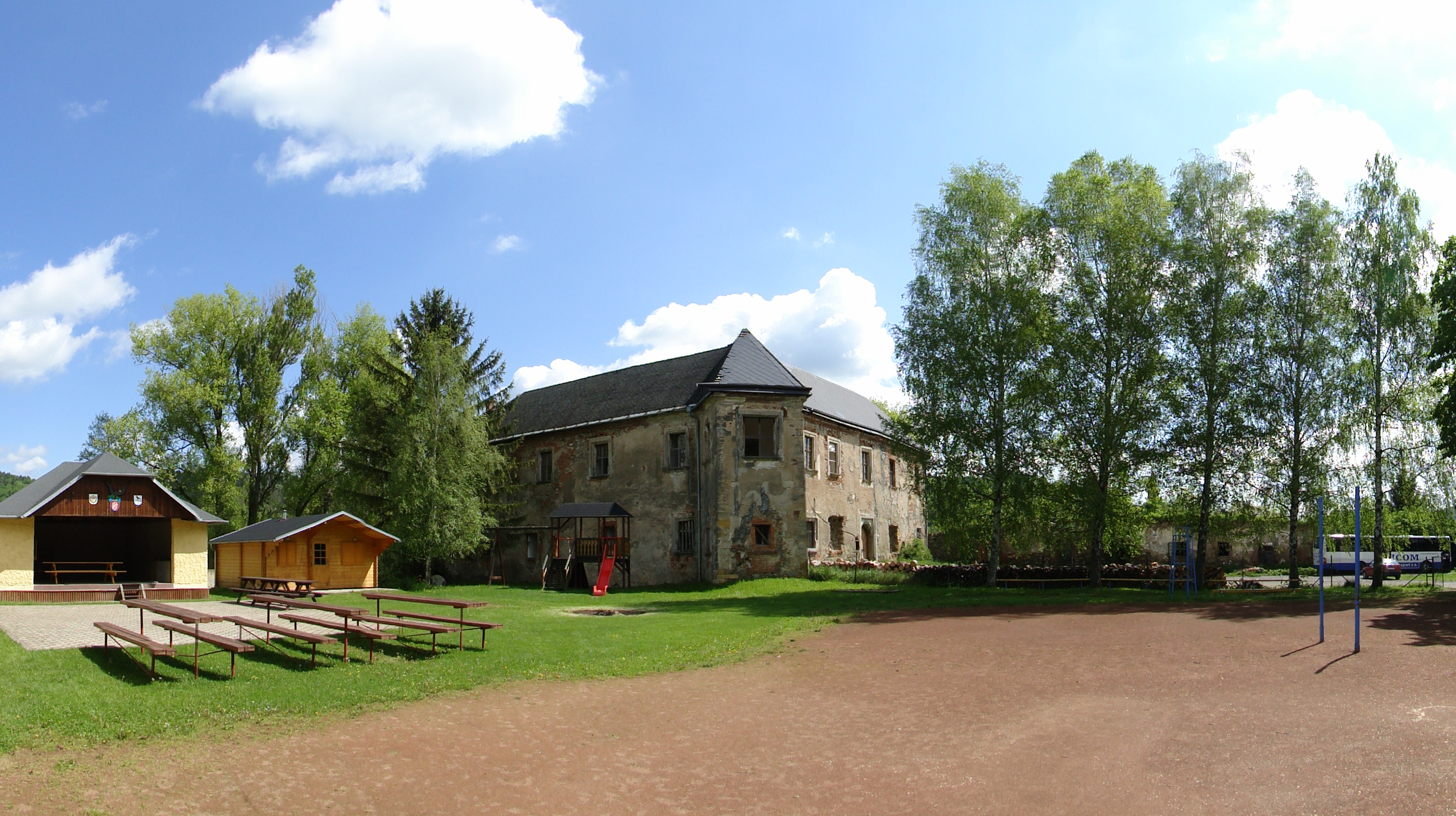
- Vranová Lhota Fort

- Flag Coat of arms

- Location in the Czech Republic
- Coordinates: 49°42′38″N 16°49′31″E
- Country: Czech Republic
- Region: Pardubice
- District: Svitavy
- First mentioned: 1258

Area
  - Total: 14.07 km^{2} (5.43 sq mi)
- Elevation: 292 m (958 ft)

Population (2026-01-01)
  - Total: 427
  - Density: 30.3/km^{2} (78.6/sq mi)
- Time zone: UTC+1 (CET)
  - Summer (DST): UTC+2 (CEST)
- Postal code: 571 01
- Website: www.vranovalhota.cz

Vranová Lhota is a municipality and village in Svitavy District in the Pardubice Region of the Czech Republic. It has about 400 inhabitants.

Vranová Lhota lies approximately 26 kilometres (16 mi) east of Svitavy, 83 km (52 mi) south-east of Pardubice, and 177 km (110 mi) east of Prague.

== Demographics ==
Historical population
Year	Pop.	±%
1869	939	—
1880	894	−4.8%
1890	831	−7.0%
1900	824	−0.8%
1910	809	−1.8%
1921	739	−8.7%
1930	781	+5.7%
1950	594	−23.9%
1961	571	−3.9%
1970	536	−6.1%
1980	467	−12.9%
1991	501	+7.3%
2001	512	+2.2%
2011	449	−12.3%
2021	425	−5.3%
Source: Censuses
