= Mesoregion (geomorphology) =

In some geomorphological taxonomies, a mesoregion is a natural region of intermediate size.

Mesoregions may be defined on the basis of morpholithogenic conditions and spatial connection. A mesoregion is used in the regionalization of the area, it is a physical and geographic division unit, it is part of a macroregion, and consists of microregions.

== See also ==
- Geomorphological division of Slovakia
- Geomorphological division of the Czech Republic
