= Moravská Třebová =

- Town
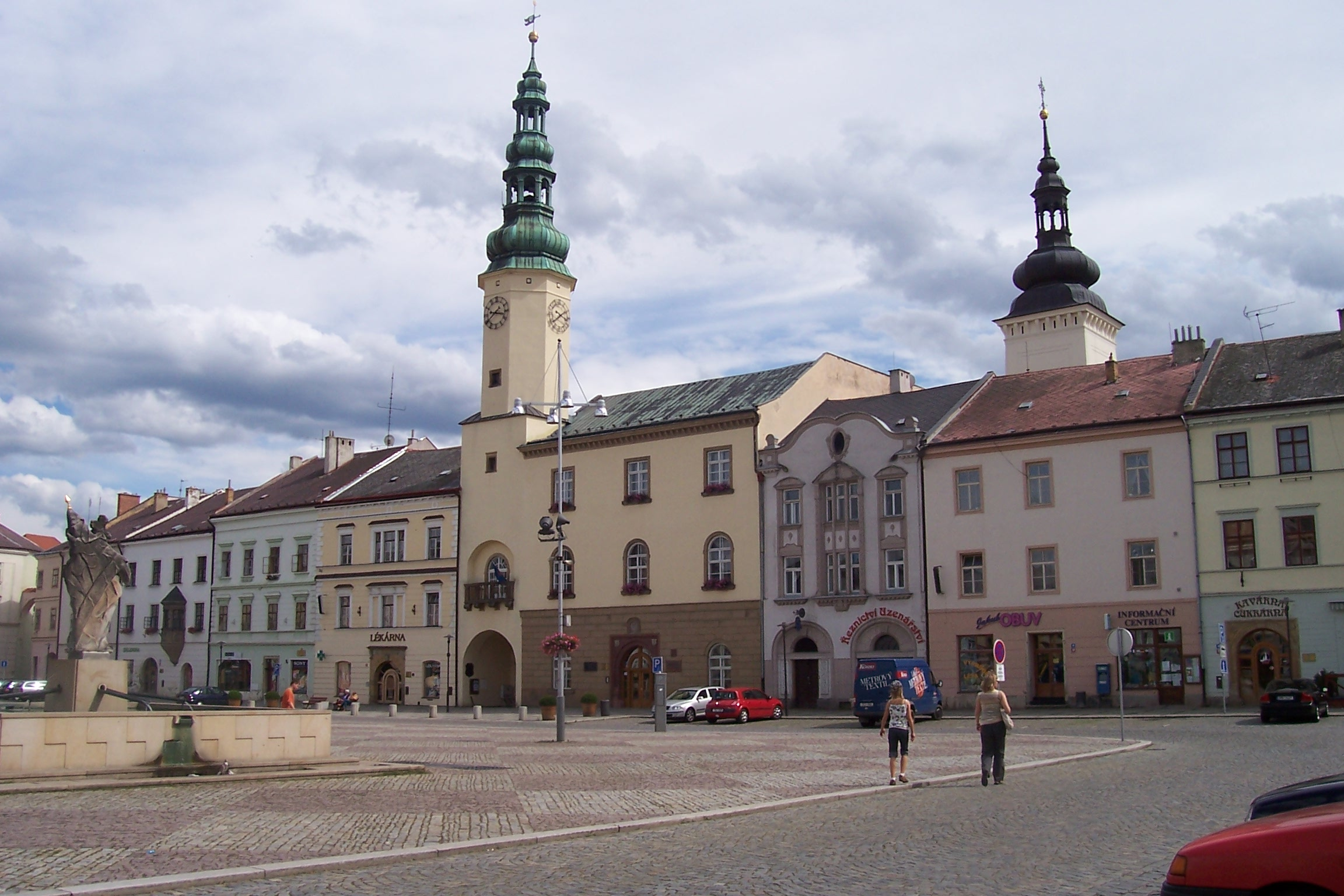
- Main town square with the town hall

- Flag Coat of arms

- Location in the Czech Republic
- Coordinates: 49°45′29″N 16°39′51″E
- Country: Czech Republic
- Region: Pardubice
- District: Svitavy
- First mentioned: 1270

Government
  - Mayor: Václav Dokoupil

Area
  - Total: 42.05 km^{2} (16.24 sq mi)
- Elevation: 360 m (1,180 ft)

Population (2026-01-01)
  - Total: 9,418
  - Density: 224.0/km^{2} (580.1/sq mi)
- Time zone: UTC+1 (CET)
  - Summer (DST): UTC+2 (CEST)
- Postal code: 571 01
- Website: www.moravskatrebova.cz

Moravská Třebová (Czech pronunciation: [ˈmorafskaː ˈtr̝̊ɛbovaː]; German: Mährisch Trübau) is a town in Svitavy District in the Pardubice Region of the Czech Republic. It has about 9,400 inhabitants. The town is located on the Třebůvka River, on the border between the Orlické Foothills and Svitavy Uplands.

Moravská Třebová was founded around 1257. The historic town centre is well preserved and is protected as an urban monument reservation. The main landmark of Moravská Třebová is the Moravská Třebová Castle, which is one of the oldest Renaissance buildings in the Czech Republic and is protected as a national cultural monument.

== Administrative division ==
Moravská Třebová consists of five municipal parts (in brackets population according to the 2021 census):

- Město (1,064)
- Předměstí (7,149)
- Boršov (645)
- Sušice (507)
- Udánky (262)

== Geography ==
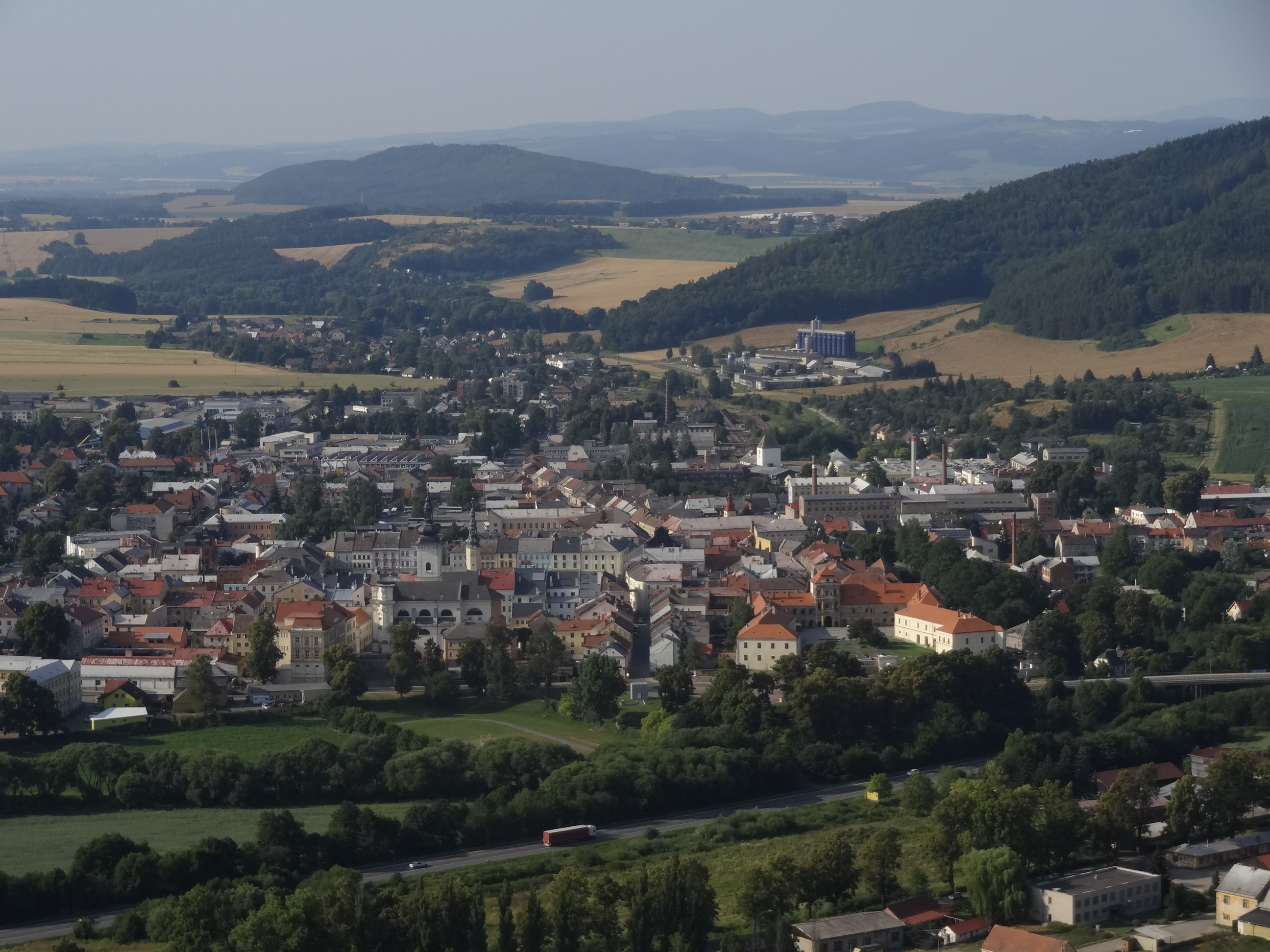
General view of the town centre

Moravská Třebová is located about 14 kilometres (9 mi) east of Svitavy and 60 km (37 mi) north of Brno. It lies mostly in the Orlické Foothills. The westernmost part of the municipal territory extends into the Svitavy Uplands and includes the Rohová National Nature Reserve. In the nature reserve is located the highest point of Moravská Třebová, the hill Roh at 660 m (2,170 ft) above sea level.

The town is situated on the Třebůvka River, which supplies the fishpond Moravská Třebová on the southern outskirts of the town.

== History ==
Moravská Třebová was founded around 1257 by Boreš of Rýzmburk as a typical colonisation town. The greatest boom occurred during the rule of the Lords of Boskovice and Ladislav Velen of Zierotin between 1486 and 1622, when the town was the centre of humanistic scholarship and earned the nickname "Moravian Athens".

In 1840 and 1844, the town was severely damaged by fires, which destroyed part of the castle and Renaissance façades of the houses.

Moravská Třebová was located in the largest German linguistic enclave within Bohemia and Moravia. Until the expulsion of Germans in 1945 according to the Beneš decrees and Potsdam Agreement, it was mainly inhabited by German-speaking population.

During the German occupation in World War II, the occupiers operated the Oflag VIII-F prisoner-of-war camp for Allied officers and E391 forced labour subcamp of the Stalag VIII-B/344 POW camp in the town.

The town was largely shaped by the textile industry. However, most factories eventually went bankrupt.

Between 1850 and 1960, Moravská Třebová was a district town.

== Demographics ==
Historical population

Year	Pop.	±%
1869	7,660	—
1880	8,731	+14.0%
1890	10,321	+18.2%
1900	10,654	+3.2%
1910	10,308	−3.2%

Year	Pop.	±%
1921	9,149	−11.2%
1930	10,732	+17.3%
1950	7,956	−25.9%
1961	9,199	+15.6%
1970	9,892	+7.5%

Year	Pop.	±%
1980	10,966	+10.9%
1991	11,668	+6.4%
2001	11,586	−0.7%
2011	10,542	−9.0%
2021	9,627	−8.7%

Source: Censuses

== Economy ==
The largest employer based in the town is ATEK, a manufacturer of plastic and rubber parts (especially for the automotive industry) with more than 250 employees.

== Transport ==
The I/35 road (part of the European route E442) runs through the town. It replaces the unfinished section of the D35 motorway from Olomouc to the Hradec Králové Region.

Moravská Třebová is the starting point of the railway line of local importance heading to Česká Třebová.

== Sights ==
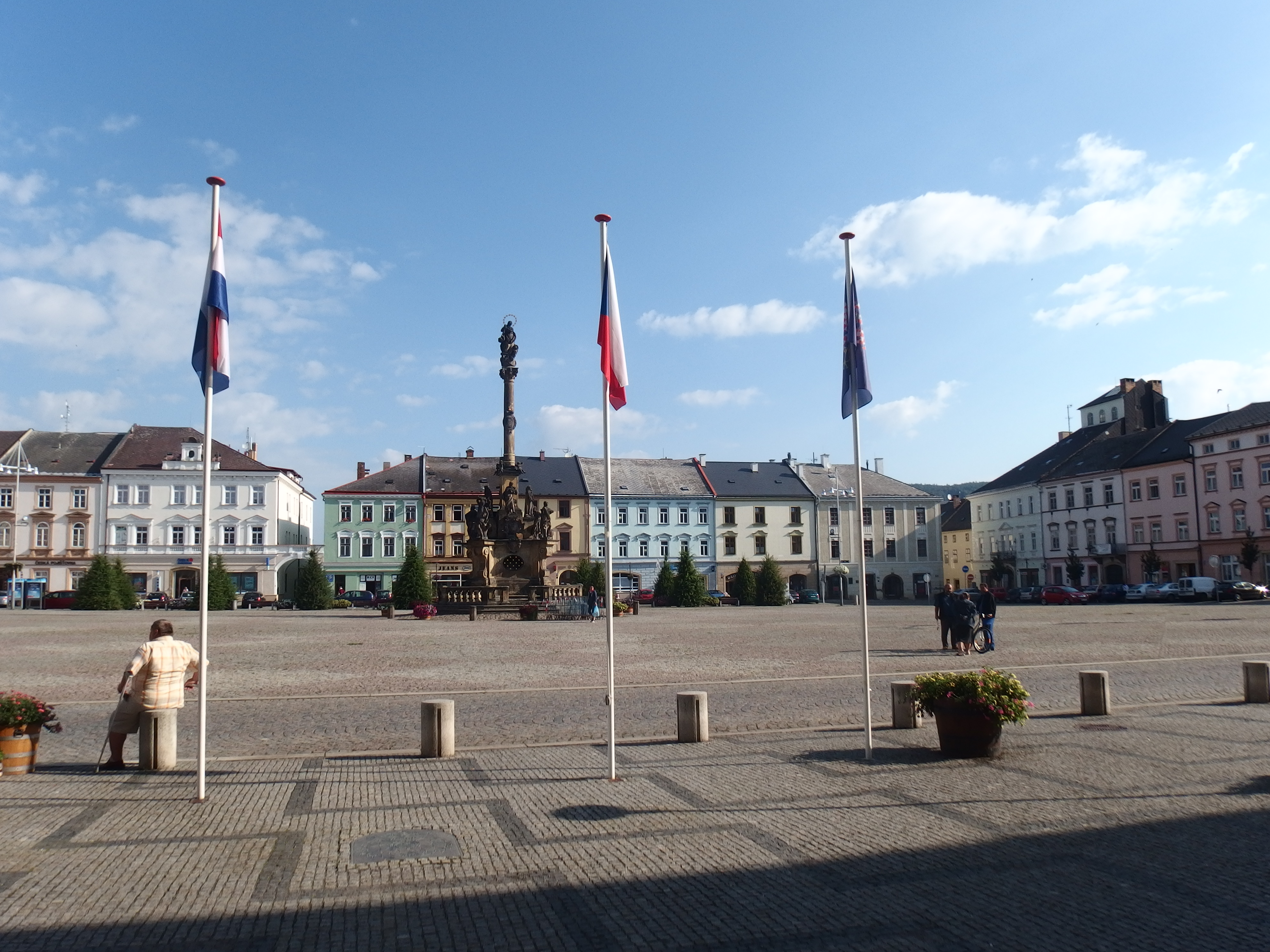
Northern part of the square with the plague column

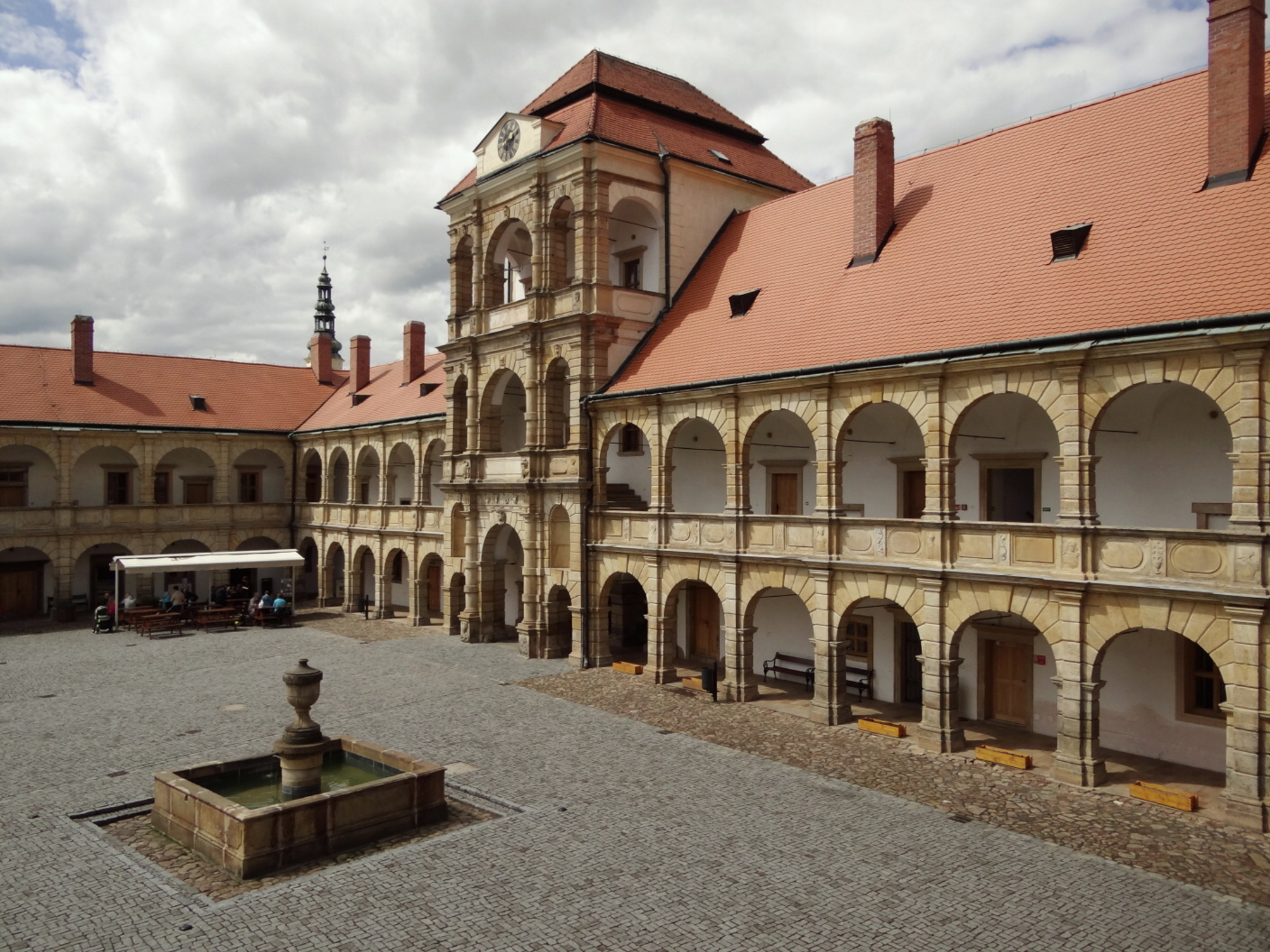
Moravská Třebová Castle

The main landmark is the Moravská Třebová Castle. The original castle from the 13th century was reconstructed in the early Renaissance style in the late 15th century. In 1611–1618, it was expanded with an arcade wing. The castle is one of the oldest Renaissance monuments in the country. Since 2026, it has been protected as a national cultural monument.

The historic town centre is formed by the regular rectangular square Náměstí T. G. Masaryka and adjacent streets. On the square is the plague column built in 1719–1720. The landmark of the square is the town hall. It is a late Gothic building from around 1520, reconstructed in the Renaissance style around 1560. The square includes series of Gothic and Renaissance burgher houses.

The town fortifications were built in the early 16th century. Nowadays, only fragments of the walls and three bastions are preserved.

The Church of the Assumption of the Virgin Mary was a Gothic building from the 13th century. It was reconstructed in the Baroque style after the fire in 1726. it was a cemetery church until 1500, when the cemetery was relocated to the newly built Church of the Exaltation of the Holy Cross on the hill Křížový vrch.

== Notable people ==
- Carl Giskra (1820–1879), Austrian politician
- Walther Hensel (1887–1956), music researcher
- Magda B. Arnold (1903–2002), psychologist
- Friedrich Lang (1915–2003), Luftwaffe pilot
- Gert Wilden (1917–2015), composer and conductor
- Jaroslava Maxová (born 1957), opera singer and vocal coach
- Marcel Kolaja (born 1980), politician
- Taťána Malá (born 1981), politician
- Roman Kreuziger (born 1986), road cyclist
- Leopold König (born 1987), road cyclist

== Twin towns – sister cities ==
Moravská Třebová is twinned with:

- Banská Štiavnica, Slovakia
- Staufenberg, Germany
- Vlaardingen, Netherlands
