= Orlické Foothills =

Mountain range in the Czech Republic–Poland border

- Orlicko Foothills, Podorlicko Foothills
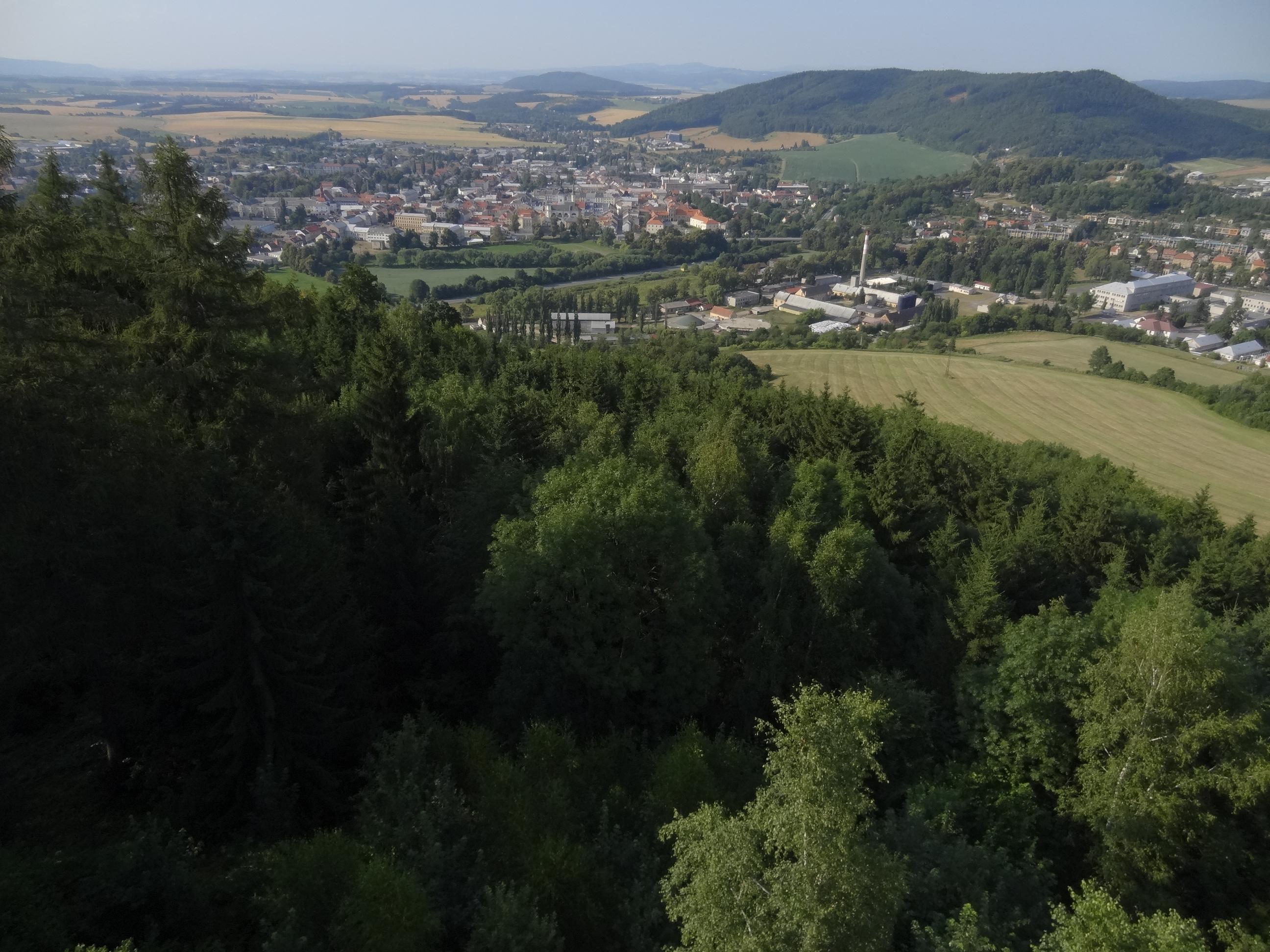
- View of Moravská Třebová

Highest point
- Peak: Špičák
- Elevation: 841 m (2,759 ft)

Dimensions
- Length: 110 km (68 mi)
- Area: 1,157 km^{2} (447 mi^{2})

Geography
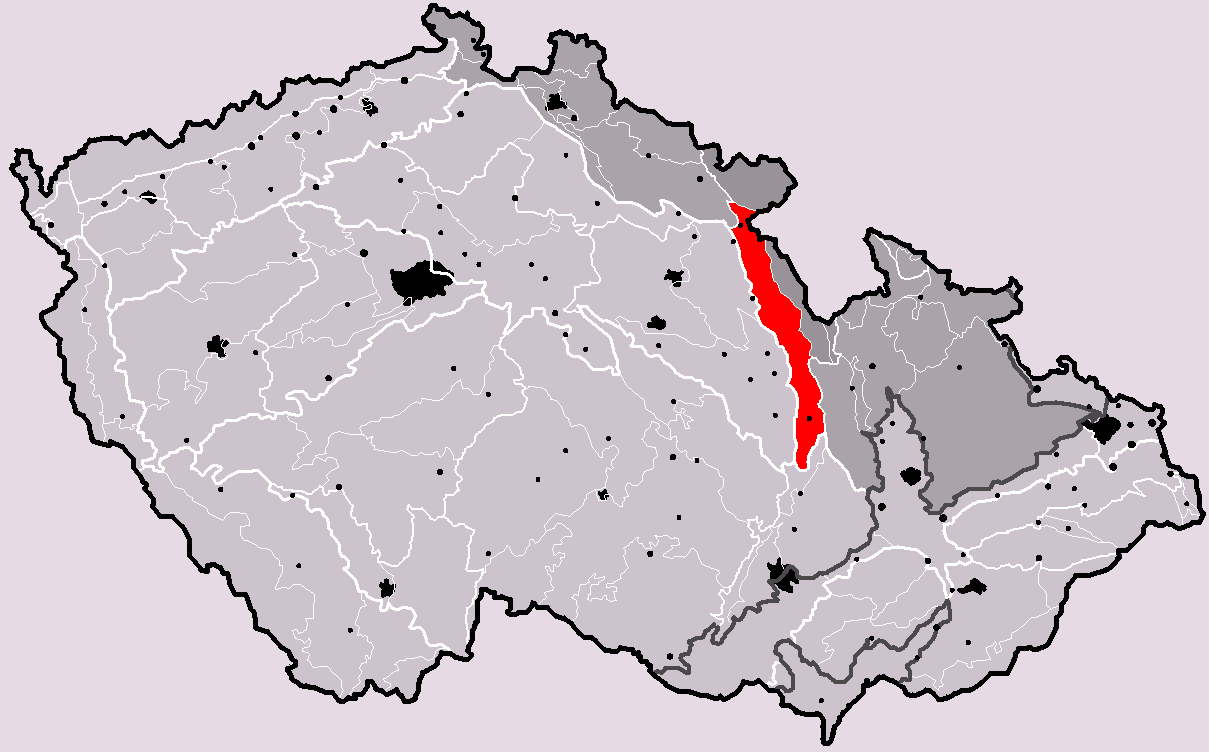
- Orlické Foothills in the geomorphological system of the Czech Republic
- Countries: Czech Republic, Poland
- Regions/ Voivodeships: Hradec Králové, Pardubice, South Moravian / Lower Silesian
- Range coordinates: 50°4′N 16°29′E
- Parent range: Central Sudetes

Orlické Foothills (also called Orlicko Foothills or Podorlicko Foothills; Czech: Podorlická pahorkatina, Polish: Pogórze Orlickie) are foothills of the Orlické Mountains range and a geomorphological mesoregion of the Czech Republic and Poland. It is located in the Hradec Králové, Pardubice and South Moravian regions of the Czech Republic, and a small part extends into the Lower Silesian Voivodeship in Poland.

== Geomorphology ==
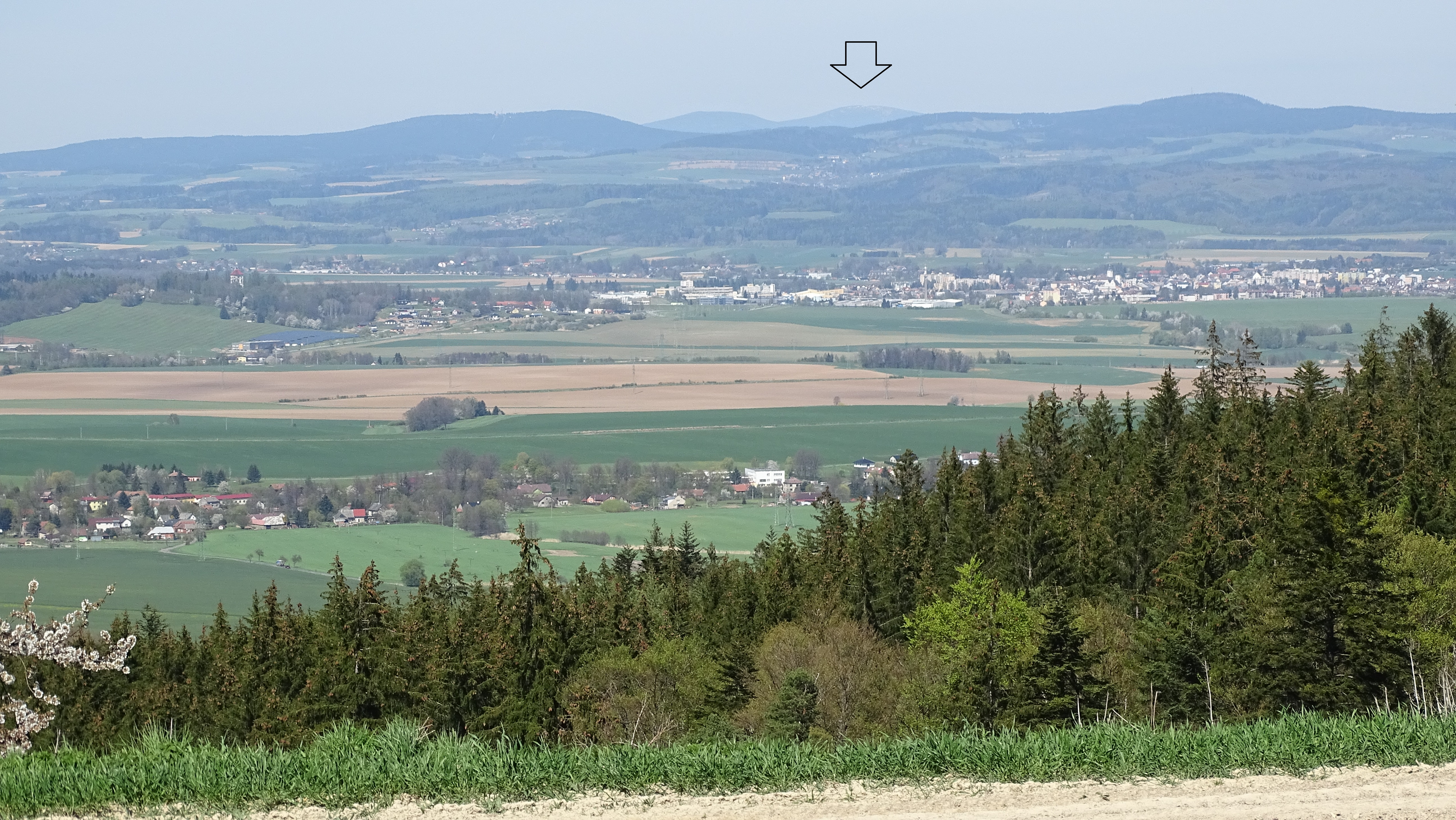
Central part of Orlické Foothills with the town of Lanškroun

The Orlické Foothills is a mesoregion of the Central Sudetes within the Bohemian Massif. The mesoregion extends along the Orlické Mountains. The territory is rugged with many hills and other distinctive landforms. The mesoregion is further subdivided into the microregions of Náchod Highlands, Žamberk Uplands and Moravská Třebová Uplands.

The highest peaks of the Orlické Foothills are:

- Špičák, 841 m (2,759 ft)
- Plasnický Špičák, 834 m (2,736 ft)
- Chřiby, 776 m (2,546 ft)
- Skutina, 742 m (2,434 ft)
- Podolský kopec, 737 m (2,418 ft)
- Čihadlo, 713 m (2,339 ft)
- Feistův kopec, 710 m (2,330 ft)
- Ovčár, 707 m (2,320 ft)
- Bělá, 682 m (2,238 ft)
- Červený kopec, 680 m (2,230 ft)

== Geology ==
The geological bedrock consists mainly of Permian sedimentary rocks and Cretaceous sandstones and spongolites. The valleys are filled with Neogene sedimentary rocks. In the south there are Carboniferous sedimentary rocks (greywackes and conglomerates). Near Moravská Třebová is a deposit of jaspers and agates.

== Geography ==
The Orlické Foothills has an area of 1,157 km^{2} (447 sq mi), of which 1,115 km^{2} (431 sq mi) is in the Czech Republic. Within the Czech Republic, it has an average elevation of 454 m (1,490 ft). The territory has an elongated shape from the north to the south, which is about 110 km (68 mi) long and about 10 km (6 mi) wide.

The area is densely interwoven with many watercourses. The Orlické Foothills is drained by the rivers Tichá Orlice, Divoká Orlice, Dědina and Moravská Sázava. There are no significant bodies of water.

The most populated towns in the territory are Náchod, Kudowa-Zdrój, Lanškroun, Moravská Třebová, Letohrad and Žamberk. The eastern half of Nové Město nad Metují also extends into the Orlické Foothills.

== Nature ==
A part of the protected landscape area of Orlické hory extends into the Orlické Foothills. The forest cover of the area is below average for the Czech Republic. The valleys of the foothills are home to some endangered plant species that have spread here from the Orlické Mountains.
