= Desná (Morava) =

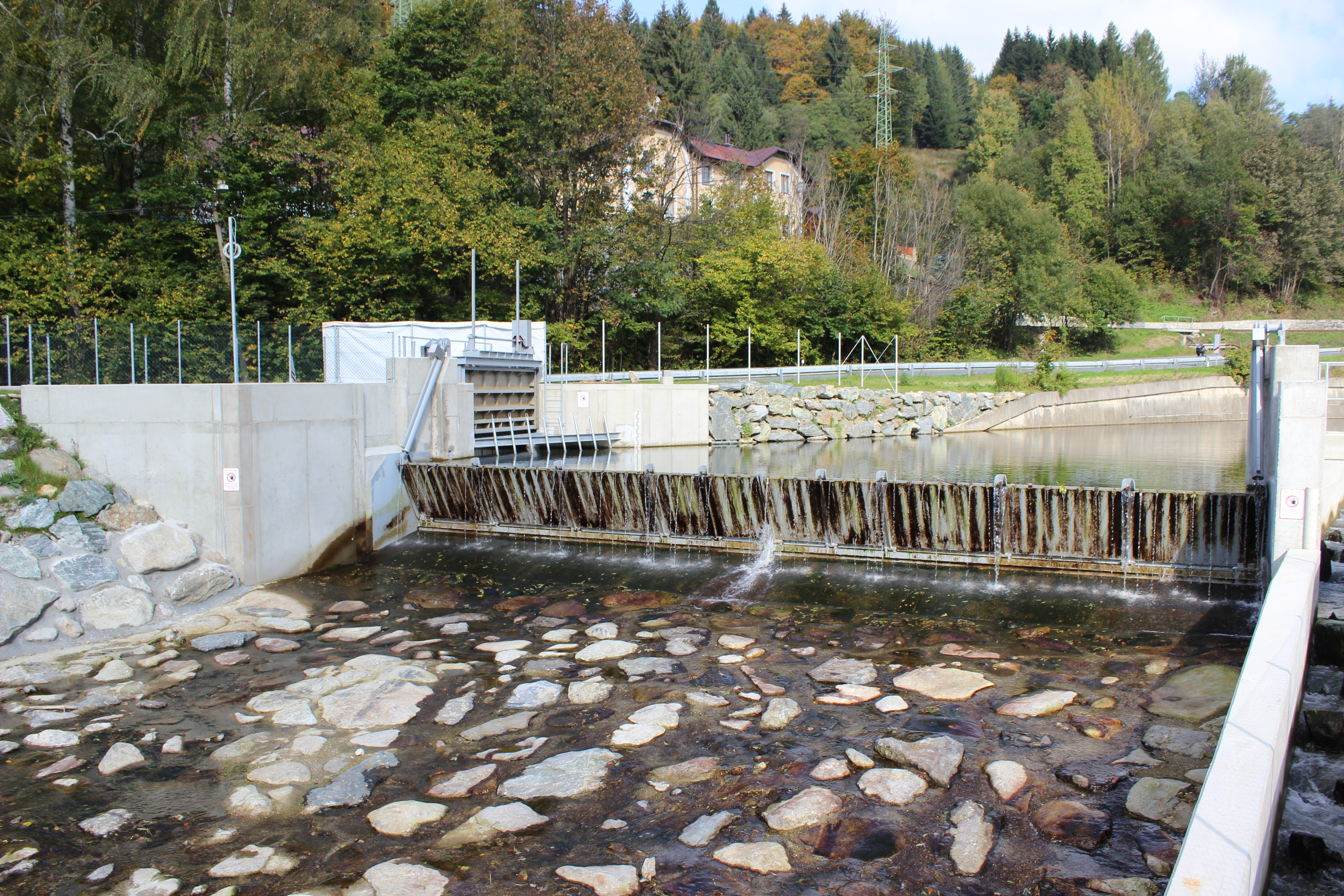
- Upper course of the Desná

Location
- Country: Czech Republic
- Region: Olomouc

Physical characteristics
- Source
  - location: Loučná nad Desnou, Hrubý Jeseník
  - coordinates: 50°3′16″N 17°13′22″E
  - elevation: 1,333 m (4,373 ft)
- Mouth
  - location: Morava
  - coordinates: 49°54′33″N 16°55′48″E
  - elevation: 281 m (922 ft)
- Length: 43.4 km (27.0 mi)
- Basin size: 337.8 km^{2} (130.4 sq mi)
- Discharge
  - average: 4.08 m^{3}/s (144 cu ft/s) near estuary

Basin features
- Progression: Morava→ Danube→ Black Sea

The Desná (called Divoká Desná upstream; German: Tess) is a river in the Czech Republic, a left tributary of the Morava River. It flows through the Olomouc Region. It is 43.4 km (27.0 mi) long.

== Etymology ==
The Old Czech adjective desná meant 'right'. Because people went upstream when settling the landscape, the rivers with this name flowed as if from the right side (although they are actually left-side tributaries). On the upper course, until its confluence with the Hučivá Desná creek, the river is also called Divoká Desná.

== Characteristic ==
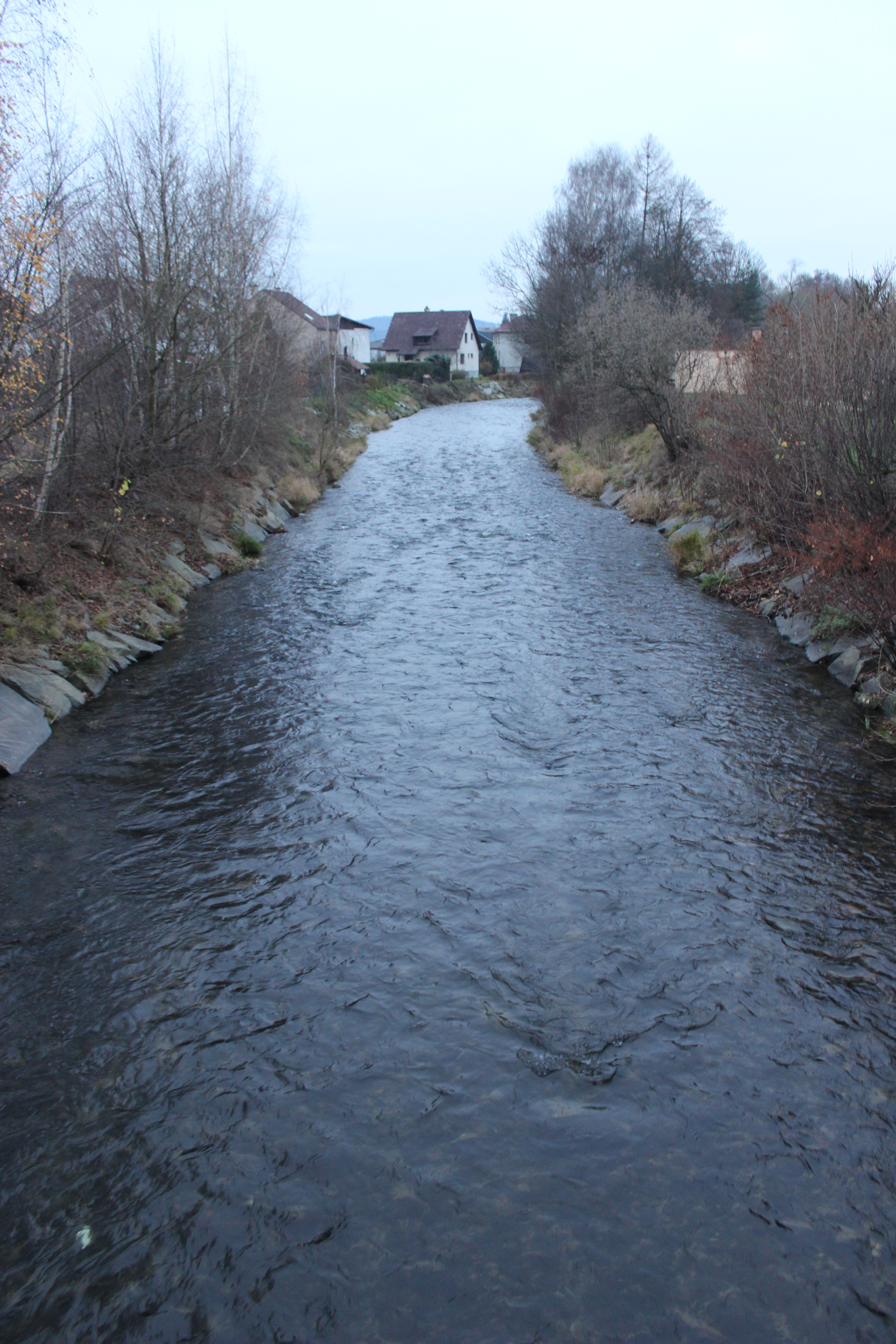
The Desná in Vikýřovice

The Desná originates in the territory of Loučná nad Desnou in the Hrubý Jeseník at the elevation of 1,333 m (4,373 ft) and flows to Postřelmov, where it enters the Morava River at an elevation of 281 m (922 ft). It is 43.4 km (27.0 mi) long. Its drainage basin has an area of 337.8 km^{2} (130.4 sq mi).

The longest tributaries of the Desná are:

Tributary	Length (km)	River km	Side
Merta	17.0	17.0	left
Losinka	12.3	16.5	right
Bratrušovský potok	11.5	8.0	right
Malínský potok	9.8	9.9	left

== Course ==
The river flows through the municipal territories of Loučná nad Desnou, Velké Losiny, Petrov nad Desnou, Rapotín, Vikýřovice, Šumperk, Dolní Studénky, Bludov, Sudkov and Postřelmov.

== Bodies of water ==
There are 95 bodies of water in the basin area. The largest of them are the Dlouhé stráně reservoirs with an area of 13.9 ha (34 acres) (upper reservoir) and 9.5 ha (23 acres) (lower reservoir), built on the Desná. It is known for the Dlouhé stráně Hydro Power Plant. There are two fishponds supplied with water from the lower course of the river.

== Nature ==
The upper course of the river flows through the Jeseníky Protected Landscape Area.

== See also ==
- List of rivers of the Czech Republic
