= Kladivo na čarodějnice =

1963 historical novel by Václav Kaplický

Kladivo na čarodějnice (The Witches' Hammer) is a Czech history novel by Václav Kaplický. It was first published in 1963.

The story is set in 17th century, in a region surrounding Velké Losiny and Šumperk. It is based on a historical event, the witch trials in Northern Moravia during the 1670s orchestrated by inquisitor Boblig from Edelstat to which more than 100 people fell victim. The main character is dean Josef Lautner, a cleric who tries to help his people, but later becomes one of the innocent convicted as well.

The English translation by John A. Newton was published in 1990 by Harbinger House (Tucson).

== Film adaptation ==
In 1970, Otakar Vávra and Ester Krumbachová adapted the novel for the film Witchhammer, directed by Vávra and starring Elo Romančík. The film was banned by the Czechoslovak government.
