= Rapotín =

- Municipality
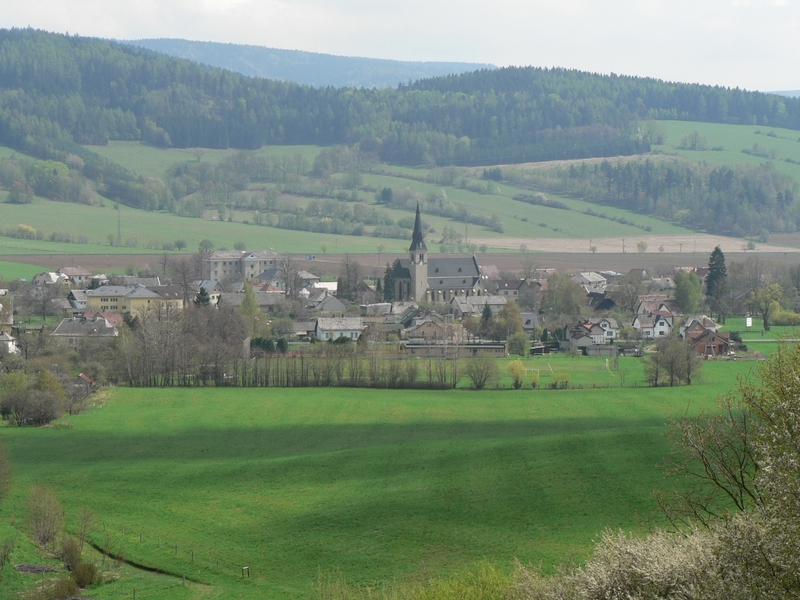
- Panorama of Rapotín

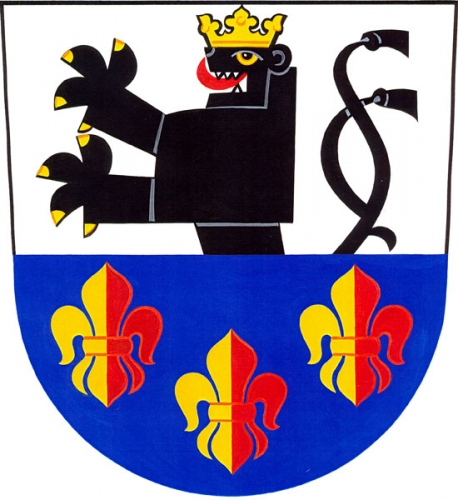
- Flag Coat of arms

- Location in the Czech Republic
- Coordinates: 50°0′3″N 17°1′8″E
- Country: Czech Republic
- Region: Olomouc
- District: Šumperk
- First mentioned: 1391

Area
  - Total: 14.04 km^{2} (5.42 sq mi)
- Elevation: 345 m (1,132 ft)

Population (2026-01-01)
  - Total: 3,322
  - Density: 236.6/km^{2} (612.8/sq mi)
- Time zone: UTC+1 (CET)
  - Summer (DST): UTC+2 (CEST)
- Postal codes: 787 01, 788 13, 788 14
- Website: www.rapotin.cz

Rapotín (Czech pronunciation: [ˈrapociːn]; German: Reitendorf) is a municipality and village in Šumperk District in the Olomouc Region of the Czech Republic. It has about 3,300 inhabitants.

== Geography ==
Rapotín is located about 5 kilometres (3 mi) northeast of Šumperk and 48 km (30 mi) north of Olomouc. It lies in the Hanušovice Highlands. The highest point is the hill Bukový kopec at 641 m (2,103 ft) above sea level. The municipality is situated on the right bank of the Desná River.

== History ==
The first written mention of Rapotín is from 1391. The village was founded by German colonisers in the 13th century. The most notable owners of the village were the Zierotin family. From 1802, it was owned by the Liechtenstein family.

In the second half of the 17th century, the area around the Desná River was where Northern Moravia witch trials took place. There were also seven women from Rapotín among the victims of the inquisition. The burning of the women is commemorated by a memorial from 1678.

Rapotín was damaged during the 1997 Central European flood.

== Demographics ==
Historical population

Year	Pop.	±%
1869	2,080	—
1880	2,152	+3.5%
1890	2,405	+11.8%
1900	2,386	−0.8%
1910	2,589	+8.5%

Year	Pop.	±%
1921	2,346	−9.4%
1930	2,889	+23.1%
1950	2,192	−24.1%
1961	2,499	+14.0%
1970	2,686	+7.5%

Year	Pop.	±%
1980	2,799	+4.2%
1991	2,731	−2.4%
2001	2,898	+6.1%
2011	2,992	+3.2%
2021	3,046	+1.8%

Source: Censuses

== Transport ==
The I/11 road (the section from Šumperk to Bruntál) runs through the municipality. It forks here and continues as the I/44 road to Jeseník and the Czech–Polish border.

Rapotín is located on the railway line from Nezamyslice to Kouty nad Desnou via Prostějov, Olomouc and Šumperk.

== Sights ==
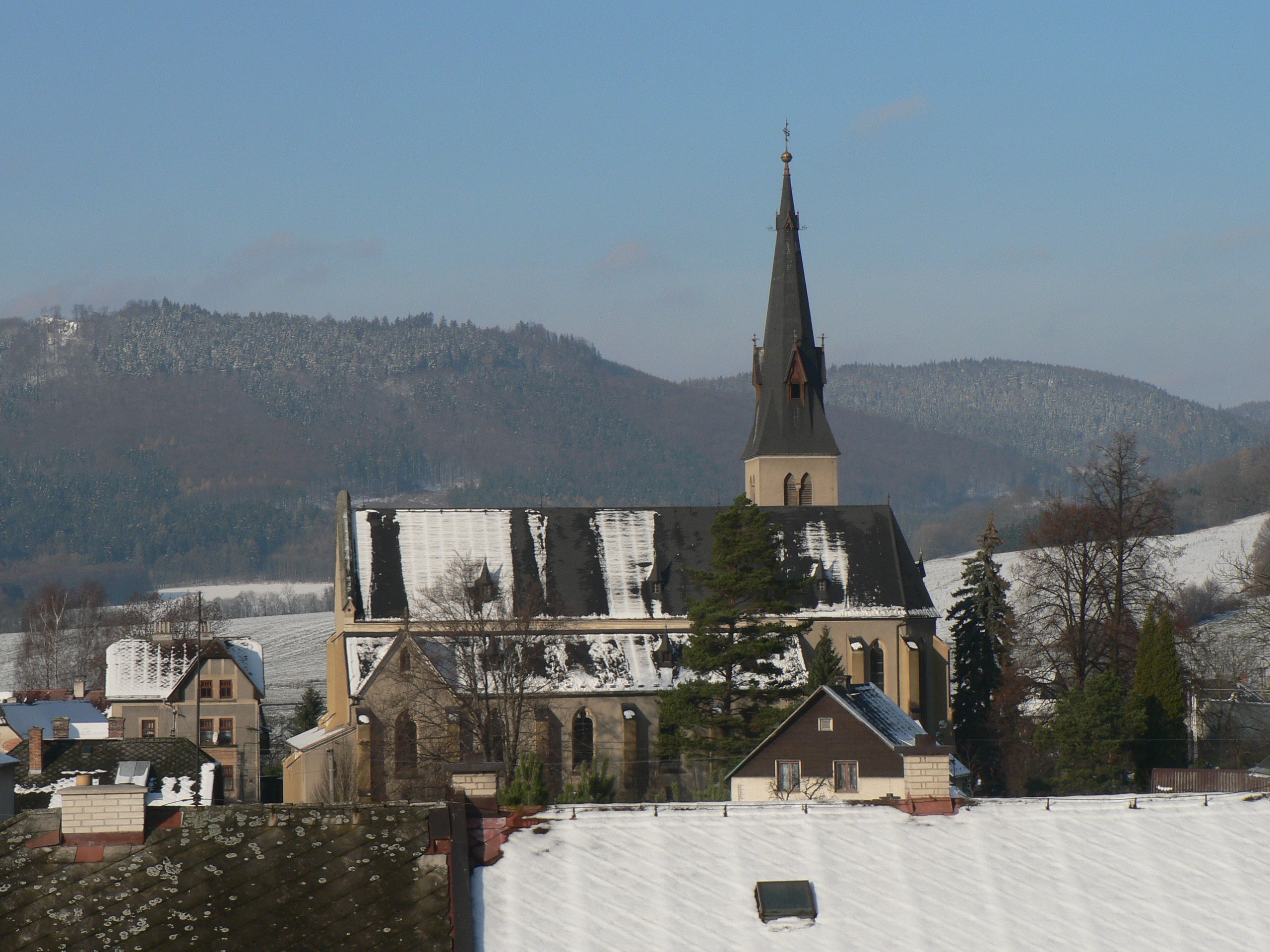
Church of the Assumption of the Virgin Mary

The main landmark of Rapotín is the Church of the Assumption of the Virgin Mary. It is a neo-Gothic church built in 1874, which replaced an old wooden building from the 16th century. It has a 50 m (164 ft) high tower. The church is equipped with a pipe organ made by the Rieger Orgelbau company.

== Twin towns – sister cities ==
Rapotín is twinned with:

- Opatovce nad Nitrou, Slovakia
- Paszowice, Poland
