= Witchhammer =

1970 Czechoslovak drama film

- Directed by: Otakar Vávra
- Written by: Otakar Vávra; Ester Krumbachová
- Based on: Kladivo na čarodějnice by Václav Kaplický
- Starring: Elo Romančík; Vladimír Šmeral; Soňa Valentová
- Cinematography: Josef Illík
- Edited by: Antonín Zelenka
- Music by: Jiří Srnka
- Production company: Filmové studio Barrandov
- Release date: 23 January 1970
- Running time: 103 minutes
- Country: Czechoslovakia
- Language: Czech

Witchhammer (Czech: Kladivo na čarodějnice) is a 1970 Czechoslovak drama film directed by Otakar Vávra and starring Elo Romančík. Based on the novel Kladivo na čarodějnice by Václav Kaplický, Witchhammer relates the story of the Northern Moravia witch trials of the 1670s, focusing on the priest Kryštof Lautner, played by Romančík, who falls victim to the witchhunt after opposing the trials. The film contains possible allegory about Communist show trials in Czechoslovakia.

The film had a limited release in Czechoslovakia. Despite this, it won awards at the Mar del Plata International Film Festival in 1970 and is considered one of Vávra's finest films.

== Plot ==
In the 1670s in Moravia, an altar boy observes an old woman hiding the bread given out during communion. He alerts the priest, who confronts the old woman. She admits that she took the bread with the intent to give it to a cow to re-enable its milk production. The priest reports the incident to the owner of the local estate who, in turn, calls in an inquisitor, a judge specializing in witchcraft trials. Boblig von Edelstadt, the inquisitor, commences an ever-escalating series of trials, with Boblig revering the book Malleus Maleficarum as his guide. The tribunal uses thumbscrews in its interrogations, relying on its conventional use to justify it against torture accusations. However, a priest, Kryštof Lautner, criticizes Boblig for inhumane methods, and another clergy member senses many of the accused women burnt at the stake are in fact innocent, and openly prays for the trials to stop.

Boblig comes to fear Lautner, and one of the accused testifies against Lautner and his cook, Zuzana. Lautner is questioned about having a cook and playing the violin, both unconventional for a clergyman. Lautner replies his late mother took Zuzana in, and he kept her because the girl had nowhere else to go. Lautner's friends, the Sattlers, who possess property to be confiscated by the tribunal, are forced to confess that they accompanied Lautner and Zuzana to Peter's Rock, engaged in fornication and worshiped Lucifer. Under torture, Zuzana is also driven insane and confesses. Lautner denies his friends are telling the truth, while admitting he took Zuzana's virginity. Ultimately, the tribunal rules that the 36 confessions outweigh his professions of innocence. Eventually, Lautner is forced to confess. Boblig finally concludes that he has risen above all ordinary men.

== Cast ==
- Elo Romančík as Kryštof Alois Lautner
- Vladimír Šmeral as Jindřich František Boblig of Edelstadt
- Soňa Valentová as Cook Zuzana Voglicková
- Josef Kemr as Ignác
- Lola Skrbková as Beggar Maryna Schuchová
- Jiřina Štěpničková as Midwife Dorota Groerová
- Marie Nademlejnská as Herbalist Davidka
- Miriam Kantorková as Barber Dorota Tobiášová
- Lubor Tokoš as Kašpar Sattler
- Blažena Holišová as Marie Sattlerová
- Jaroslava Obermaierová as Lízl Sattlerová
- Jiří Holý as Priest Tomáš František König
- Rudolf Krátký as Kašpar Hutter
- Čestmír Řanda as Dean Vojtěch Winkler
- Blanka Waleská as Countess de Galle

== Historical basis ==
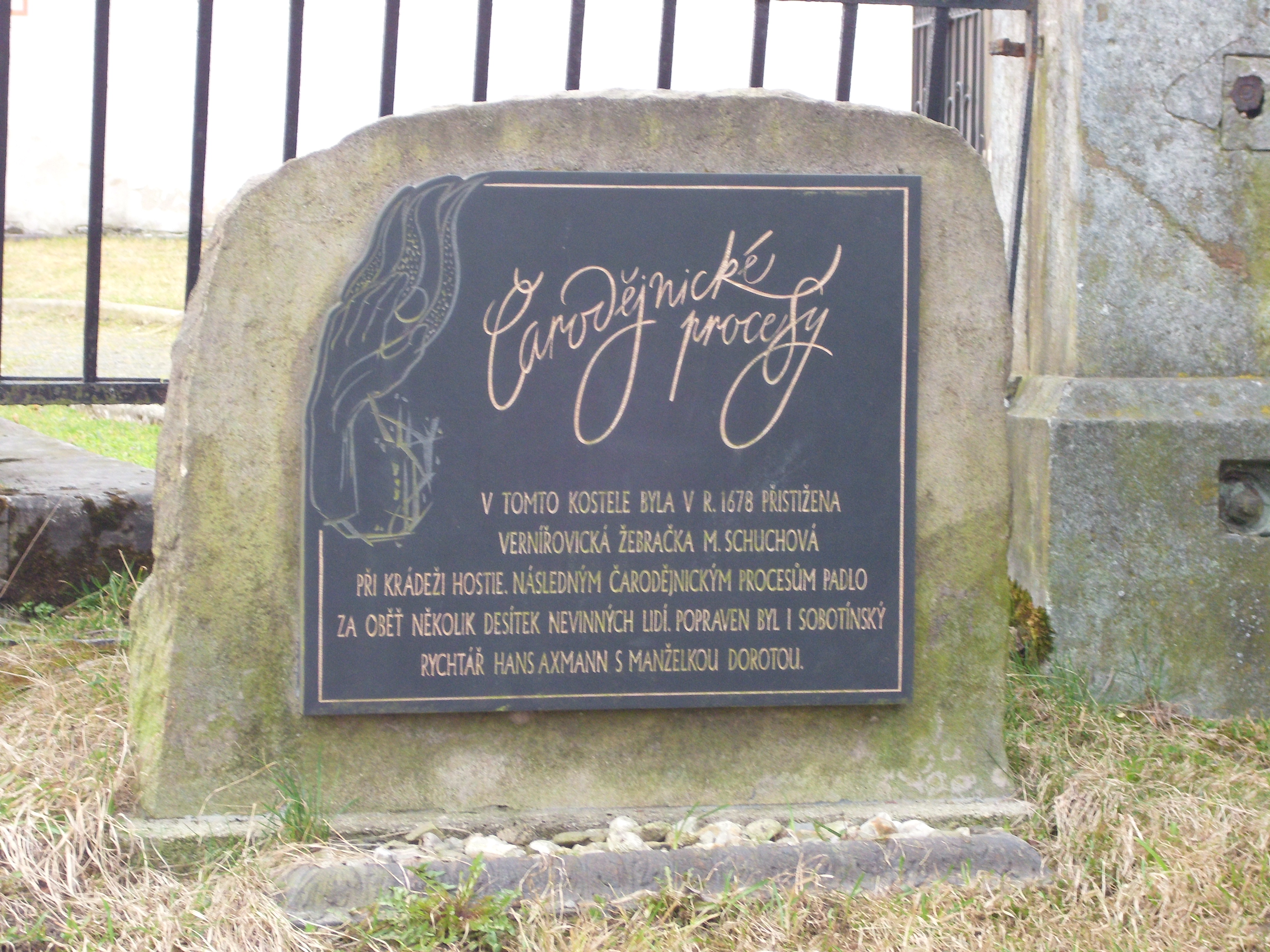
A plaque at the Church of St. Lawrence in Sobotín, Czech Republic, commemorating victims of the Northern Moravia witch trials.

The story of the film is based on Václav Kaplický's book Kladivo na čarodějnice (1963), a novel about witch trials in Northern Moravia during the 1670s. Kryštof Alois Lautner is a historical figure who is portrayed accurately in the novel.

The film is also an allegory substituting the Inquisition for show trials in Communist regimes. Vávra had political trials in the 1950s in mind when co-writing the film. With the Warsaw Pact invasion of Czechoslovakia in 1968 following the Prague Spring, scholar Peter Hames wrote that it was "difficult to see" Witchhammer "as anything other than a response to the political realities of the post-invasion period". Richard Chatten of The Independent wrote the film was "possibly Vavra's indirect disclaimer to a paper to which he was obliged to lend his name in 1968 endorsing the Soviet invasion".

== Production ==
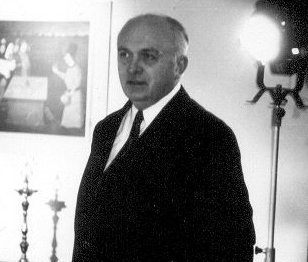
Otakar Vávra co-wrote and directed the film in 1969, consulting trial records.

Director Otakar Vávra made the film in 1969. In crafting the screenplay with Ester Krumbachová, Vávra drew from Kaplický's novel and also records from the historical trials in Šumperk. Vávra was reminded of trials he had seen in the 1950s, stating that "In historical records I came upon sensible, hard-working people who fell quite unexpectedly into the clutches of the revived medieval witch trial machine". Changes made from the novel include beginning the film with women bathing, to the scorn of a monk, as opposed to the novel, which begins with knitting. Vávra and Krumbachová thus set up a theme of sexual repression as political repression, which Krumbachová would continue in her next screenplays.

The film was produced by Barrandov Studios. Cinematographer Josef Illík shot the film in CinemaScope. Krumbachová is also credited with writing the "soldiers' song" used in the film.

Sona Valentová revealed that the props used in the inquisition scene, including the instruments of torture, which were from the museum, had to be authentic.

== Release ==
The film debuted in Czechoslovakia in January 1970. It was viewed by 1.5 million moviegoers before being pulled out of theatres. It was not shown again until 1989. This was part of a general trend after the Warsaw Pact invasion, with more Czechoslovak films banned in 1970 than in the past 20 years. Later, the film had a successful DVD release. In 2022, a Blu-ray of the film was released

== Reception ==
=== Critical reception ===
In the Czech Republic, Witchhammer has been called Vávra's magnum opus. Radio Prague's Jan Richter wrote it is "perhaps the strongest film Otakar Vávra ever made" and "an impressive analogy with what was happening after the Soviet occupation". Scholar Peter Hames also called it "one of his best films".

Critic Paul Simpson wrote the film is "engrossing," and "a Czech The Crucible, but with more female nudity". Andrew Leavold of Senses of Cinema observed comparable allegory to Arthur Miller's play The Crucible, and called it unsubtle but with "deliberately measured pace and a mounting sense of doom". In 2011, Will Tizard of Variety called Witchhammer a "sly parable on paranoia and political persecution," and said it and other films Vávra made in the 1960s are his "most prized artistic legacy to critics".

=== Accolades ===
Award	Date of ceremony	Category	Recipient(s)	Result	Ref(s)
Mar del Plata International Film Festival	5–15 March 1970	Special Mentions	Otakar Vávra	Won	
Mar del Plata International Film Festival	5–15 March 1970	Cineclub Núcleo Awards Best Feature Film	Otakar Vávra	Won	

== See also ==
- List of banned films
- List of Czechoslovak films
