= Postřelmov =

- Municipality
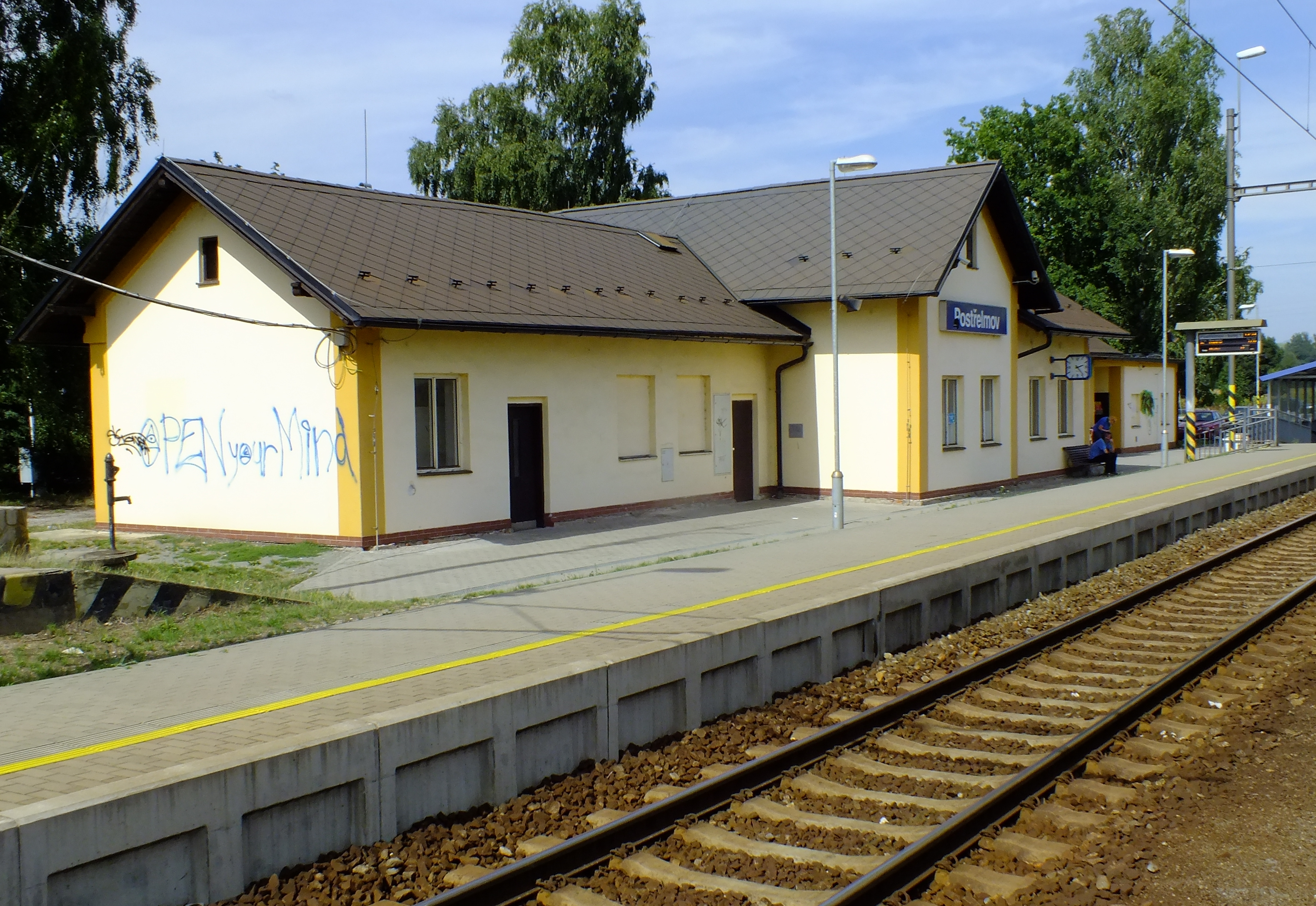
- Railway station

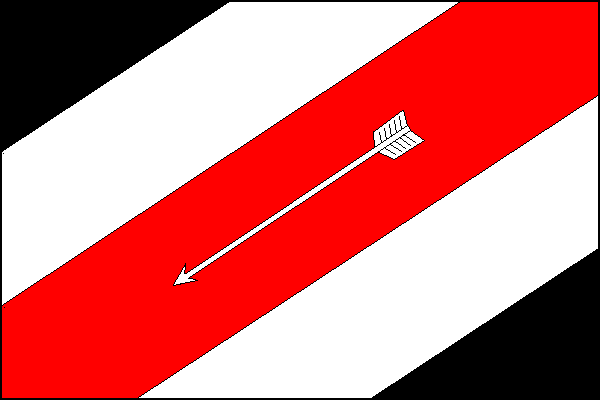
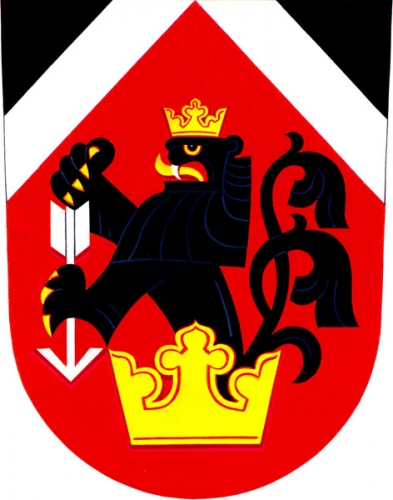
- Flag Coat of arms

- Location in the Czech Republic
- Coordinates: 49°54′27″N 16°54′44″E
- Country: Czech Republic
- Region: Olomouc
- District: Šumperk
- First mentioned: 1349

Area
  - Total: 9.55 km^{2} (3.69 sq mi)
- Elevation: 284 m (932 ft)

Population (2026-01-01)
  - Total: 2,894
  - Density: 303/km^{2} (785/sq mi)
- Time zone: UTC+1 (CET)
  - Summer (DST): UTC+2 (CEST)
- Postal code: 789 69
- Website: www.postrelmov.cz

Postřelmov (German: Gross Heilendorf) is a municipality and village in Šumperk District in the Olomouc Region of the Czech Republic. It has about 2,900 inhabitants.

== Geography ==
Postřelmov is located about 7 kilometres (4 mi) southwest of Šumperk and 42 km (26 mi) northwest of Olomouc. It lies in the Mohelnice Depression. The municipality is situated at the confluence of the rivers Morava and Desná.

== History ==
The first written mention of Postřelmov is from 1349. In the 15th century, the largest pond in Moravia with an area of 106 ha (260 acres) was built here, but only a part of the embankment has survived to this day. For centuries, Postřelmov was an agricultural village, but at the end of the 19th century, it was industrialised.

== Demographics ==
Historical population

Year	Pop.	±%
1869	855	—
1880	1,145	+33.9%
1890	1,179	+3.0%
1900	1,316	+11.6%
1910	1,767	+34.3%

Year	Pop.	±%
1921	1,798	+1.8%
1930	1,975	+9.8%
1950	1,735	−12.2%
1961	2,148	+23.8%
1970	2,429	+13.1%

Year	Pop.	±%
1980	2,819	+16.1%
1991	3,204	+13.7%
2001	3,235	+1.0%
2011	3,156	−2.4%
2021	2,832	−10.3%

Source: Censuses

== Transport ==
Postřelmov is located on the railway lines Brno–Šumperk and Nezamyslice–Kouty nad Desnou.

== Sights ==
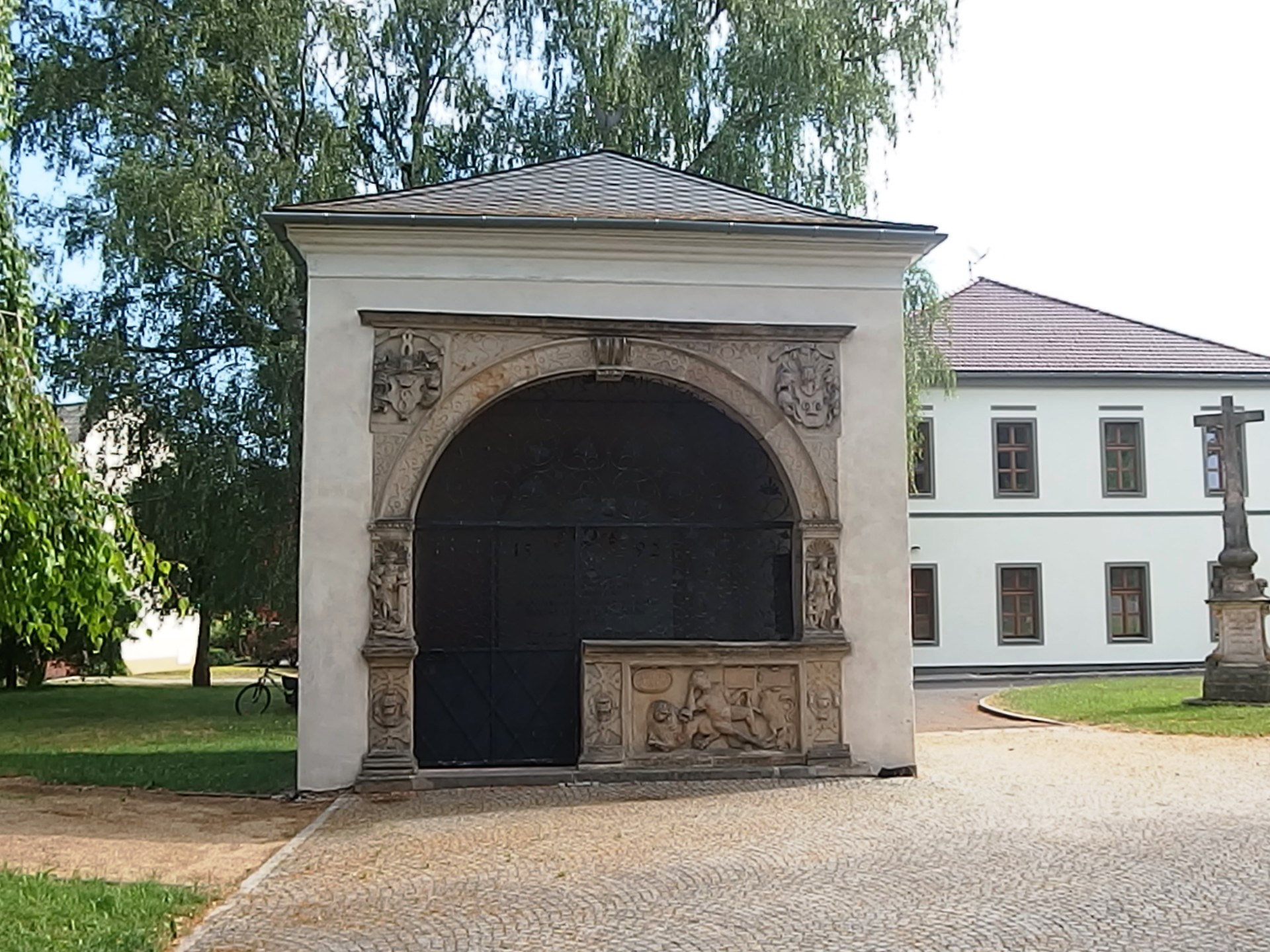
Bukůvka of Bukůvka family tomb

The main landmark of Postřelmov is the Church of Saint Matthew. The original Gothic church was probably built in the 14th century, but it was destroyed by a fire in 1664 or 1665, and rebuilt in the Baroque style. In 1853, it was reconstructed and extended.

The most valuable buildings are the Renaissance tomb of the noble Bukůvka of Bukůvka family from 1592, and the early Baroque Chapel of Saint Procopius from 1696.

== Notable people ==
- Lubomír Doležel (1922–2017), literary theorist; grew up here

== Twin towns – sister cities ==
Postřelmov is twinned with:

- Kamenec pod Vtáčnikom, Slovakia
- Moyenneville, France
- Willingham by Stow, England, United Kingdom
