= Mohelnice =

- Town
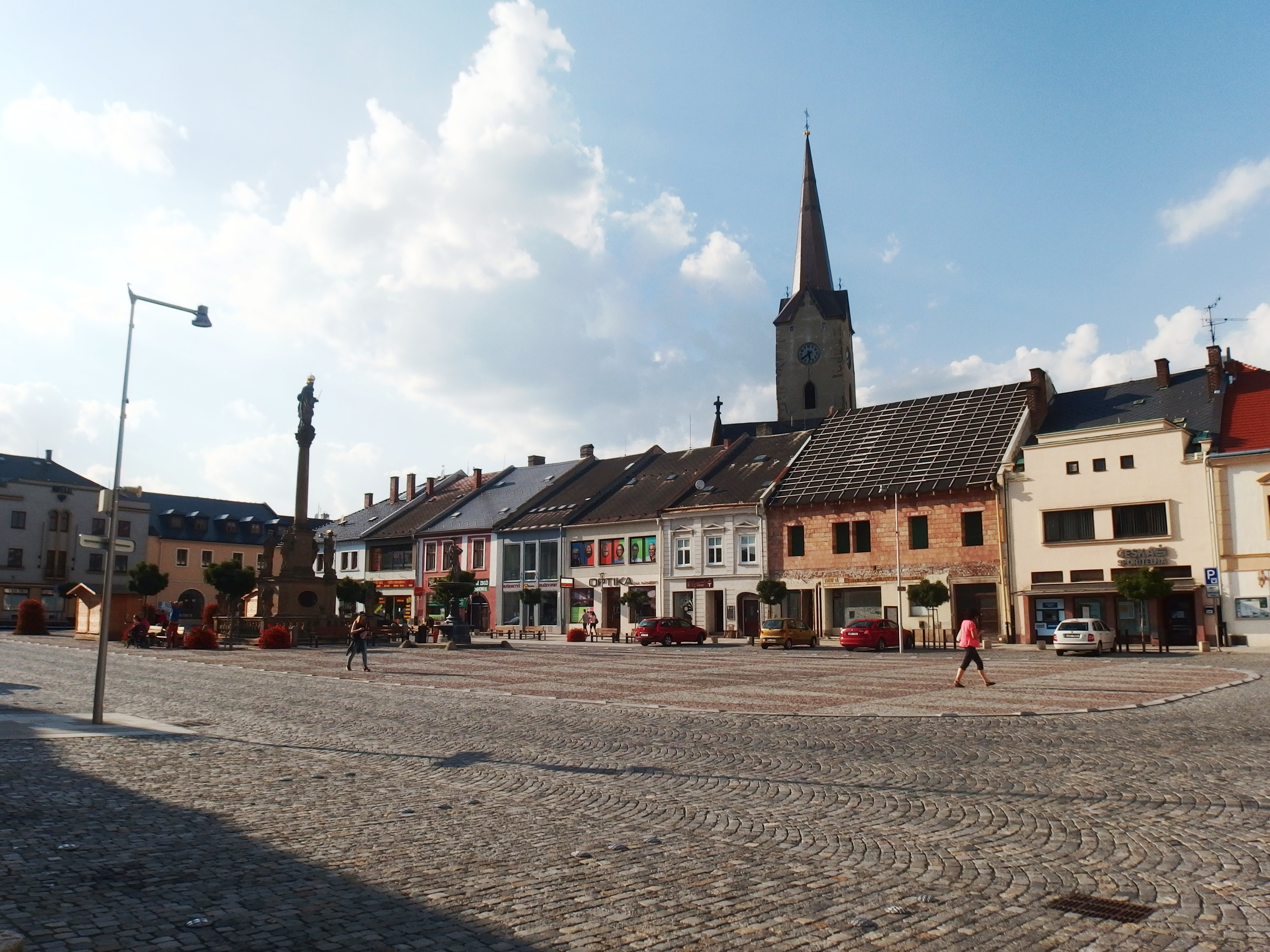
- The square Náměstí Svobody

- Flag Coat of arms

- Location in the Czech Republic
- Coordinates: 49°46′37″N 16°55′10″E
- Country: Czech Republic
- Region: Olomouc
- District: Šumperk
- First mentioned: 1141

Government
  - Mayor: Pavel Kuba

Area
  - Total: 46.24 km^{2} (17.85 sq mi)
- Elevation: 267 m (876 ft)

Population (2026-01-01)
  - Total: 9,886
  - Density: 213.8/km^{2} (553.7/sq mi)
- Time zone: UTC+1 (CET)
  - Summer (DST): UTC+2 (CEST)
- Postal code: 789 85
- Website: www.mohelnice.cz

Mohelnice (Czech pronunciation: [ˈmoɦɛlɲɪtsɛ]; German: Müglitz) is a town in Šumperk District in the Olomouc Region of the Czech Republic. It has about 9,900 inhabitants. The town is located in a predominantly agricultural landscape near the Morava River.

Mohelnice is an industrial town, but the historic town centre is well preserved and is protected as an urban monument zone. The town is known for a festival of folk and country music, since 2020 known as Mohelnický FolkFest.

== Administrative division ==
Mohelnice consists of eight municipal parts (in brackets population according to the 2021 census):

- Mohelnice (7,717)
- Křemačov (157)
- Květín (134)
- Libivá (212)
- Podolí (390)
- Řepová (154)
- Studená Loučka (176)
- Újezd (201)

Studená Loučka forms an exclave of the municipal territory.

== Geography ==
Mohelnice is located about 21 kilometres (13 mi) south of Šumperk and 30 km (19 mi) northwest of Olomouc, in the fertile Haná region. The eastern part of the municipal territory with the town proper lies in a flat agricultural landscape in the Mohelnice Depression, while the western part lies in the Zábřeh Highlands. The highest point is the hill Hekelův kopec at 583 m (1,913 ft) above sea level.

The Mírovka Stream flows through the town into the Morava River, which forms the eastern municipal border. In the eastern part of Mohelnice are located two artificial lakes created by flooding sandstone quarries, Mohelnické jezero and Moravičanské jezero. The easternmost part of Mohelnice with Moravičanské jezero is situated in the Litovelské Pomoraví Protected Landscape Area.

== History ==
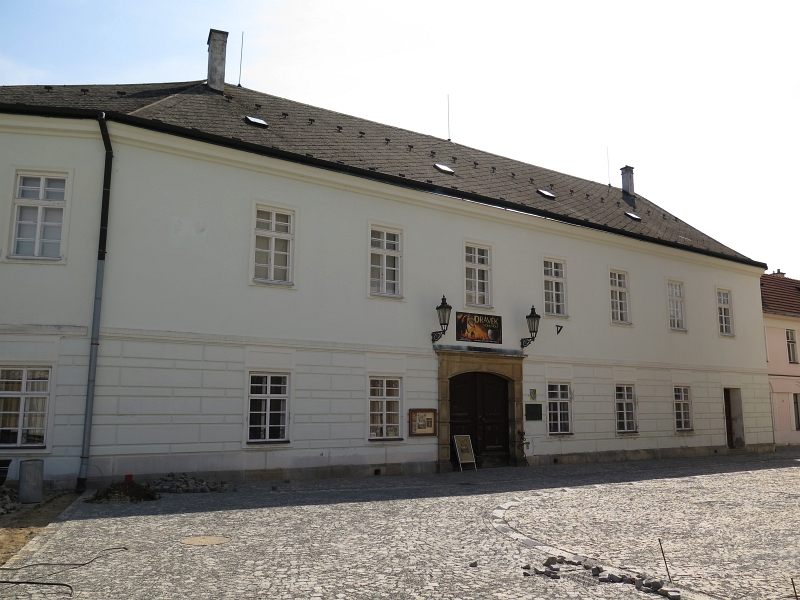
Bishop's Castle

The first written mention of Mohelnice is in a deed of bishop Jindřich Zdík from 1141, when it was owned by the Olomouc bishopric. In 1273, Mohelnice was first referred to as a town.

In 1307 and 1312, the town was devastated by plague. In 1424, it was conquered by the Hussites and 700 people died. During the first half of the 16th century, the town was rebuilt and the town fortifications were built. The Thirty Years' War devastated Mohelnice – in 1623 it was plundered by the Swedish troops and over 30% of the inhabitants died of the plague. The Swedes looted the town again in 1642, 1643, 1644 and 1647. Half of the town was destroyed by fire in 1662. The year 1685 saw the notorious Northern Moravia witch trials during which a local vicar Alois Lautner was burned at the stake.

The town's textile industry began operating in 1713, and in 1714 the town suffered another plague. There was another significant fire in 1739, which destroyed more than half of the town. During the Silesian Wars the town was plundered several times. In 1772 Mohelnice had 1,867 inhabitants, in 1792 it was 3,887. There were cholera epidemics in 1832, 1849, 1851 and 1866. The town suffered from fire in 1841 and several smaller fires later. In 1863, Mohelnice built its first sanitation system.

In the 19th and 20th century, the town was industrialised and various factories were established. In 1910, most of the old town walls were demolished.

Before World War II, the town had a German-speaking majority population. From 1938 to 1945, the town was occupied by Nazi Germany and administered as part of the Reichsgau Sudetenland. After the war, the German population was expelled. This caused the town to become almost deserted. Within a few months, however, the town was repopulated by families from other parts of Czechoslovakia.

In the second half of the 20th century the town went through major urban changes, including the narrowing of the Mírovka Stream.

== Demographics ==
Historical population

| Year | Pop. | ±% |
|---|---|---|
| 1869 | 8,015 | — |
| 1880 | 8,630 | +7.7% |
| 1890 | 7,983 | −7.5% |
| 1900 | 7,485 | −6.2% |
| 1910 | 7,540 | +0.7% |

| Year | Pop. | ±% |
|---|---|---|
| 1921 | 7,845 | +4.0% |
| 1930 | 7,569 | −3.5% |
| 1950 | 6,526 | −13.8% |
| 1961 | 7,018 | +7.5% |
| 1970 | 7,522 | +7.2% |

| Year | Pop. | ±% |
|---|---|---|
| 1980 | 8,539 | +13.5% |
| 1991 | 9,704 | +13.6% |
| 2001 | 9,847 | +1.5% |
| 2011 | 9,428 | −4.3% |
| 2021 | 9,141 | −3.0% |

Source: Censuses

== Economy ==
Mohelnice is predominantly industrial town with significant electrotechnical, engineering and construction industries. There is an industrial zone on the eastern outskirts of the town. The largest employer based in the town is Hella Autotechnik Nova, manufacturer of lighting for the automotive industry. With more than 3,000 employees, it is the largest industrial company in the Olomouc Region. The second most notable company in the town is Montix (manufacturer of plastic parts, especially for the automotive industry).

== Transport ==
The I/35 road (part of the European route E442) runs through the town. It replaces the unfinished section of the D35 motorway from Olomouc to the Hradec Králové Region. The I/44 road splits from it and connects Mohelnice with Šumperk and Jeseník.

Mohelnice is located on the railway lines Prague–Olomouc (further continuing to Vsetín or Staré Město) and Nezamyslice–Kouty nad Desnou.

== Culture ==
From 1975, Mohelnice was known for the folk and country music festival Mohelnický dostavník. The tradition ended in 2020, however, it has since been replaced by the Mohelnický FolkFest festival with the same focus.

== Sights ==
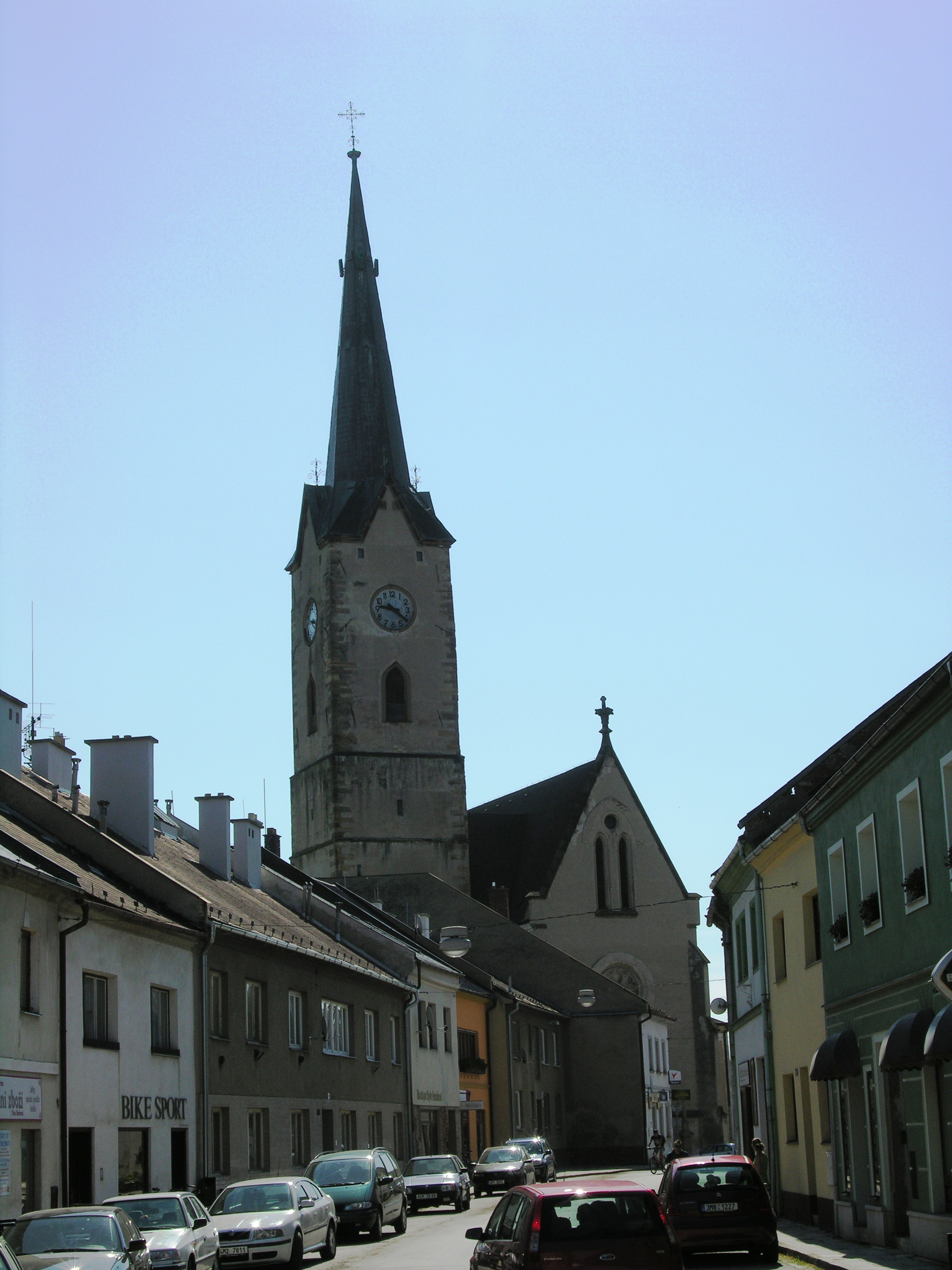
Church of Saint Thomas of Canterbury

The historic centre consists of the historic floor plan of the town with a central square and annular streets. The square Náměstí Svobody is partially lined by two-storey burgher houses. Remains of the walls and the northern entrance gate from 1540 have been preserved from the town fortifications.

The second important area is the square Kostelní náměstí with the Church of Saint Thomas of Canterbury. The original church on this site was first mentioned in 1247. This church was expanded in the 14th century, and rebuilt in the 15th century after it was burned down. Gothic, Renaissance and Baroque style intertwines in its construction. The last modifications were in the Neo-Gothic style. The parish church has a rich Baroque interior decoration. The church tower is the main landmark of the town.

The Church of Saint Stanislaus was built in 1584. It was reconstructed in the Baroque style in the 17th and 18th centuries.

The Bishop's Castle on the Kostelní náměstí is one of the oldest preserved buildings in whole region. It was built in the 13th century at the latest. Today it houses a regional museum.

== Notable people ==
- Antonín Brus of Mohelnice (1518–1580), Archbishop of Prague
- Antal Stašek (1843–1931), writer; worked here in 1913–1914
- Edmund Reitter (1845–1920), Austrian entomologist, writer and collector
- Karl Penka (1847–1912), Austrian philologist and anthropologist
- Max Bernhauer (1866–1946), Austrian entomologist
- Richard Schmitz (1885–1954), mayor of Vienna in 1934–1938
- Martin Horák (born 1980), footballer

== Twin towns – sister cities ==
Mohelnice is twinned with:

- Radlin, Poland
