= Kaplický =

Kaplický is a Czech surname. It's bearers include:

- Jan Kaplický (1937–2009), Czech architect
- Václav Kaplický (1895–1982), Czech writer

== See also ==
- chapel (Czech: kaple, (dim.) kapl-ice)
  - kaplička (cs)
  - Kaplice (cs)
