= Mírovka =

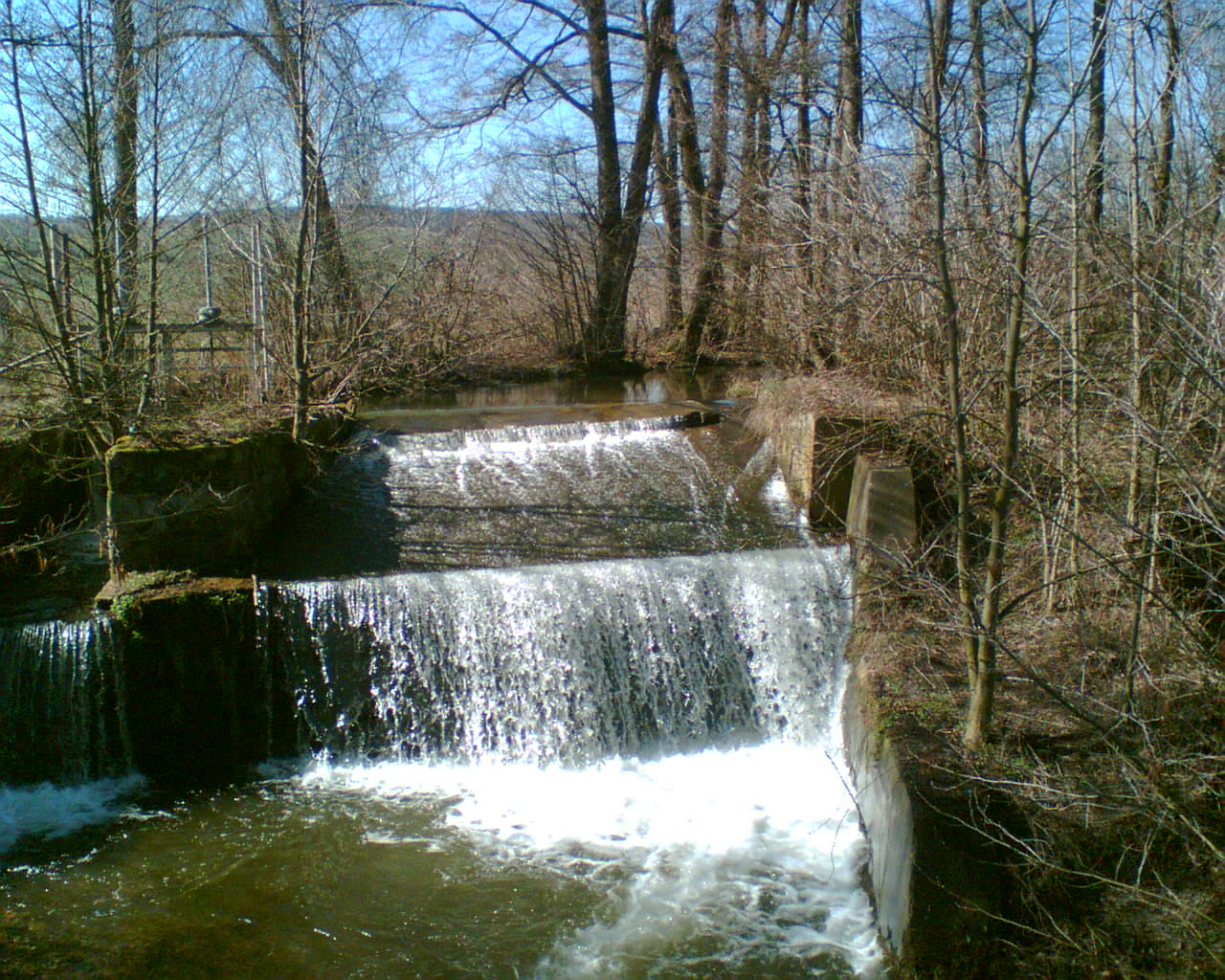

Location
- Country: Czech Republic

Physical characteristics
- Mouth
  - location: Morava
  - coordinates: 49°46′56″N 16°57′41″E

Basin features
- Progression: Morava→ Danube→ Black Sea

Mírovka (German: Grundbach) is a creek in Šumperk District, Moravia, right tributary of the Morava River. Its length is 20,2 km and its drainage basin covers 49.6 km2. The mean annual discharge at its mouth is 0.25 m³/s.

The Mírovka originates near Maletín village, 400 meters above sea level.

The Mírovka flows through settlements of Maletín, Starý Maletín, Svojanov and Nový Maletín which are grouped into single municipality called Maletín. Two water reservoirs were built in this place – the Svojanov reservoir and the Maletín reservoir. Upper the Maletín reservoir occupies approximately 2.6 ha, lower The Svojanov Reservoir occupies approximately 1.5 ha. Both are primarily used for fishing.

The Mírovka then goes east into forest of Moravsko-Třebovská pahorkatina (literally Moravská Třebová Hills), flowing next to a paved road. Mírov, the super-maximum security prison, is located in this area. Lower reaches are situated in agricultural flatland of Mohelnická brázda, feeding Křemačovský rybník, which area is 3 ha. Then the creek flows through Mohelnice. It empties into a millrace that is connected with the Morava, just few meters away from a border of the Litovelské Pomoraví Protected Landscape Area.

Moravičanské jezero (literally Moravičany lake) is in a neighborhood of the creek mouth. This manmade lake, which is a consequence of a sand mining, is widely used for recreation and fishery. It occupies about 90 ha.
