= The Struggle Will End Tomorrow =

- Directed by: Miroslav Cikán
- Starring: Elo Romančík
- Cinematography: Karol Krska
- Music by: Eugen Suchoň
- Release date: 1951
- Country: Czechoslovakia
- Language: Slovak

The Struggle Will End Tomorrow (Slovak: Boj sa skončí zajtra) is a 1951 Czechoslovak drama film directed by Miroslav Cikán. With a screenplay written by Ivan Bukovčan, the film stars Elo Romančík, Gustáv Valach, Vladimír Petruška, Štefan Adamec, Mikuláš Huba, Andrej Bagar, Ľudovít Jakubóczy, Jozef Budský, Martin Gregor, and Samuel Adamčík. The film was awarded the Special Jury Prize by an international jury at the Karlovy Vary International Film Festival in 1954.
