= Miriam Kantorková =

Czech actress

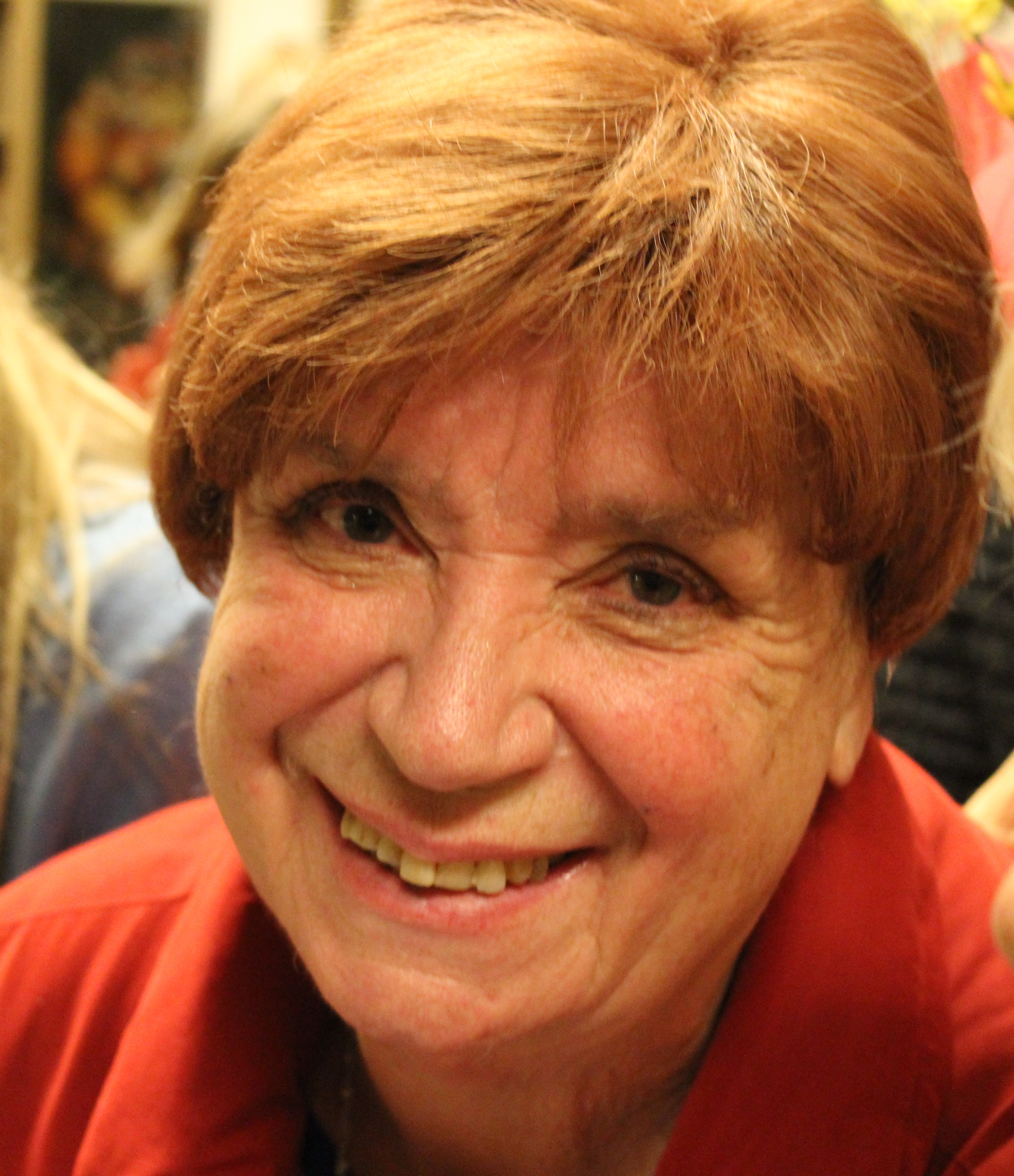
- Miriam Kantorková in 2014
- Born: 13 March 1935 (age 90); Prague, Czechoslovakia
- Occupation: Actress
- Years active: 1957–present

Miriam Kantorková (born 13 March 1935 in Prague) is a Czech actress. She starred in the 1970 film Witchhammer under director Otakar Vávra.

== Selected filmography ==
- První parta (1959)
- Romance for Bugle (1967)
- Witchhammer (1970)
