= Soňa Valentová =

Slovak actress (1946–2022)

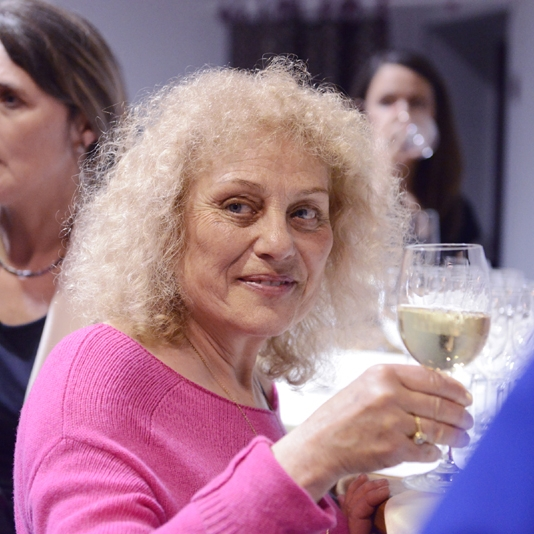
- Valentová in 2015
- Born: 3 June 1946; Trnava, Czechoslovakia (now Slovakia)
- Died: 10 December 2022 (aged 76)
- Occupation: Actress
- Years active: 1964–2010
- Spouse: Pavol Haspra

Soňa Valentová (later Hasprová; 3 June 1946 – 10 December 2022) was a Slovak actress. She starred in the 1969/1970 film Witchhammer under director Otakar Vávra. She was born in Trnava.

Valentová died on 10 December 2022, at the age of 76.
