= Jaroslava Obermaierová =

Czech actress (born 1946)

- Born: 10 April 1946 (age 80); Prague, Czechoslovakia
- Occupation: Actress
- Years active: 1965–2026
- Children: 1

Jaroslava Obermaierová (born 10 April 1946) is a Czech actress. She starred in the 1969/1970 film Witchhammer under director Otakar Vávra, as well as the TV-series Ulice.

In October 2026, Obermaierová disclosed that she had been diagnosed with lung cancer.

== Filmography ==
=== Film ===
- 1965 Souhvězdí Panny – role: Jana
- 1965 7 zabitých – role: nurse Eva
- 1967 Happy End
- 1968 Rakev ve snu viděti… – role: singer Zuzana Korejsová
- 1969 Kladivo na čarodějnice – role: Líza Sattlerová
- 1977 Což takhle dát si špenát – role: Vilma (fiancee of Zemánek)
- 1979 Smrt stopařek – role: Petra Jarošová
