= Paper Mill at Velké Losiny =

Paper mill in Velké Losiny, Czech Republic

Paper mill at Velké Losiny
- Velké Losiny, Olomouc Region
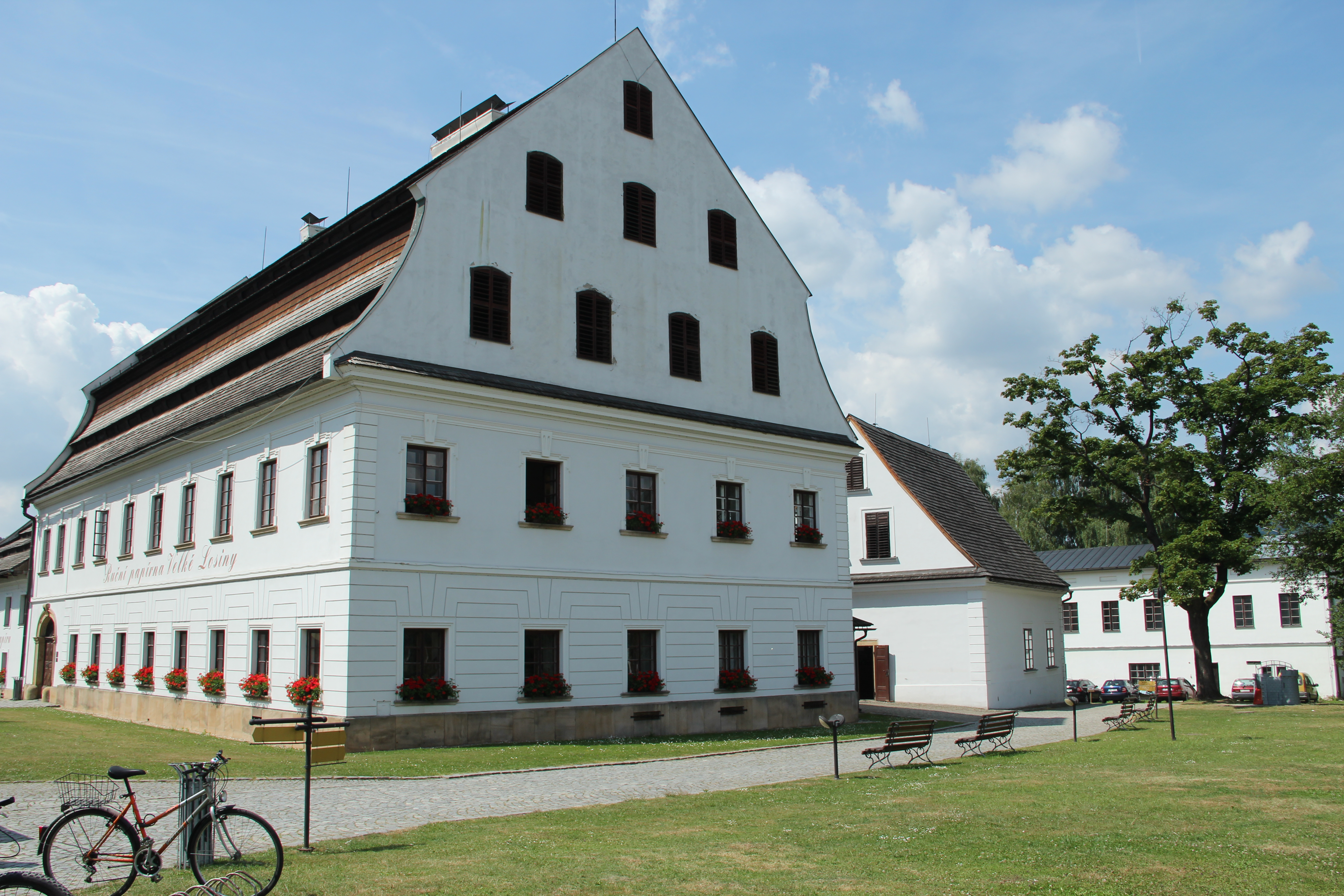
- Paper mill at Velké Losiny

Site information
- Type: Paper mill

Location
- Location within Czech Republic
- Coordinates: 50°1′47″N 17°2′18″E

Site history
- Built: 1596

The Paper mill at Velké Losiny is a historic mill in Velké Losiny in the Olomouc Region of the Czech Republic. It was founded in the late 16th century and is manufacturing handmade paper to this day. The four-hundred-year continuity of traditional handmade paper production is unparalleled in Central Europe and in 2001 the paper mill was declared a Czech national cultural monument.

== History ==
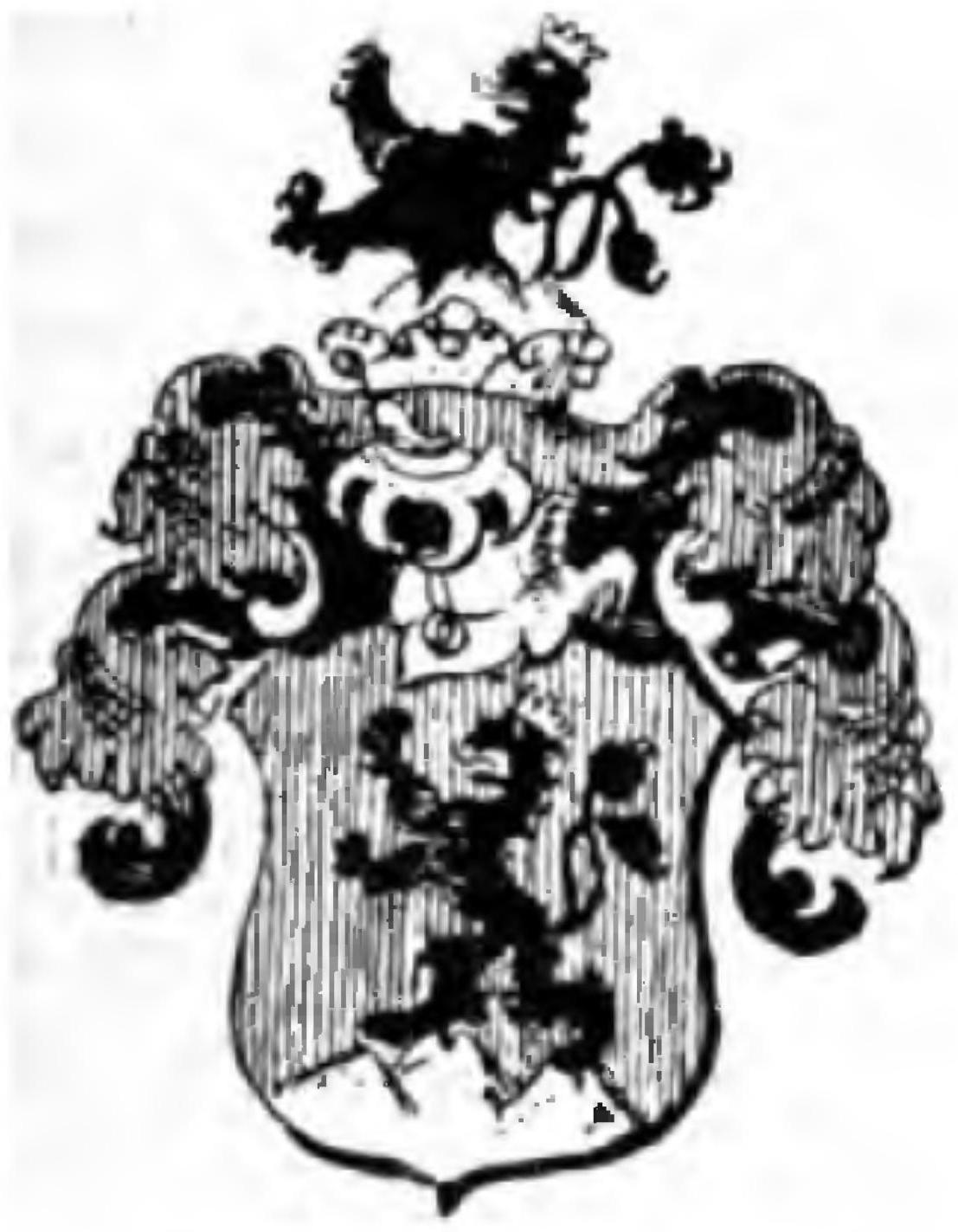
Zierotin coat of arms

The paper mill was built sometime between 1591 and 1596 by Jan Zierotin the Younger at the site of a former grain mill. The first evidence of the mill existence is proven by the oldest watermark dated 1596 - a Zierotin coat of arms depicting a lion with a crown standing on three hills.

Over the centuries the paper mill was in possession of many stationery-manufacturing families and masters.

Throughout the 17th and 18th century the paper mill was a supplier of writing and scratch paper as well as of paperboard.

In 1729, the mill acquired a revolutionary invention - the hollander beater - to prepare paper pulp. It was probably the first device of its kind in Moravia. Despite the efforts of the Zierotin owners to improve and modernize the production process, the paper mill tenant at that time failed to succeed in the competition, especially with paper mills at Šumperk. In 1778 John Louis, the Count of Zierotin, sold the mill to the stationers master Matthias Werner the Younger. Under his ownership the paper mill flourished again.

The boom of the industrial paper production in the mid-19th century Europe put many paper manufactories out of business. In Velké Losiny the production survived thanks to the entrepreneurship of Anton Schmidt older, whose family bought the mill in 1855.

In 1913 the mill was modernized and started using hydroelectric power for its croft, textile and paper production.

Discovery of the excellent filtration properties of the hand-made paper and later the renaissance of its use within the artistic circles allowed the stationery craft in Velké Losiny to survive the difficult economic periods in the 20th century.

In 1949 the paper works were nationalized and became part of the national enterprise Olšanské papírny. In 2006 an independent company Ruční papírna Velké Losiny a.s. was founded.

== Recognition ==
The manufactory is one of the oldest still operating businesses of its kind in Europe. Handmade paper is still produced here from cotton and flax using traditional processes.

It was declared a Czech cultural monument in 1958 and in 2002 it became the national cultural monument. It is also applicant for inclusion on the UNESCO World Heritage Sites list.

In 2007 the Czech National Bank issued a 2500 CZK commemorative gold coin as part of the Industrial Heritage Sites series. The coin was designed by Luboš Charvát.
