= Jindřich František Boblig of Edelstadt =

17th century lawyer involved in Moravian witch trials

Jindřich František Boblig z Edelstadtu (German: Heinrich Franz Boblig von Edelstadt; 1612 – 27 January 1698) was a lawyer and imperial lay inquisitor who led the witch trials in Northern Moravia in the late 17th century.

== Biography ==
Jindřich František was born in 1612 in Zlaté Hory (German: Edelstadt). Little is known about his early life. His father, Burgomaster in Zlaté Hory, was ennobled and received the mark of nobility "z Edelstadtu" (von Edelstadt, of Edelstadt) in 1591.

Jindřich Boblig studied law, probably in Vienna, but he did not complete his studies and later was titled only as juris candidatus. Until his participation in the witch trials of the Šumperk region, he probably led a law practice in Olomouc. He was active in the Šumperk region, particularly in the town of Velké Losiny. Boblig was responsible for burning of approximately 100 people accused of witchcraft. The list of executed included two priests who attempted to stop the trials and Kryštof Lautner, Dean of Šumperk.
