= Sudkov =

- Municipality
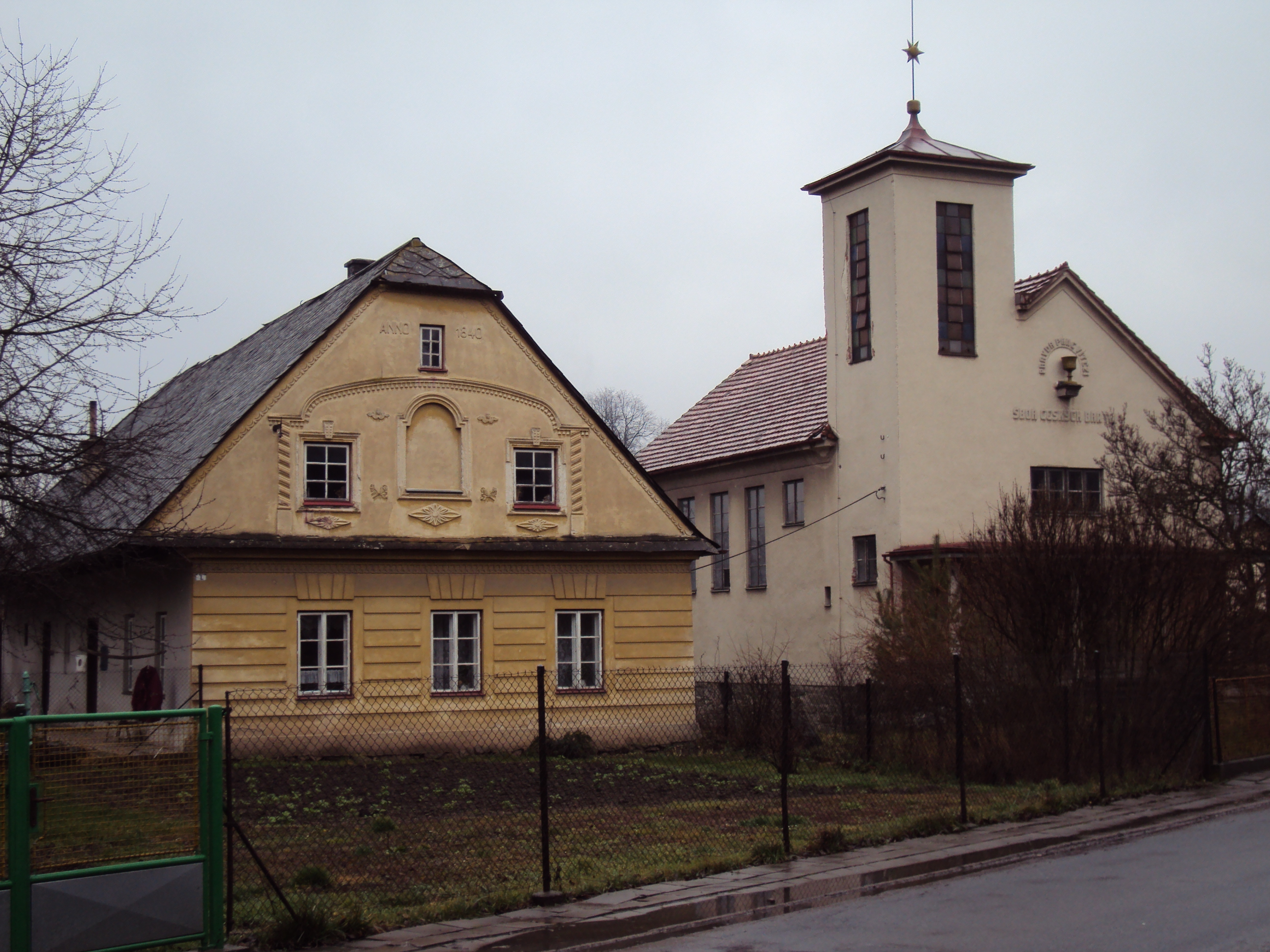
- Protestant church of the Czech Brethren

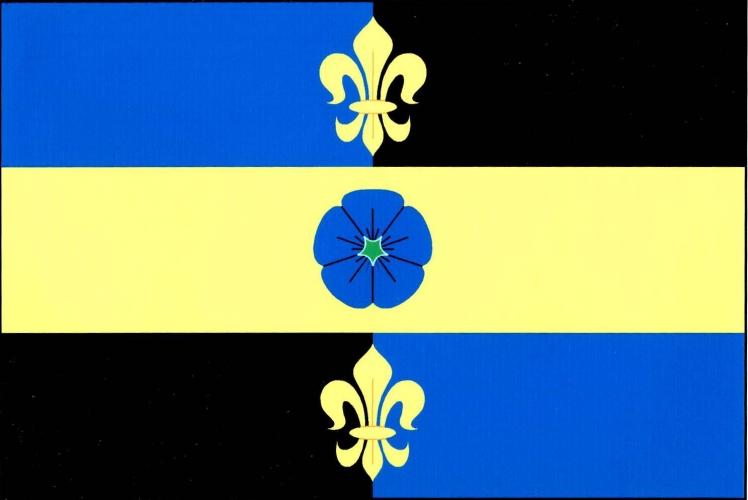
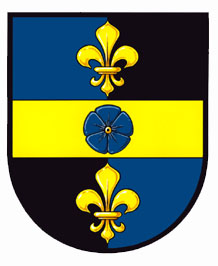
- Flag Coat of arms

- Location in the Czech Republic
- Coordinates: 49°55′9″N 16°56′43″E
- Country: Czech Republic
- Region: Olomouc
- District: Šumperk
- First mentioned: 1353

Area
  - Total: 4.90 km^{2} (1.89 sq mi)
- Elevation: 290 m (950 ft)

Population (2026-01-01)
  - Total: 1,186
  - Density: 242/km^{2} (627/sq mi)
- Time zone: UTC+1 (CET)
  - Summer (DST): UTC+2 (CEST)
- Postal code: 788 21
- Website: www.sudkov.cz

Sudkov (German: Zautke) is a municipality and village in Šumperk District in the Olomouc Region of the Czech Republic. It has about 1,200 inhabitants.

Sudkov lies approximately 6 kilometres (4 mi) south of Šumperk, 43 km (27 mi) north-west of Olomouc, and 182 km (113 mi) east of Prague.

== History ==
The first written mention of Sudkov is from 1353.

== Demographics ==
Historical population
| Year | Pop. | ±% |
|---|---|---|
| 1869 | 703 | — |
| 1880 | 809 | +15.1% |
| 1890 | 963 | +19.0% |
| 1900 | 963 | +0.0% |
| 1910 | 1,409 | +46.3% |
| 1921 | 1,402 | −0.5% |
| 1930 | 1,548 | +10.4% |
| 1950 | 1,172 | −24.3% |
| 1961 | 1,233 | +5.2% |
| 1970 | 1,271 | +3.1% |
| 1980 | 1,325 | +4.2% |
| 1991 | 1,197 | −9.7% |
| 2001 | 1,198 | +0.1% |
| 2011 | 1,150 | −4.0% |
| 2021 | 1,127 | −2.0% |
Source: Censuses
