= Dolní Studénky =

- Municipality
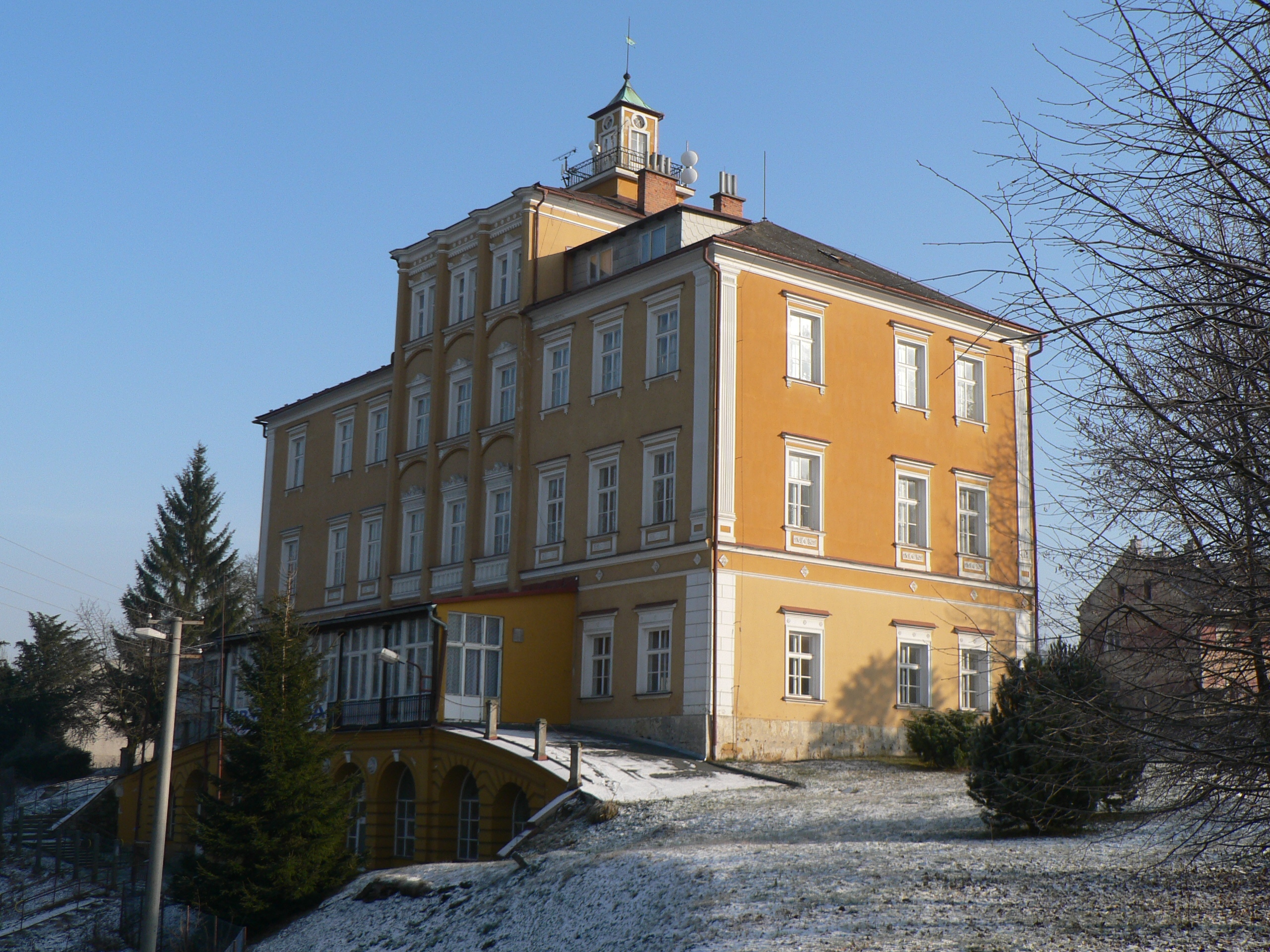
- Třemešek Castle

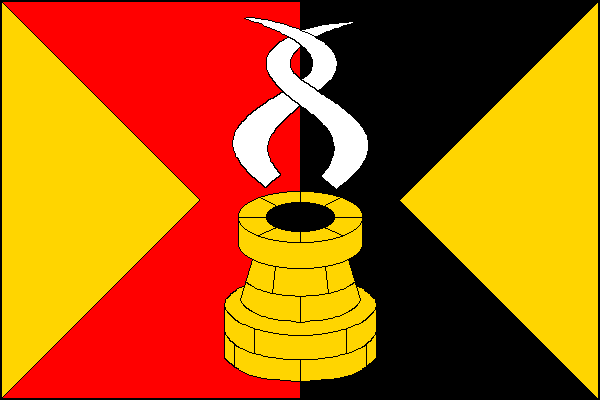
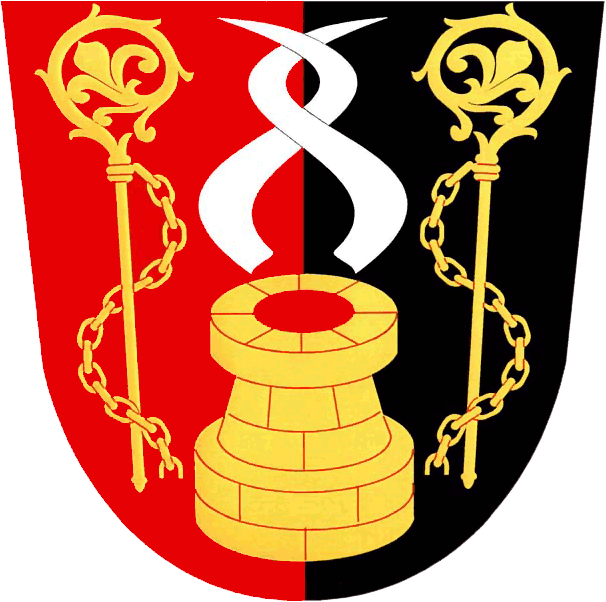
- Flag Coat of arms

- Location in the Czech Republic
- Coordinates: 49°56′6″N 16°58′16″E
- Country: Czech Republic
- Region: Olomouc
- District: Šumperk
- First mentioned: 1353

Area
  - Total: 8.53 km^{2} (3.29 sq mi)
- Elevation: 320 m (1,050 ft)

Population (2026-01-01)
  - Total: 1,425
  - Density: 167/km^{2} (433/sq mi)
- Time zone: UTC+1 (CET)
  - Summer (DST): UTC+2 (CEST)
- Postal code: 788 20
- Website: www.dolnistudenky.cz

Dolní Studénky (German: Schönbrunn) is a municipality and village in Šumperk District in the Olomouc Region of the Czech Republic. It has about 1,400 inhabitants.

== Administrative division ==
Dolní Studénky consists of two municipal parts (in brackets population according to the 2021 census):

- Dolní Studénky (1,001)
- Králec (313)

== Geography ==
Dolní Studénky is located about 4 kilometres (2 mi) south of Šumperk and 43 km (27 mi) northwest of Olomouc. It lies in the Hanušovice Highlands. The highest point is the hill Dražník at 506 m (1,660 ft) above sea level.

== History ==
The first written mention of Dolní Studénky is from 1353, when it was owned by Jan of Kravaře. The history of the village is connected with the village of Třemešek (today a small hamlet within Králec) where the seat of the nobility was located. From 1437 to 1509, it was owned by the Tunkl of Brníčko family, who founded a system of fishponds here. Another notable owners were the Zierotin family, who held it in 1527–1559 and then again in 1653–1771. In 1559–1653, the estate was owned by the Bukůvka family, who had a Renaissance castle built in Třemešek.

The German name of the village, Schönbrunn, was first documented in 1718. After World War II, the German-speaking population was expelled.

== Demographics ==
Historical population

Year	Pop.	±%
1869	842	—
1880	907	+7.7%
1890	969	+6.8%
1900	1,007	+3.9%
1910	1,137	+12.9%

Year	Pop.	±%
1921	1,223	+7.6%
1930	1,330	+8.7%
1950	963	−27.6%
1961	1,257	+30.5%
1970	1,208	−3.9%

Year	Pop.	±%
1980	1,284	+6.3%
1991	1,244	−3.1%
2001	1,276	+2.6%
2011	1,257	−1.5%
2021	1,314	+4.5%

Source: Censuses

== Culture ==
The annual international brass music festival Hudba bez hranic ("Music Without Borders") takes place in Dolní Studénky. It was founded in 2005.

== Transport ==
The I/44 road (the section from Šumperk to Zábřeh) runs through the western part of the municipality.

== Sights ==
The most valuable building is the Třemešek Castle. The originally Renaissance castle from the 1580s was rebuilt in the Neoclassical style in the mid-19th century. Today, it serves the Centre for Social Services, which operates a cafe and apartments for the disabled.
