= Elo Romančík =

Slovak actor (1922–2012)

- Born: Emanuel Romančík; 17 December 1922; Ružomberok, Czechoslovakia
- Died: 9 October 2012 (aged 89); Bratislava, Slovakia
- Occupation: Actor
- Years active: 1950–2002

Emanuel "Elo" Romančík (17 December 1922 in Ružomberok – 9 October 2012 in Bratislava) was a Slovak actor. He starred in the 1970 film Witchhammer under director Otakar Vávra.

== Selected filmography ==
- 1951 Boj se skončí zítra (Jakub)
- 1953 Pole neorané (Pavel Húščava)
- 1953 Rodná zem (Jurek)
- 1956 Prověrka lásky (Juraj Horálik)
- 1957 Dovidenia Lucienne
- 1959 Dům na rozcestí (MUDr. Juraj Belan)
- 1959 Kapitán Dabač (Pavol Garaj)
- 1960 Na pochodu se vždy nezpívá (Martin Gonda)
- 1960 Tři tuny prachu (Spára)
- 1961 Králíci ve vysoké trávě (otec)
- 1961 Pokořené řeky (Ján Kolesár)
- 1962 Půlnoční mše (dr. Harman)
- 1967 Volání démonov (ředitel Černek)
- 1970 Witchhammer (Lautner)
- 1973 Dolina (leutnant)
- 1975 Tetované časem (Popelár)
- 1975 Život na útěku (mjr. Zvara)
- 1977 Kamarádka Šuška (Hronec)
- 1978 Poéma o svědomí (Borovský)
- 1979 Smrt šitá na míru (biskup)
- 1981 Pomocník (Štefan Riečan)
- 1985 Skleníková Venuše (prof. Čajovec)
- 1986 Šestá věta (Slančík)
