= Velké Losiny =

- Municipality
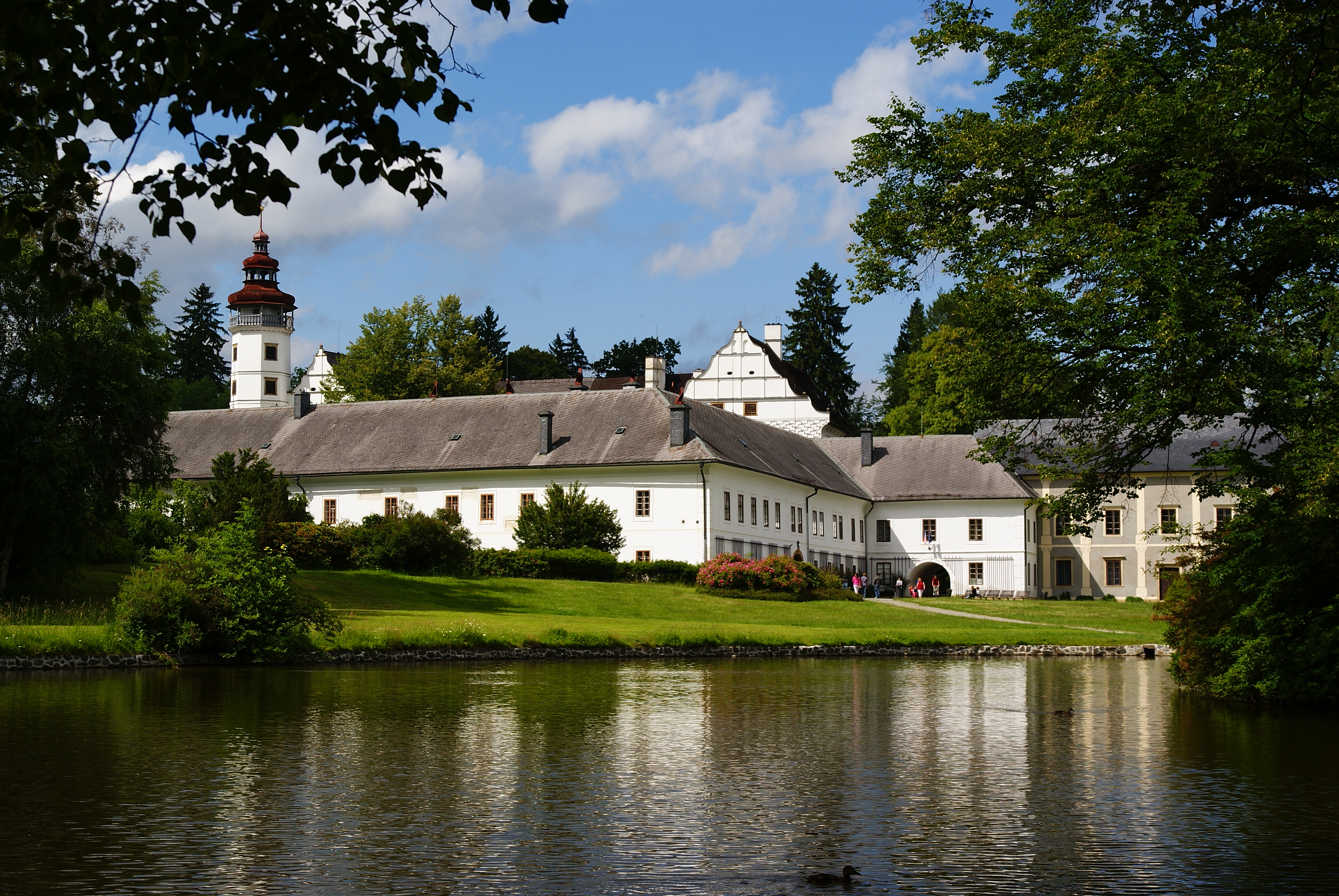
- Velké Losiny Castle

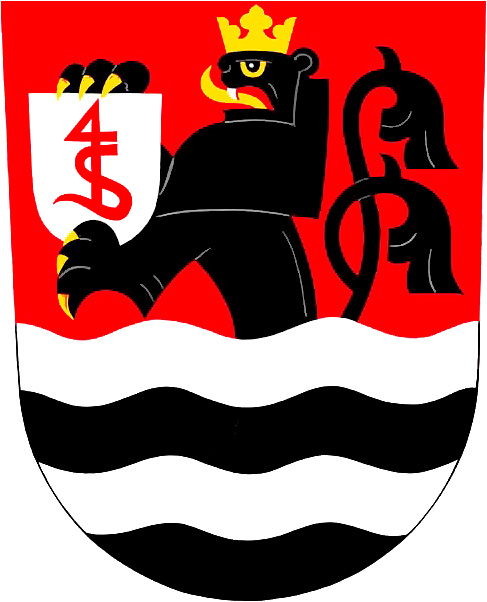
- Flag Coat of arms

- Location in the Czech Republic
- Coordinates: 50°1′55″N 17°2′26″E
- Country: Czech Republic
- Region: Olomouc
- District: Šumperk
- First mentioned: 1296

Area
  - Total: 46.50 km^{2} (17.95 sq mi)
- Elevation: 406 m (1,332 ft)

Population (2026-01-01)
  - Total: 2,460
  - Density: 52.9/km^{2} (137/sq mi)
- Time zone: UTC+1 (CET)
  - Summer (DST): UTC+2 (CEST)
- Postal code: 788 15
- Website: www.losiny.cz

Velké Losiny (Czech pronunciation: [ˈvɛlkɛː ˈlosɪnɪ]; German: Groß Ullersdorf) is a spa municipality and village in Šumperk District in the Olomouc Region of the Czech Republic. It has about 2,500 inhabitants. The municipality is located on the Losinka Stream in the Hanušovice Highlands.

Velké Losiny was founded in the 13th century at the latest. The municipality is known for the Velké Losiny Castle and for the Paper Mill at Velké Losiny, which are protected as national cultural monuments.

== Administrative division ==
Velké Losiny consists of five municipal parts (in brackets population according to the 2021 census):

- Velké Losiny (2,077)
- Bukovice (79)
- Ludvíkov (35)
- Maršíkov (170)
- Žárová (117)

== Geography ==
Velké Losiny is located about 8 kilometres (5 mi) northeast of Šumperk and 50 km (31 mi) north of Olomouc. It lies mostly in the Hanušovice Highlands. A small part of the municipal territory in the east extends into the Hrubý Jeseník mountains. The highest point is the hill Bukový vrch at 771 m (2,530 ft) above sea level. The village is located in the valley of the Losinka Stream.

== History ==
The first written mention of Velké Losiny is from 1296. The most notable owners were the Zierotin family, who acquired it in the second half of the 15th century and held it more than 300 years. The family had rebuilt the local fortress into a castle, had built new church and founded here a spa and a paper mill.

In 1678–1692, Velké Losiny was the centre of the most infamous witch trials in the nowadays Czech Republic. They were conducted by Heinrich Franz Boblig von Edelstadt, who was summoned to Velké Losiny by Countess Galle and eventually stopped by the brothers Joachim and Maximilian of Zierotin.

At the end of the 18th century, the Zierotins fell into debt and began selling their estates. In 1802, they had to sell Velké Losiny with the castle to the Liechtenstein family, in whose possession it remained until 1945.

== Demographics ==
Historical population

Year	Pop.	±%
1869	4,326	—
1880	4,182	−3.3%
1890	4,176	−0.1%
1900	3,974	−4.8%
1910	4,135	+4.1%

Year	Pop.	±%
1921	4,065	−1.7%
1930	4,262	+4.8%
1950	2,683	−37.0%
1961	2,800	+4.4%
1970	2,914	+4.1%

Year	Pop.	±%
1980	3,085	+5.9%
1991	2,958	−4.1%
2001	2,889	−2.3%
2011	2,641	−8.6%
2021	2,478	−6.2%

Source: Censuses

== Transport ==
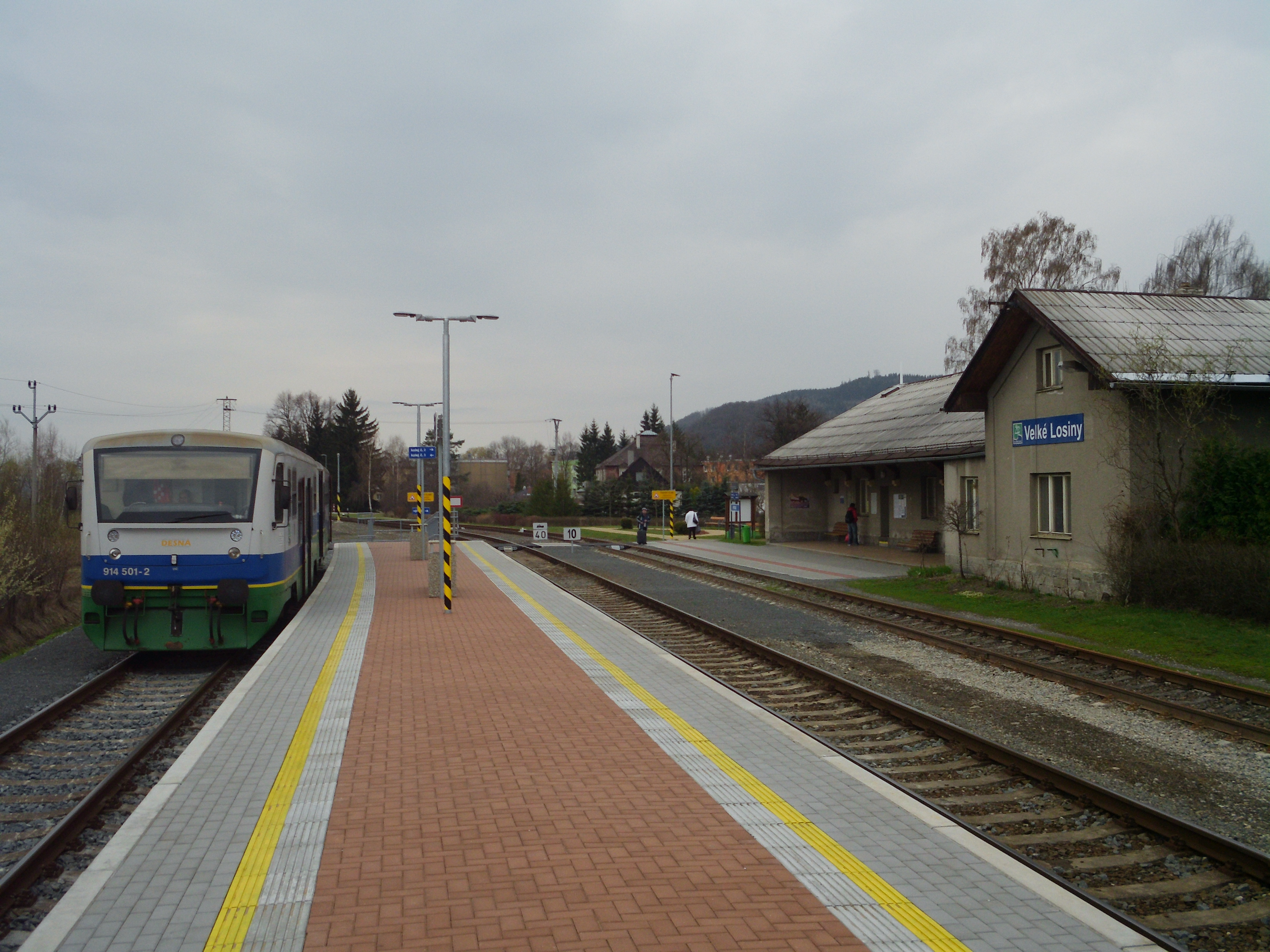
Velké Losiny station

Velké Losiny is located on the railway line from Nezamyslice to Kouty nad Desnou via Prostějov, Olomouc and Šumperk. There are four train stations and stops in the municipal territory, including Loučná n.Desnou-Filipová, which serves the neighbouring municipality of Loučná nad Desnou.

== Sights ==
The most significant monuments are the castle and the handmade paper mill, which is the oldest in Europe. Notable is also the late Renaissance Church of Saint John the Baptist, built in 1599–1603. A popular tourist destination is the local thermal spa and its thermal water park called Termály Losiny.

=== Castle ===
The castle was built by Jan the Younger of Zierotin approximately in 1567–1589, on the site of an earlier Gothic fortress. The castle consists of three wings overlooking the courtyard with three floors of arcade galleries and is crowned by a narrow octagonal tower. At the turn of the 18th century, the Renaissance buildings were extended with a further three, also arcaded, Baroque-style wings, to which a Baroque-style garden featuring romantic little structures and statues was added.

From 1945, the castle is owned by the state. It is protected as a national cultural monument and is open to the public. The most valuable element of the castle interiors is the knight's hall with a Renaissance coffered ceiling. Notable are the castle chapel, decorated with frescoes by Johann Christoph Handke, and the castle gallery with paintings of the most important European painting schools.

=== Spa and water park ===
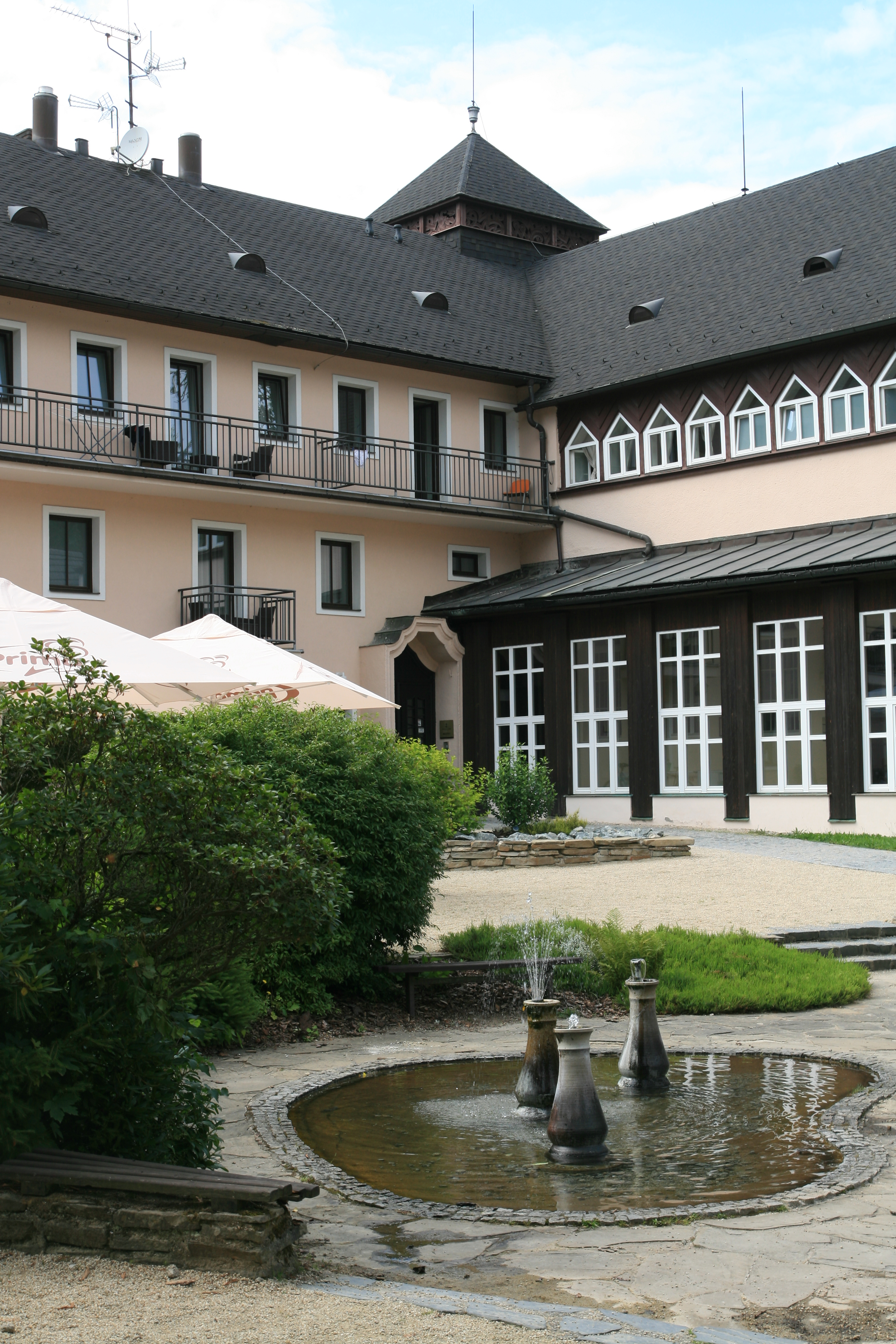
Eliška spring

Velké Losiny is a minor spa municipality with one of the oldest spas in Moravia. The spa was founded in 1562 by Jan the Younger of Zierotin, and a wooden spa building was built here in 1592. The sulfur curative thermal water pumped from a depth of 1,200 metres (3,900 ft) underground reaches temperatures up to 37 °C. The spa buildings are today situated within a park created in 1861, which contains rare trees, rhododendrons and azaleas.

The spa specialises in treating mobility disorders and neurological and skin diseases.

The spa water park is one of the most visited tourist destinations in the Olomouc Region. The main attraction of the park is four outdoor pools and five indoor pools filled with natural thermal water. They are the only such pools in the country.

=== Paper mill ===
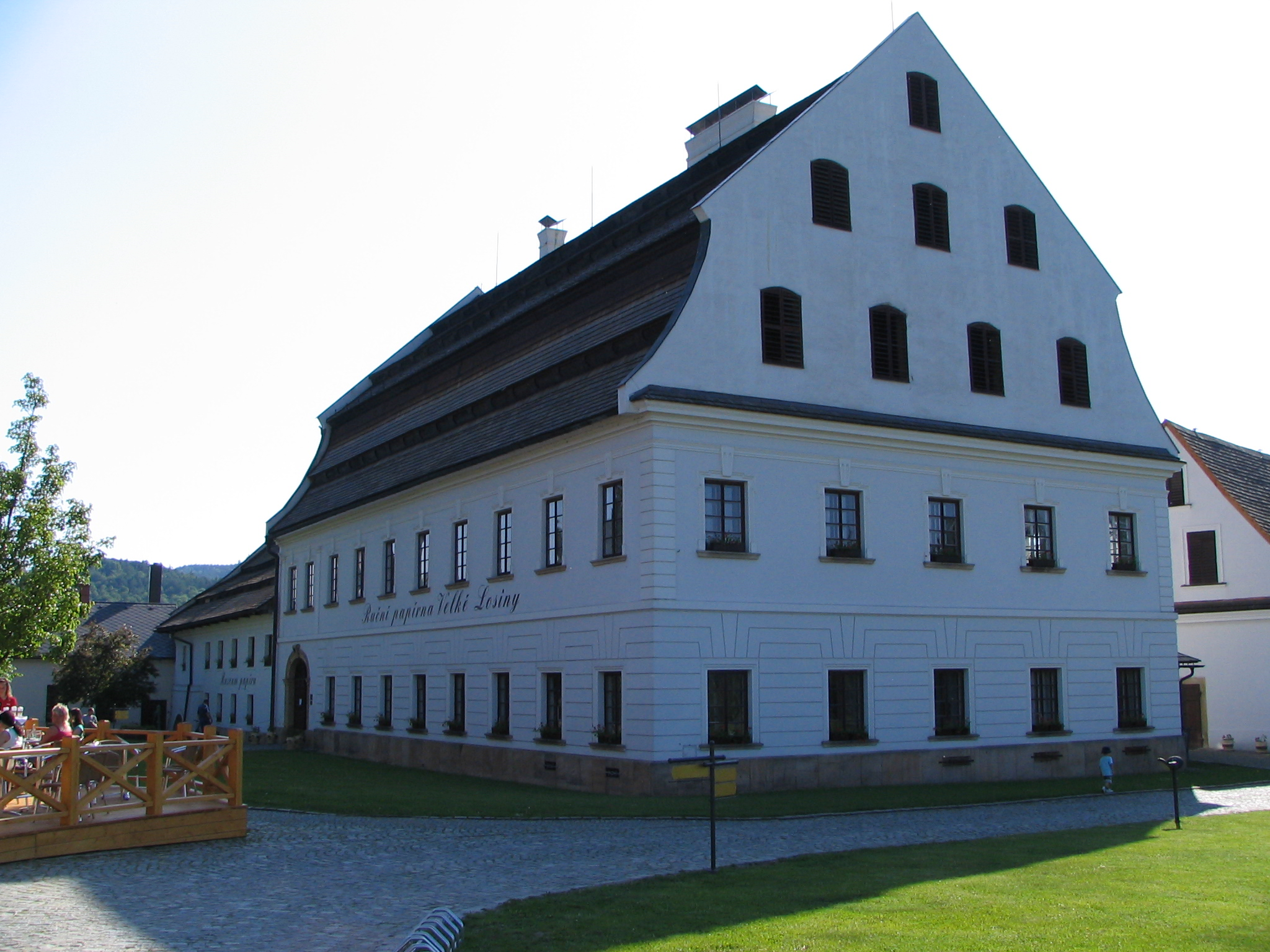
Paper Mill at Velké Losiny

The distinguishing feature of the municipality is an old handmade paper mill. It is a national cultural monument and an applicant for inclusion on the UNESCO World Heritage Sites list.

It was established by the Zierotins between 1591 and 1596 but only produced real wealth in the second half of the 19th century. At the turn of the 18th and 19th centuries, the set of buildings acquired its present-day late Baroque and Neoclassical appearance. Not only it is one of the oldest paper mills in Europe, but it has also been in continuous operation since it was founded.

Since 1987, the factory houses the Museum of the Paper, which is the only one of its kind in the country. It presents the history of paper-making from the use of the old traditional techniques right up to the deployment of modern industrial technologies.

== Notable people ==
- Milan Horáček (born 1946), German politician
