= Václav Kaplický =

Czech writer and poet (1895–1982)

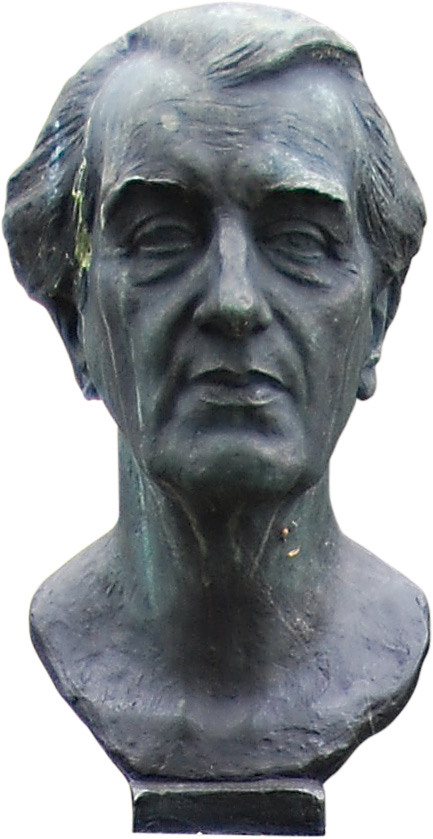
Bust of writer by sculptor Břetislav Benda

Václav Kaplický (28 August 1895, Sezimovo Ústí – 4 October 1982, Prague) was a Czech writer, journalist and epic poet. He is best known as an author of historical fiction. Kaplický studied at Gymnasium in Tábor, finishing in 1914. In 1915 he was sent to the front in Galicia, where he was captured and became a prisoner of war the following year. Later he joined the Czechoslovak Legion. For his political opinions he was imprisoned by the legion and labeled a traitor. After returning to Czechoslovakia in 1921, he worked in civil service. From 1922 to 1950, Kaplický worked in several publishing houses associated with the Czechoslovak Socialist Party. From 1950 he dedicated his time solely to writing.

The majority of Kaplický's works are historical fiction spanning the period from the Hussite Wars in the 15th century to the revolutionary upheaval of 1848. His novel Kladivo na čarodějnice (1963), about witch trials in northern Moravia during the 1670s, is the best known because it served as the basis for a film by Otakar Vávra, Malleus Maleficarum (also translated as Witches' Hammer or Witchhammer).

== Works ==
=== Historical fiction ===
- Kraj kalicha (English: The Region of the Chalice), 1945 – about the Hussite period
- Čtveráci (English: Fours), 1952 – about a peasant uprising in 1618–1620
- Železná koruna (English: Iron Crown) (2 volumes), 1954 – about the hard life of common people after the Thirty Years' War
- Smršť (English: Whirlwind), 1955
- Rekruti (English: Recruits), 1956
- Listy z kronik (English: Leaves from Chronicles), 1958 – five historical short stories from northern Bohemia
- Zaťatá pěst (English: Clenched Fist), 1959
- Kladivo na čarodějnice (English: Witch Hammer), 1963 – about witch trials in northern Moravia, translated by John A. Newton, published by Harbinger House, 1990. <https://openlibrary.org/publishers/Harbinger_House>
- Táborská republika (3 volumes), 1969 – about the Hussite period
- Nalezeno právem (English: Found By Right), 1971 – about the accusation of a Jew performing ritual murder in 1687
- Škůdce zemský Jiří Kopidlanský, 1976 – from the period of the dynasty of Jagellon
- Veliké theatrum (English: Great Theater), 1977 – about the earliest phase of the Thirty Years' War and preparations for the Battle of White Mountain
- Kdo s koho, 1979 – from the period of the dynasty of Jagellon
- Život alchymistův (English: The Life of an Alchemist), 1980 – the life of alchemist Edward Kelley

=== For youth ===
- O věrnosti a zradě (English: On Loyalty and Betrayal), 1959 – 15 short historical stories
- Bandita, Paťara a spol., 1969 – for boys
- Královský souboj (English: Royal Battle), 1971

=== Other works ===
- Gornostaj, finished in 1921, published in 1936 – an autobiographical novel about the imprisonment of dissenting legionnaires near Vladivostok on an island in Gornostai Bay (ru:)
- Dobří přátelé (English: Good Friends), 1961 – about love of nature
- Ani tygři, ani lvi (English: Neither Tigers Nor Lions), 1966 – short stories about pet animals
- Od města k městu (English: From City to City), 1975 – wandering of students throughout Czech lands
- Hrst vzpomínek z mládí (English: A Handful of Memories From My Youth), 1988 – the first part of Kaplický's memoirs, edited by Jaromíra Nejedlá
- Hrst vzpomínek z dospělosti (English: A Handful of Memories From Adulthood), 2010 – the second part of Kaplický's memoirs, edited by Martin Kučera
