= Loučná nad Desnou =

- Municipality
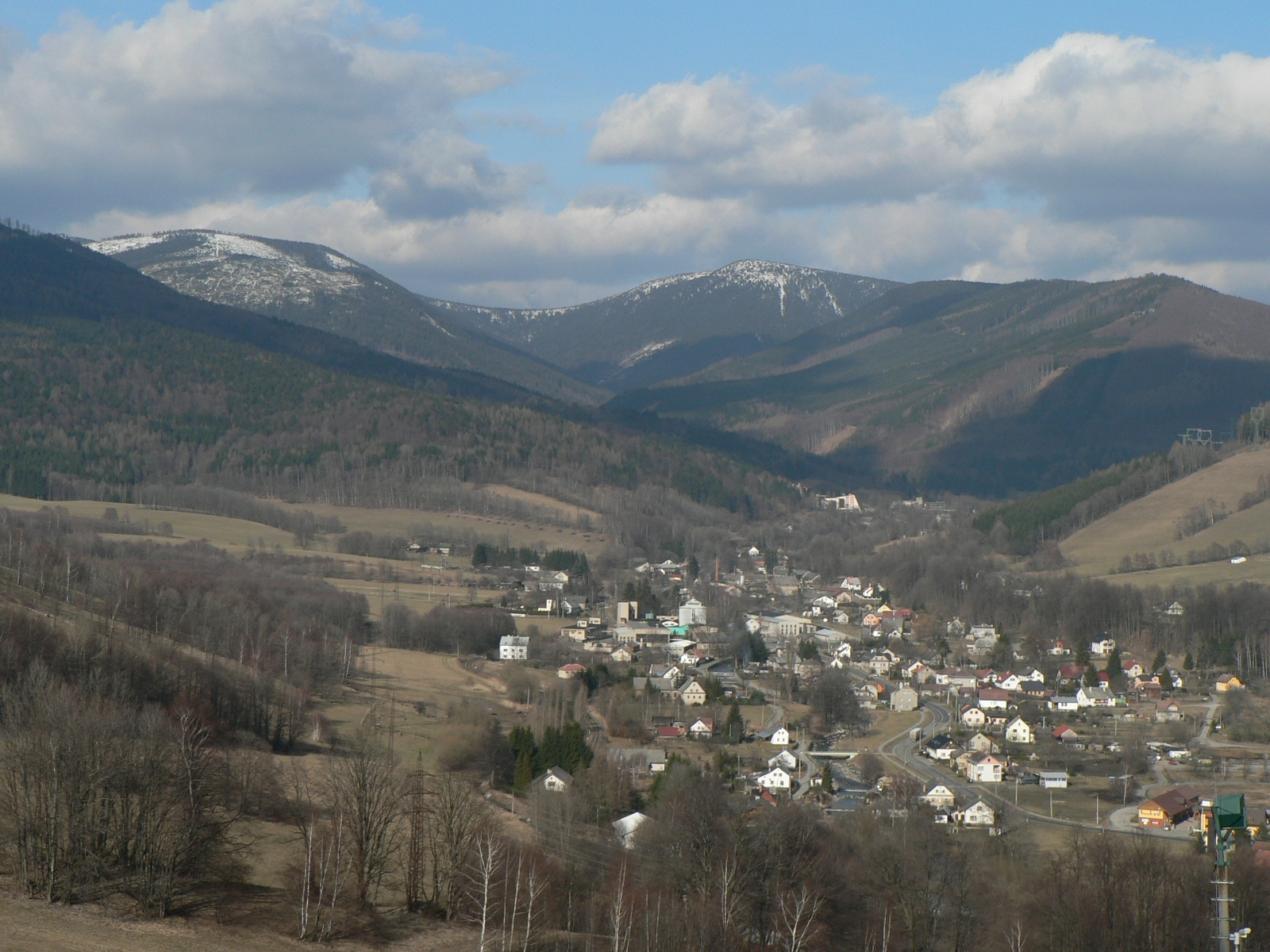
- Upper part of Loučná nad Desnou

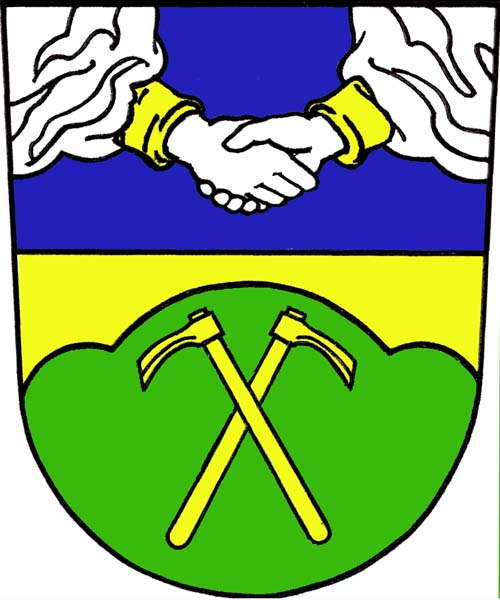
- Flag Coat of arms

- Location in the Czech Republic
- Coordinates: 50°4′18″N 17°5′28″E
- Country: Czech Republic
- Region: Olomouc
- District: Šumperk
- First mentioned: 1494

Area
  - Total: 94.34 km^{2} (36.42 sq mi)
- Elevation: 450 m (1,480 ft)

Population (2026-01-01)
  - Total: 1,409
  - Density: 14.94/km^{2} (38.68/sq mi)
- Time zone: UTC+1 (CET)
  - Summer (DST): UTC+2 (CEST)
- Postal code: 788 11
- Website: www.loucna-nad-desnou.cz

Loučná nad Desnou (until 1948 Vízmberk; German: Wiesenberg) is a municipality and village in Šumperk District in the Olomouc Region of the Czech Republic. It has about 1,400 inhabitants.

== Administrative division ==
Loučná nad Desnou consists of six municipal parts (in brackets population according to the 2021 census):

- Loučná nad Desnou (482)
- Filipová (174)
- Kociánov (268)
- Kouty nad Desnou (98)
- Přemyslov (19)
- Rejhotice (359)

== Geography ==
Loučná nad Desnou is located about 14 kilometres (9 mi) northeast of Šumperk and 54 km (34 mi) north of Olomouc. It lies in the Hrubý Jeseník mountain range in the valley of the Desná River, which originates in the municipal territory. The highest point of Loučná nad Desnou and the highest mountain of the entire historical land of Moravia is Praděd at 1,491 m (4,892 ft) above sea level. The Dlouhé stráně Reservoir is located in the eastern part of the municipality.

== History ==
The oldest part of the municipality is the village of Rejhotice. The first written mention of Rejhotice is from 1494, but it was probably founded in the 14th century by lumbermen and charcoal burners. The area belonged to the Šumperk estate, owned by the Zierotin family. After 1608, the Wiesenberg (later Vízmberk) estate was established by Jan the Younger of Zierotin, and the construction of the castle began.

In 1651, Přemysl II of Zierotin invited new settlers and founded the village of Přemyslov. In the second half of the 17th century, the area was hit by the infamous Northern Moravia witch trials and one woman from Rejhotice was killed. The village of Kociánov was established in 1784. The hamlet of Vízmberk, formed by houses around the Vízmberk Castle, established a separate village in 1799.

In 1948, the municipality of Vízmberk was renamed Loučná. Since 1953, it has been known as Loučná pod Desnou.

== Demographics ==
Historical population

Year	Pop.	±%
1869	3,454	—
1880	3,653	+5.8%
1890	3,445	−5.7%
1900	3,540	+2.8%
1910	3,422	−3.3%

Year	Pop.	±%
1921	3,009	−12.1%
1930	2,839	−5.6%
1950	1,778	−37.4%
1961	1,819	+2.3%
1970	1,644	−9.6%

Year	Pop.	±%
1980	1,813	+10.3%
1991	1,813	+0.0%
2001	1,933	+6.6%
2011	1,622	−16.1%
2021	1,400	−13.7%

Source: Censuses

== Transport ==
Loučná nad Desnou is the start and terminus of the railway line from Nezamyslice to Kouty nad Desnou via Prostějov, Olomouc and Šumperk. There are three train stations and stops in the municipal territory, excluding Loučná n.Desnou-Filipová, which serves Filipová, but is located in the neighbouring municipality of Velké Losiny.

== Sights ==
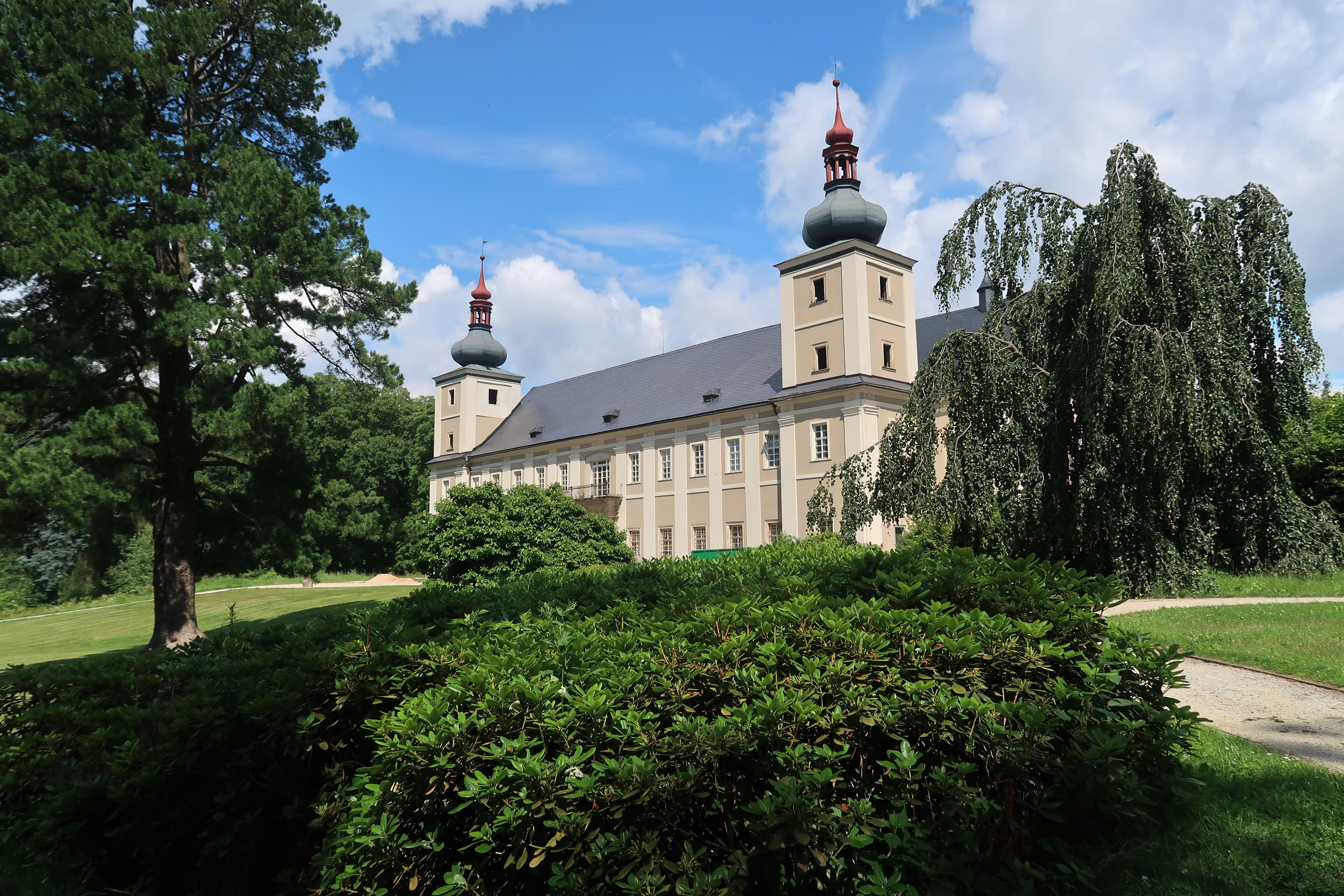
Loučná nad Desnou Castle

The main landmark is the Loučná nad Desnou Castle (formerly Vízmburk Castle). The castle was built by the Zierotins on the site of an old wooden hunting lodge. The castle park also dates from the 17th century. In 1839–1945, the park was redesigned to an English-style park. Today the castle is unused and inaccessible, but the park is freely accessible.

== Notable people ==
- Alfred Brendel (1931–2025), Austrian pianist

== Twin towns – sister cities ==
Loučná nad Desnou is twinned with:

- Sośnicowice, Poland
