= Northern Moravia witch trials =

17th-century Czech witch trials

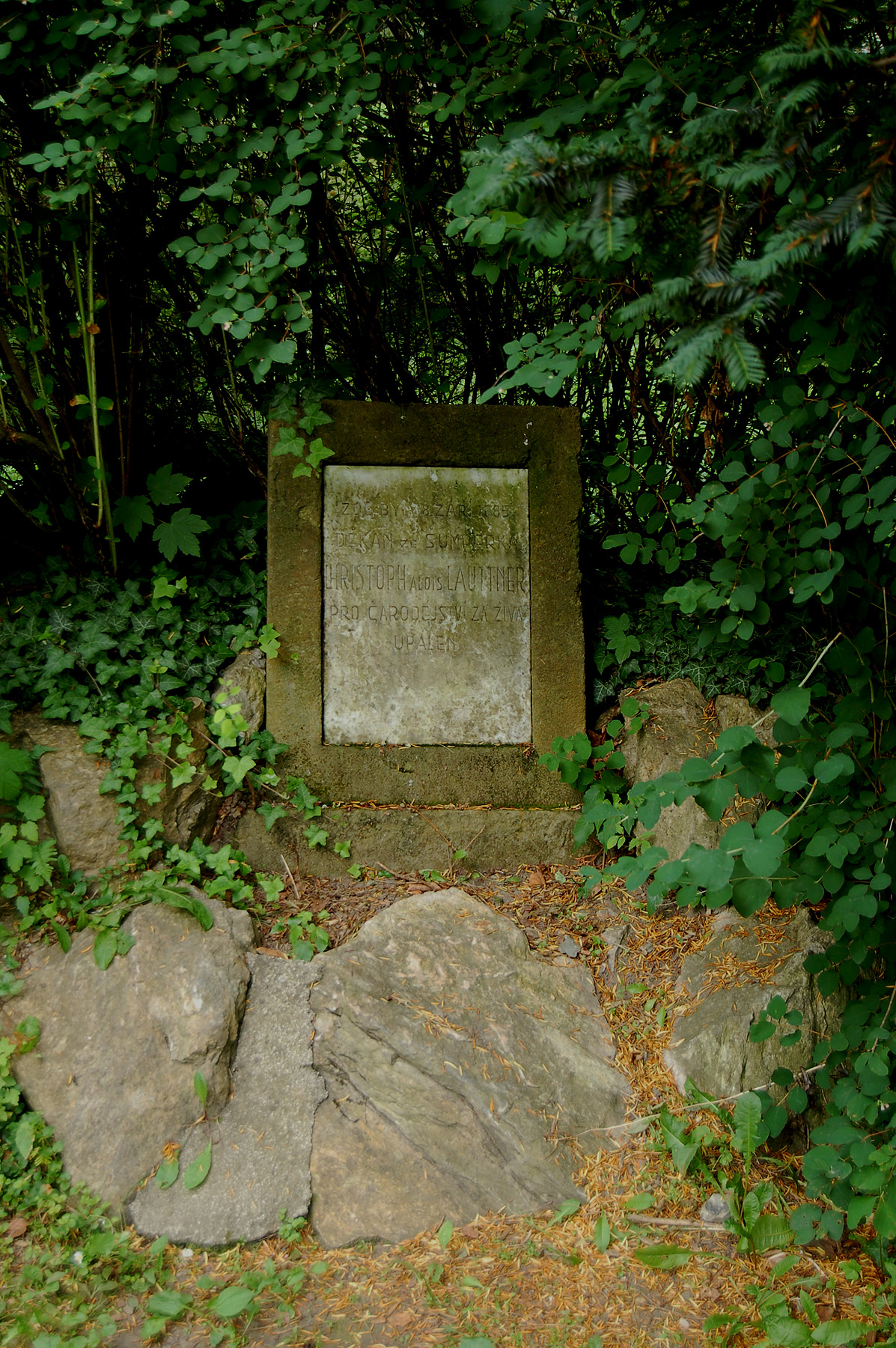
Memorial to Christoph Lautner, a victim of the trials. The memorial is situated in Mohelnice, in the place where he was executed.

The Northern Moravia witch trials, also known as Boblig witch trials, occurred in the Jeseník (Freiwaldau) and Šumperk (Mährisch Schönberg) area in the present-day Czech Republic, between 1622 and 1696. They are among the largest and best-known Czech witch trials.

== Background ==
The Northern Moravian witch trials are considered to be part of the Catholic Counter-Reformation. The Czechs were unwilling to abandon their Protestant religion after Bohemian lands had been re-taken by Austria during the Thirty Years' War. There was also great opposition to the social oppression of farmers under the landlords. This caused rebellions, such as the one of 1659–1662 led by Christoph Winter, Nikolaus Patzold and Jan Jaschke.

Jesuit priest Arnold Engel was the first person who had pointed out to the alleged witch practices in North Moravia. In order to draw attention of Emperor Leopold I, he wrote a special memorandum describing alleged public mocking of Catholics by Protestants. In his pamphlet, Engel refers also to the "flourishing of the art of witchcraft and evil". He notes, that "... so many dead men, who didn't die in good faith, but had connections with the devil, are getting up from their graves, and cause heavy damages to both the residents and their livestock."

Witch trials were otherwise uncommon in Bohemia and Moravia. The first witch trials occurred in Jeseník in 1622, when 4 women were executed. In 1636, the first great hunt erupted and lasted until 1648; the number executed has been lost, but is considered to have been great. In 1651, 86 people were executed for witchcraft. 250 people are estimated to have been executed for this charge in the first period of 1622–1651. In 1667, another 16 were burned in Ratibor. They occurred mainly in present-day Silesia and the Principality of Nisa.

== The trials ==
At Easter 1678, Marie Schuhe from Vernířovice (Wermsdorf) attended church, and during the mass, she was observed taking the bread of communion from her mouth into her prayer book. This was the starting point of the witch trials. The local aristocrat, Countess Angelia Anna Sibyla of Galle, was advised to form a witch commission. Retired inquisition judge Heinrich Franz Boblig von Edelstadt was recommended as the judge and head of the commission. Boblig was to become a well known witch hunter.

The countess did not initially approve of torture. By displaying the torture devices for Schuhe, she pointed out the midwife Dorota Grör, who, in her turn, pointed out Dorota Davidová, who had wanted the communion to use for a spell which would give the cows more milk. Boblig now convinced the countess that torture was necessary, and after this, torture was much used. The accused were stripped, the Devil's mark were searched for.

In 1679, Marie Schuhe and three other women were burned at the stake; one, Davidová, had died in prison but her corpse was burned all the same.

Boblig and his commission continued his work, and was rumored to be driven by economic reasons. He turned to the town of Šumperk, where many wealthy families lived. Caspar Sattler and his wife Marie were among those found guilty by him.

== The trial of Lautner ==
In February 1680, five women were decapitated and burned. Usually, those convicted by Boblig were sentenced execution by burning. In Velké Losiny (Gross Ullersdorf) Marie Sattler was pointed out by some of them. When four women were burned in September 1680, the crowd watching the execution cried for Jesus to forgive them. This made an impression on the priest Thomas König. Together with other priests, he protested against Boblig, saying that if the commission were allowed to continue, then soon no one could be certain of their lives. Boblig reacted with gathering incriminating material against the critics which would suggest that they were witches as well. König died in 1682, just avoiding an arrest, as Boblig was ready to present his witch charge against him.

Another of the critics was Christoph Alois Lautner, vicar of Šumperk and a popular person because of his tolerance. The Sattler family belonged to the most known accused people of these trials. They had come into an argument with members of the commission. Boblig had long planned to have them accused so that he could confiscate their property. An already arrested person was made to implicate them.

Caspar Sattler, his wife Marie and daughter Lizl were arrested and tortured. They were made to implicate Suzanne Voglick, the house keeper and mistress of Lautner. The accused were made to confess to have committed incest and sex with demons at the witches' sabbath. They implicated Lautner, who was arrested as well with permission from the bishop. Lautner, Voglick and the Sattler family were burned at the stake in 1685.

The persecutions continued for eighteen years, until the death of Boblig in 1696. About one hundred people are estimated to have been executed in the 1678–1696 witch craze.

== See also ==
- Modern witch-hunts

== In fiction ==
Otakar Vávra's film Kladivo na čarodějnice (Malleus Maleficarum, also translated as Witches' Hammer or Witchhammer, 1969) is based on Václav Kaplický's book Kladivo na čarodějnice (1963), a novel about witch trials in Northern Moravia during the 1670s.
