= Bludov =

Bludov may refer to:

== Places in the Czech Republic ==
- Bludov (Kutná Hora District), a municipality and village in the Central Bohemian Region
- Bludov (Šumperk District), a municipality and village in the Olomouc Region
  - Bludov Castle
  - Bludov Chateau

== People ==
- Dmitry Bludov, Russian politician
