= České Heřmanice =

- Market town
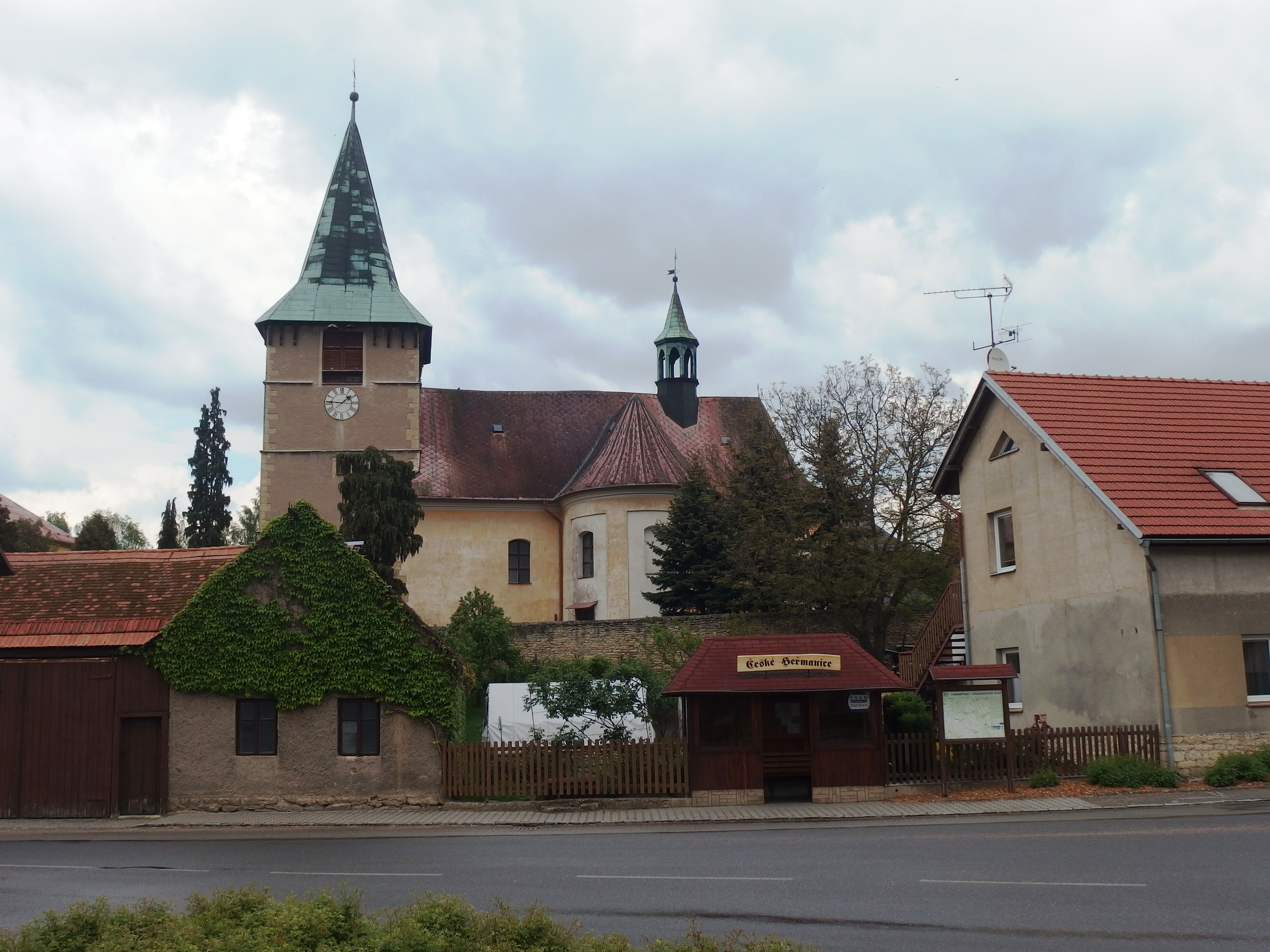
- Church of Saint James the Great

- Flag Coat of arms

- Location in the Czech Republic
- Coordinates: 49°55′53″N 16°15′11″E
- Country: Czech Republic
- Region: Pardubice
- District: Ústí nad Orlicí
- First mentioned: 1226

Area
  - Total: 9.97 km^{2} (3.85 sq mi)
- Elevation: 309 m (1,014 ft)

Population (2026-01-01)
  - Total: 606
  - Density: 60.8/km^{2} (157/sq mi)
- Time zone: UTC+1 (CET)
  - Summer (DST): UTC+2 (CEST)
- Postal code: 565 52
- Website: www.ceskehermanice.cz

České Heřmanice (Czech pronunciation: [ˈtʃɛskɛː ˈɦɛr̝maɲɪtsɛ] German: Böhmisch Hermanitz) is a market town in Ústí nad Orlicí District in the Pardubice Region of the Czech Republic. It has about 600 inhabitants.

== Administrative division ==
České Heřmanice consists of four municipal parts (in brackets population according to the 2021 census):

- České Heřmanice (414)
- Borová (28)
- Chotěšiny (75)
- Netřeby (82)

== Etymology ==
The initial name of the village was Švábenice. The name was derived from the surname Šváben, meaning "the village of Šváben's people". Already in 1226, it was renamed Heřmanice after the provost Heřman of the Litomyšl Chapter. In the 18th century, the village was renamed České Heřmanice ('Bohemian Heřmanice') to distinguish it from the nearby village with the same name (today known as Horní Heřmanice).

== Geography ==
České Heřmanice is located about 11 kilometres (7 mi) east of Ústí nad Orlicí and 35 km (22 mi) east of Pardubice. It lies in the Svitavy Uplands. The highest point is at 377 m (1,237 ft) above sea level. The stream Sloupnický potok flows through the market town. The territory of České Heřmanice is rich in fishponds.

== History ==
The first written mention of České Heřmanice is from 1226. The greatest prosperity occurred during the rule of Bohuněk of Adršpach in 1460–1506. During this period, České Heřmanice was promoted to a market town. Among the next owners of the market town were the noble families of Kostka of Postupice, Zierotin, Trauttmansdorff, Waldstein and Thurn und Taxis.

The first written mention of Chotěšiny is from 1307. It was a separate municipality until 1960, when it was merged with České Heřmanice.

Netřeby was founded in 1661 and Borová was founded in 1698. From 1785, they were administered as parts of České Heřmanice.

== Demographics ==
Historical population

Year	Pop.	±%
1869	1,013	—
1880	1,015	+0.2%
1890	994	−2.1%
1900	935	−5.9%
1910	965	+3.2%

Year	Pop.	±%
1921	942	−2.4%
1930	870	−7.6%
1950	687	−21.0%
1961	644	−6.3%
1970	579	−10.1%

Year	Pop.	±%
1980	500	−13.6%
1991	533	+6.6%
2001	532	−0.2%
2011	533	+0.2%
2021	599	+12.4%

Source: Censuses

== Transport ==
There are no railways or major roads passing through the municipality.

== Sights ==
The main landmark of České Heřmanice is the Church of Saint James the Great. It was built in 1547 and the tower from this period has been preserved to this day. In 1720–1733, the church was completely rebuilt in the Baroque style.
