= Horní Heřmanice =

Horní Heřmanice may refer to places in the Czech Republic:

- Horní Heřmanice (Třebíč District), a municipality and village in the Vysočina Region
- Horní Heřmanice (Ústí nad Orlicí District), a municipality and village in the Pardubice Region
- Horní Heřmanice, a village and part of Bernartice (Jeseník District) in the Olomouc Region
