= Bludoveček =

Coordinates: 49°57′15.25″N 16°56′23.37″E

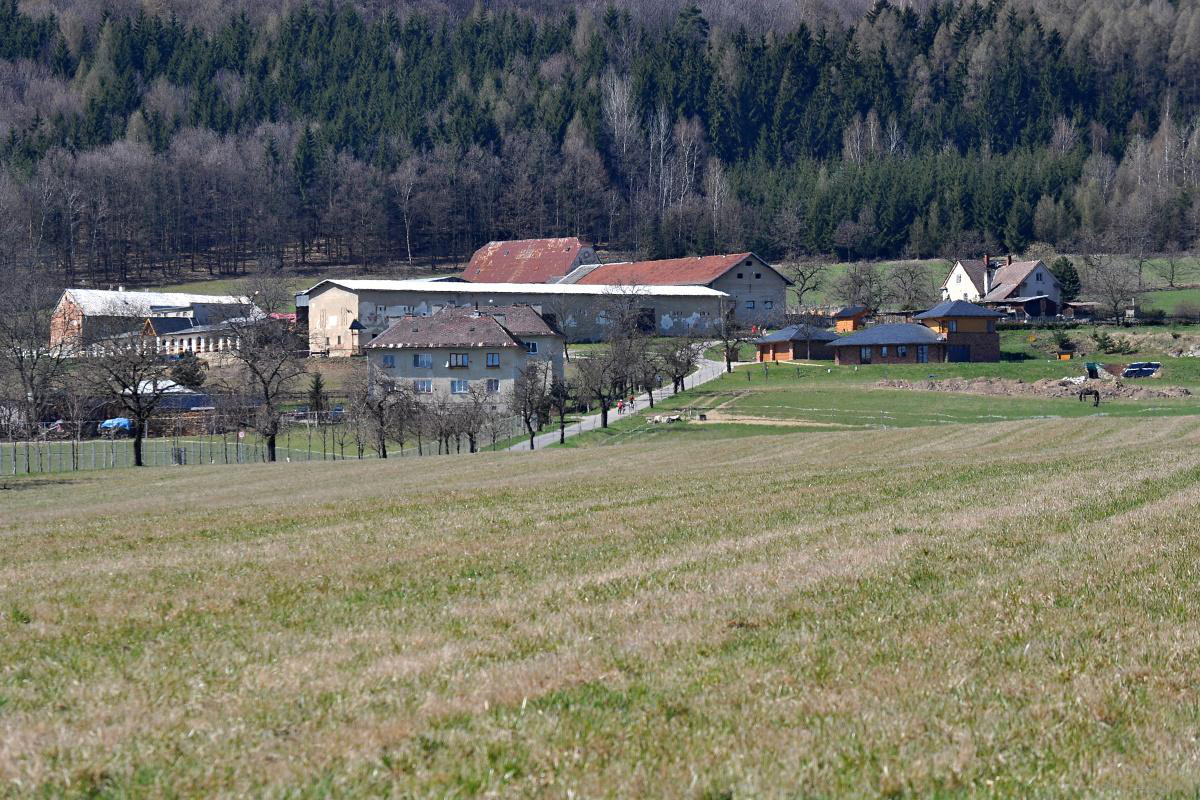
Overview of Bludoveček

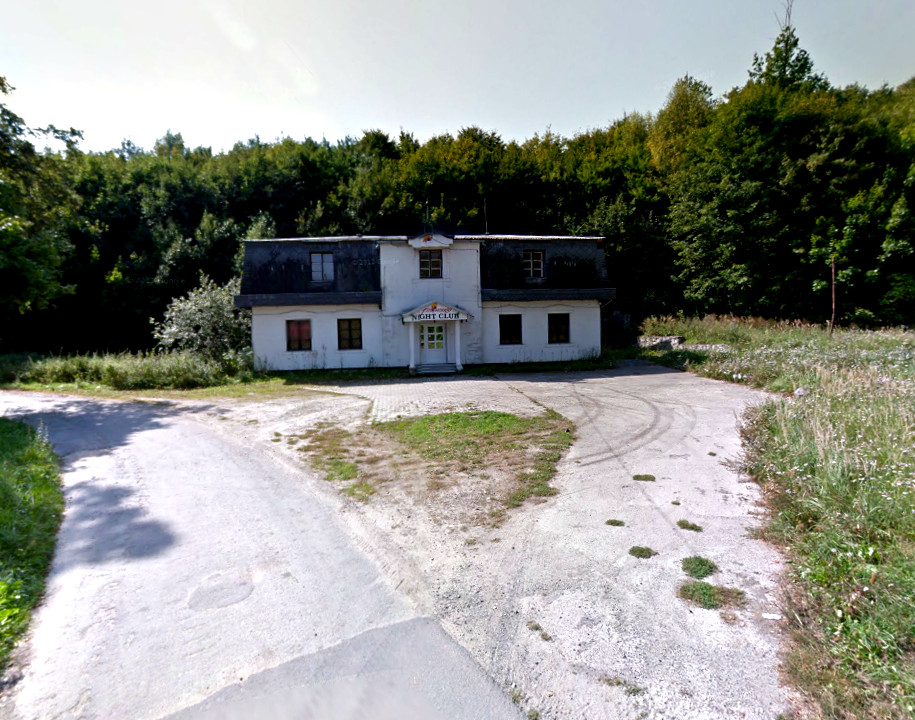
Zámeček, former inn and brothel

Bludoveček is a hamlet in the Bludov municipality in the Olomouc Region of the Czech Republic.

== Etymology ==
The name is diminutive of Bludov (Castle).

== Geography ==
Bludoveček is situated in hillside of Chocholík hill that is part of Hanušovice Highlands. A paved road connects the hamlet with Bludov and outskirt of Šumperk.

== History ==
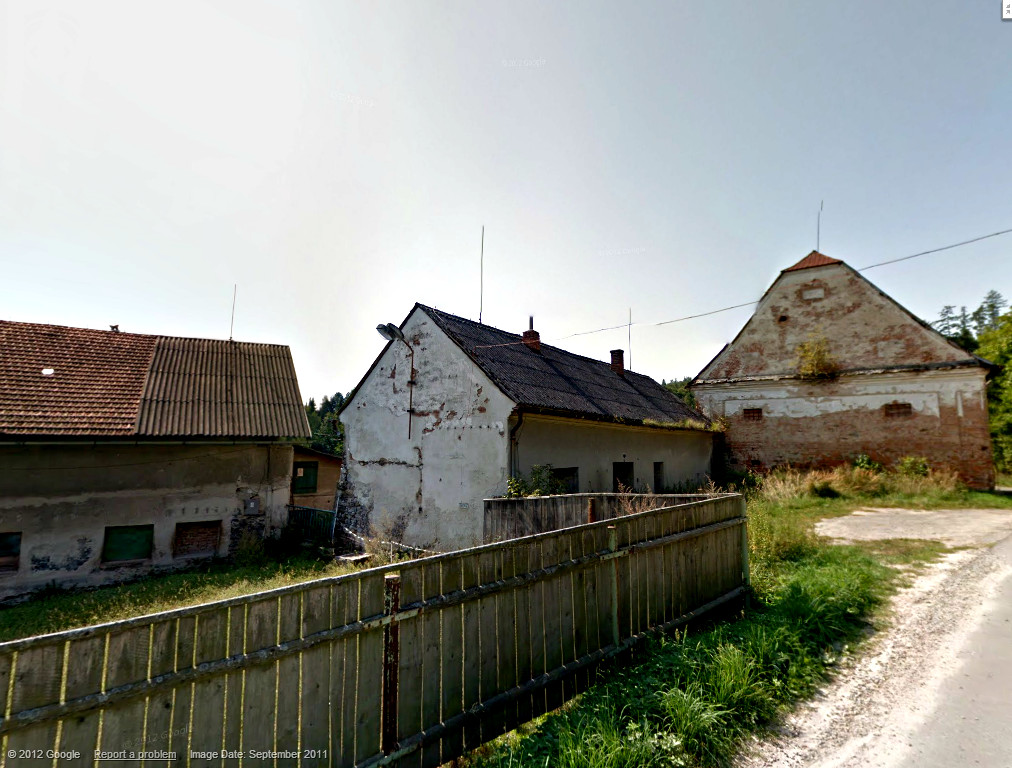
Historic granary and a cowshed

The Bludov Castle castle was founded in the 13th century, when exactly Bludoveček was established is unclear. Medieval buildings haven't been preserved. The oldest structure is a former granary but its age is unsure because the granary has not been archaeologically explored.

== Demography ==
Bludoveček had about 27 people older than 18 years as of 2003. The number of younger persons is not available.
