= Pochvalov =

- Municipality
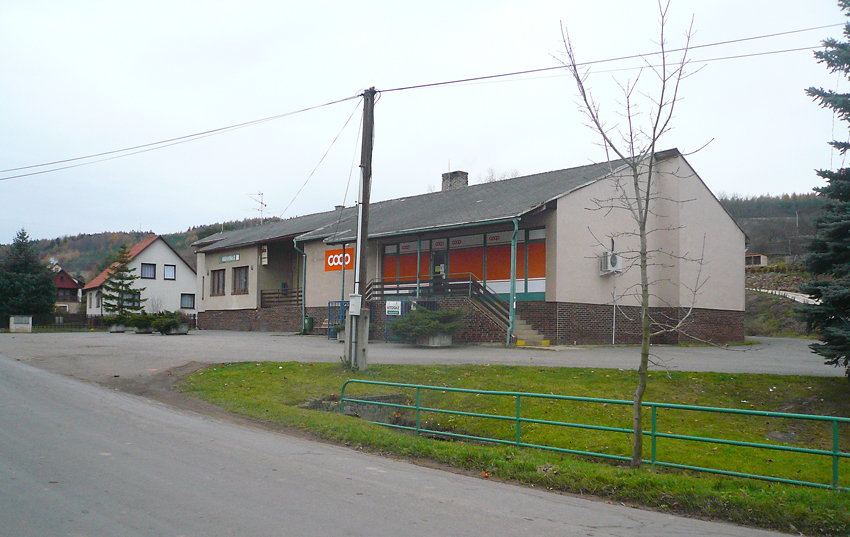
- Grocery store

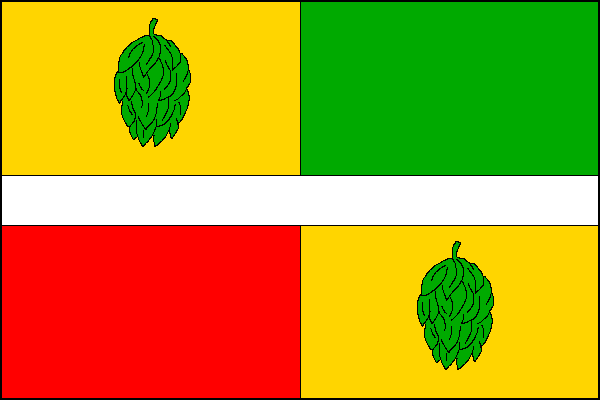
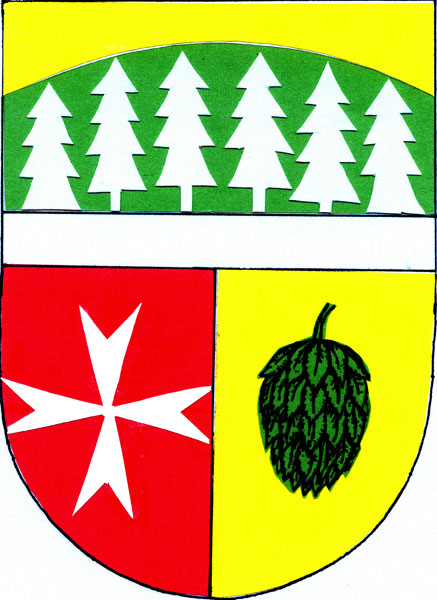
- Flag Coat of arms

- Location in the Czech Republic
- Coordinates: 50°13′39″N 13°47′40″E
- Country: Czech Republic
- Region: Central Bohemian
- District: Rakovník
- First mentioned: 1346

Area
  - Total: 4.55 km^{2} (1.76 sq mi)
- Elevation: 382 m (1,253 ft)

Population (2026-01-01)
  - Total: 232
  - Density: 51.0/km^{2} (132/sq mi)
- Time zone: UTC+1 (CET)
  - Summer (DST): UTC+2 (CEST)
- Postal code: 270 55
- Website: www.pochvalov.cz

Pochvalov is a municipality and village in Rakovník District in the Central Bohemian Region of the Czech Republic. It has about 200 inhabitants.

== Etymology ==
The name is derived from the personal name Pochval, meaning "Pochval's (court)".

== Geography ==
Pochvalov is located about 14 kilometres (9 mi) north of Rakovník and 43 km (27 mi) northwest of Prague. It lies in the Džbán range. The highest point is at 485 m (1,591 ft) above sea level.

== History ==
The first written mention of Pochvalov is from 1346, when it belonged to the Knights Hospitaller. Later it was the property of various noble families. Among the most notable owners of Pochvalov were the Zierotin and Lobkowicz families.

In the years 1939–1950, the Jiřina coal mine was in operation near the village.

== Demographics ==
Historical population

Year	Pop.	±%
1869	507	—
1880	570	+12.4%
1890	595	+4.4%
1900	597	+0.3%
1910	564	−5.5%

Year	Pop.	±%
1921	559	−0.9%
1930	559	+0.0%
1950	363	−35.1%
1961	370	+1.9%
1970	299	−19.2%

Year	Pop.	±%
1980	281	−6.0%
1991	252	−10.3%
2001	254	+0.8%
2011	261	+2.8%
2021	254	−2.7%

Source: Censuses

== Economy ==
The area is known for growing hops.

== Transport ==
There are no railways or major roads passing through the municipality.

== Sights ==
The most important monument is the Chapel of Saint Procopius. It is a large Baroque chapel from the mid-18th century.
