= List of spa towns in the Czech Republic =

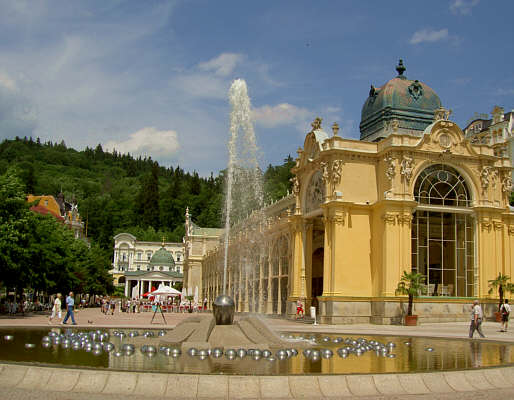
A spa town Mariánské Lázně

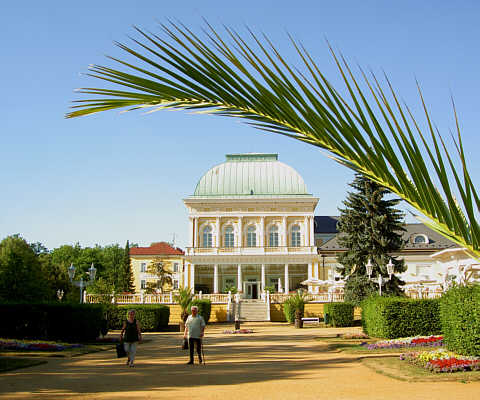
A spa in Františkovy Lázně

There are number of spa towns in the Czech Republic. Between the oldest and most visited are the spas of Karlovy Vary, Mariánské Lázně, Františkovy Lázně, Luhačovice and Poděbrady. In 2011 the Czech spas were visited by around 700,000 guests, of whom around half were foreigners, mainly from Germany, Russia and Austria.

List of spa towns:

- Bílina (German: Bilin)
- Darkov
- Františkovy Lázně (German: Franzensbad)
- Hodonín (German: Göding)
- Jáchymov (German: Sankt Joachimsthal)
- Jeseník (German: Gräfenberg)
- Karlova Studánka (German: Bad Karlsbrunn)
- Karlovy Vary (German: Karlsbad)
- Klimkovice (German: Königsberg in Schlesien)
- Lázně Bělohrad
- Lázně Bohdaneč
- Lázně Bludov (German: Blauda)
- Lipová-lázně (German: Nieder Lindewiese)
- Luhačovice
- Mariánské Lázně (German: Marienbad)
- Poděbrady
- Teplice (German: Teplitz-Schönau)
- Teplice nad Bečvou
- Třeboň (German: Wittingau)
- Velké Losiny (German: Groß Ullersdorf)
