= Rejchartice =

- Municipality
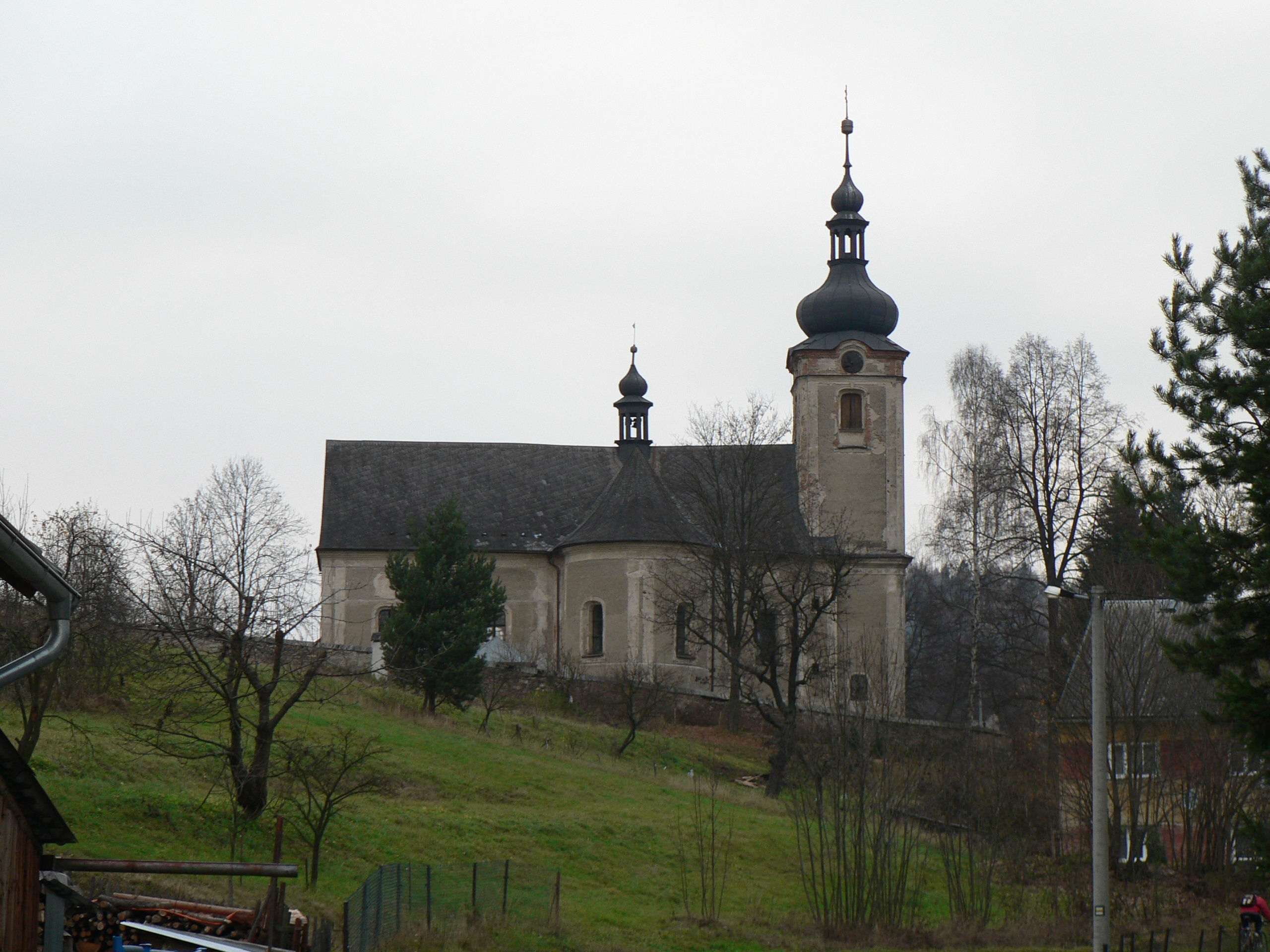
- Church of Saints Michael and Gabriel

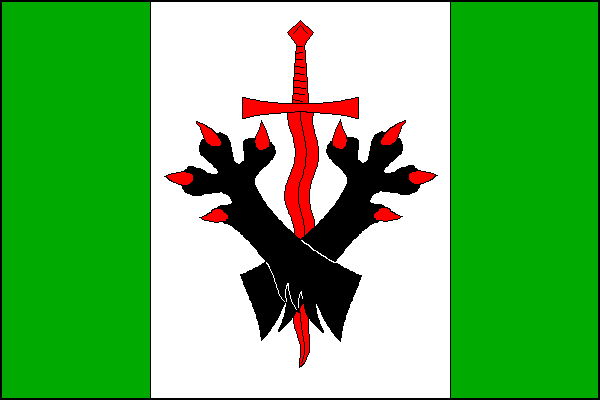
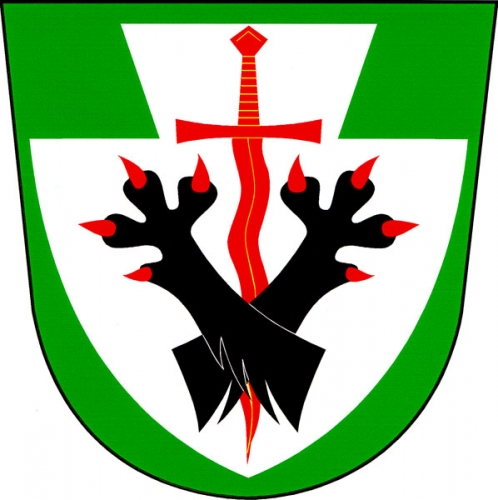
- Flag Coat of arms

- Location in the Czech Republic
- Coordinates: 50°1′42″N 16°58′41″E
- Country: Czech Republic
- Region: Olomouc
- District: Šumperk
- First mentioned: 1350

Area
  - Total: 6.80 km^{2} (2.63 sq mi)
- Elevation: 493 m (1,617 ft)

Population (2026-01-01)
  - Total: 174
  - Density: 25.6/km^{2} (66.3/sq mi)
- Time zone: UTC+1 (CET)
  - Summer (DST): UTC+2 (CEST)
- Postal codes: 787 01
- Website: www.rejchartice.cz

Rejchartice (German: Reigersdorf) is a municipality and village in Šumperk District in the Olomouc Region of the Czech Republic. It has about 200 inhabitants.

== Etymology ==
The village was named after its probable founder named Richard.

== Geography ==
Rejchartice is located about 6 kilometres (4 mi) north of Šumperk and 51 km (32 mi) north of Olomouc. It lies in the Hanušovice Highlands. The highest point is the hill Smrk at 742 m (2,434 ft) above sea level. The stream Rejchartický potok flows through the municipality.

== History ==
The first written mention of Rejchartice is in a deed of Olomouc bishop Jan Volek from 1350. For centuries, until 1848, the village was part of the Bludov estate and shared its owners.

== Demographics ==
Historical population

Year	Pop.	±%
1869	539	—
1880	563	+4.5%
1890	559	−0.7%
1900	548	−2.0%
1910	548	+0.0%

Year	Pop.	±%
1921	490	−10.6%
1930	485	−1.0%
1950	210	−56.7%
1961	208	−1.0%
1970	187	−10.1%

Year	Pop.	±%
1980	186	−0.5%
1991	153	−17.7%
2001	161	+5.2%
2011	176	+9.3%
2021	164	−6.8%

Source: Censuses

== Transport ==
There are no railways or major roads passing through the municipality.

== Sights ==
The main landmark of Rejchartice si the Church of Saints Michael and Gabriel. It was built in the Baroque style in 1768–1770, when the old small church from 1643 was completely rebuilt.
