= Habermann's Mill and Villa =

Mill and house in Bludov, Czech Republic

- Habermannův mlýn
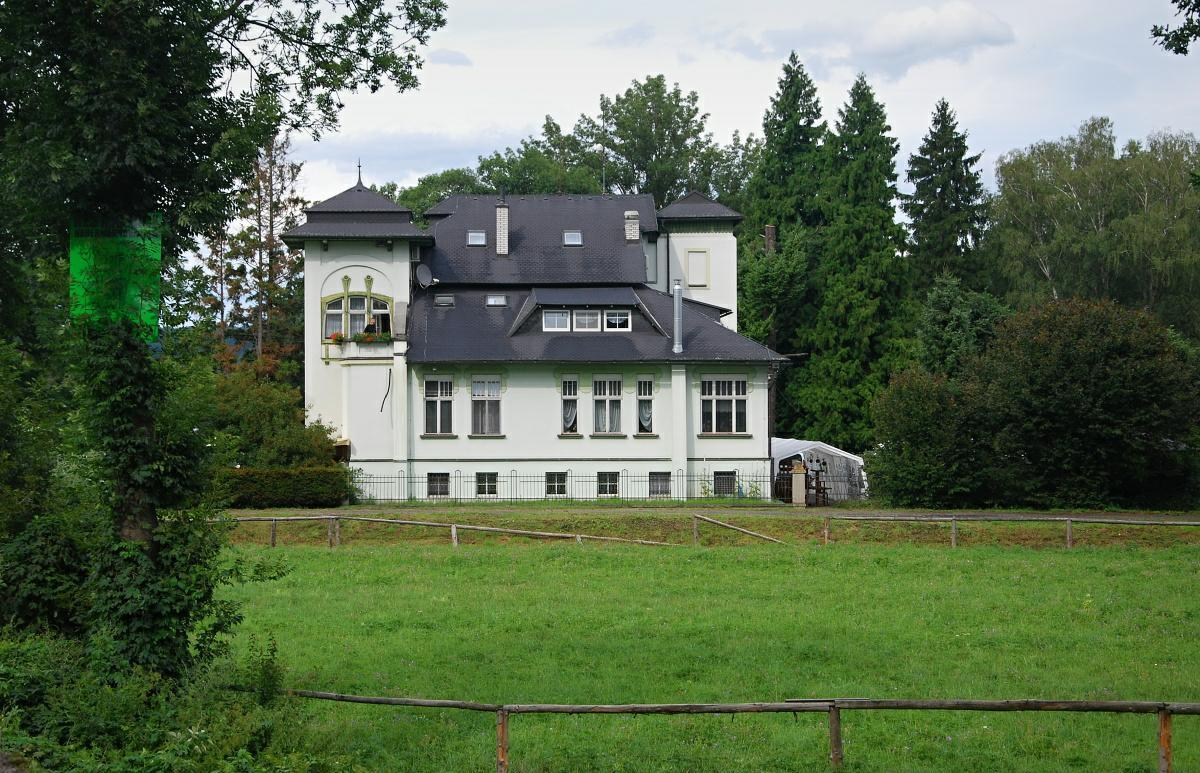
- Habermann's Villa

Watermill and villa
- Architectural style: Art Nouveau
- Location: Bludov, Czech Republic
- Coordinates: 49°55′41.07″N 16°55′13.88″E

Water Power
- Wheels: 2

Habermann's Mill and Villa (Czech: Habermannův mlýn) is a pair of monuments in Bludov municipality in the Olomouc Region of the Czech Republic. It is formed by a watermill and an Art Nouveau villa. Together it forms a small hamlet named Habermannův mlýn.

== Geography ==
The Morava River flows next to the hamlet. The watermill is powered by a branch of the Morava.

== History ==
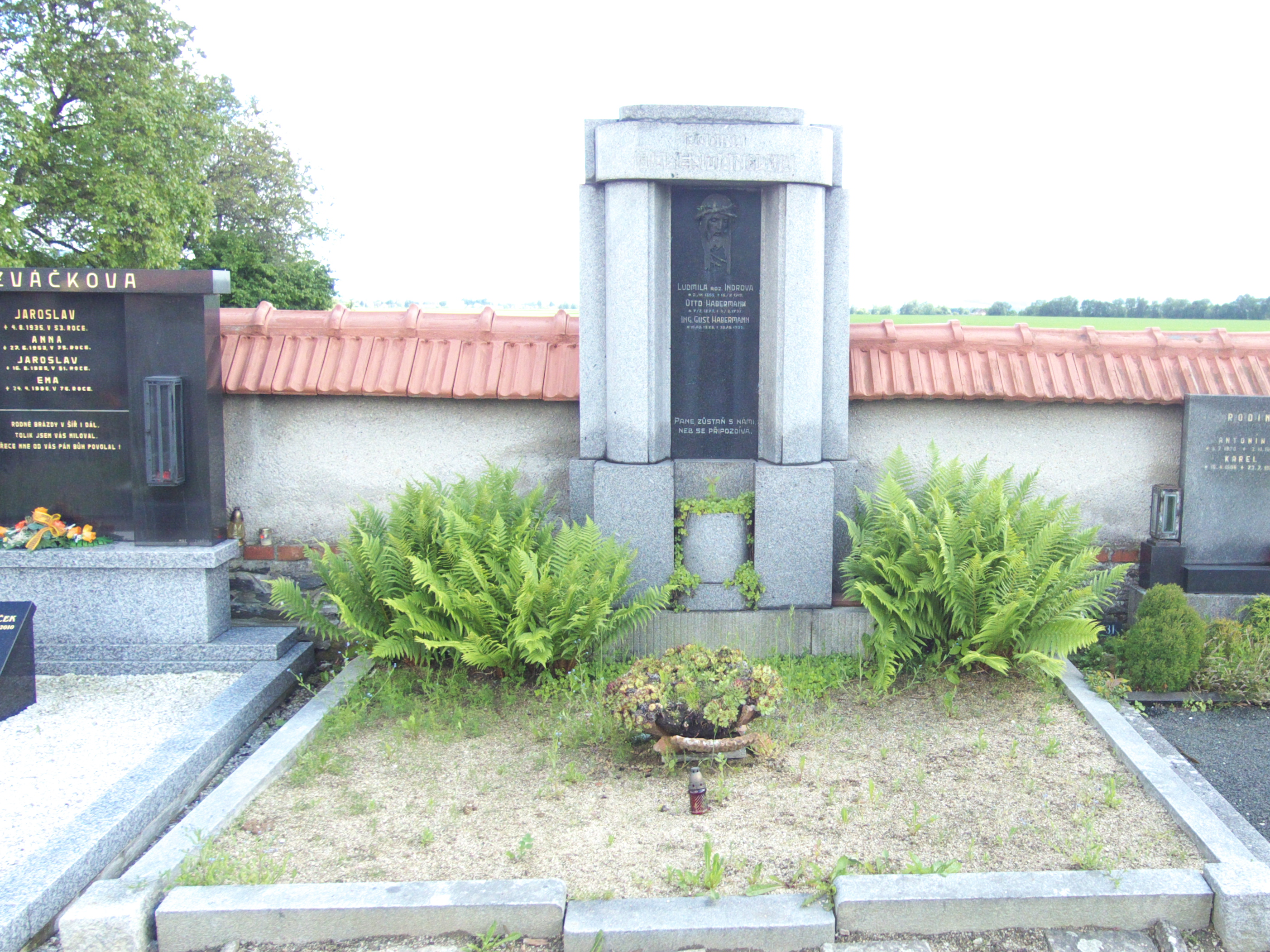
Habermann's grave in Chromeč

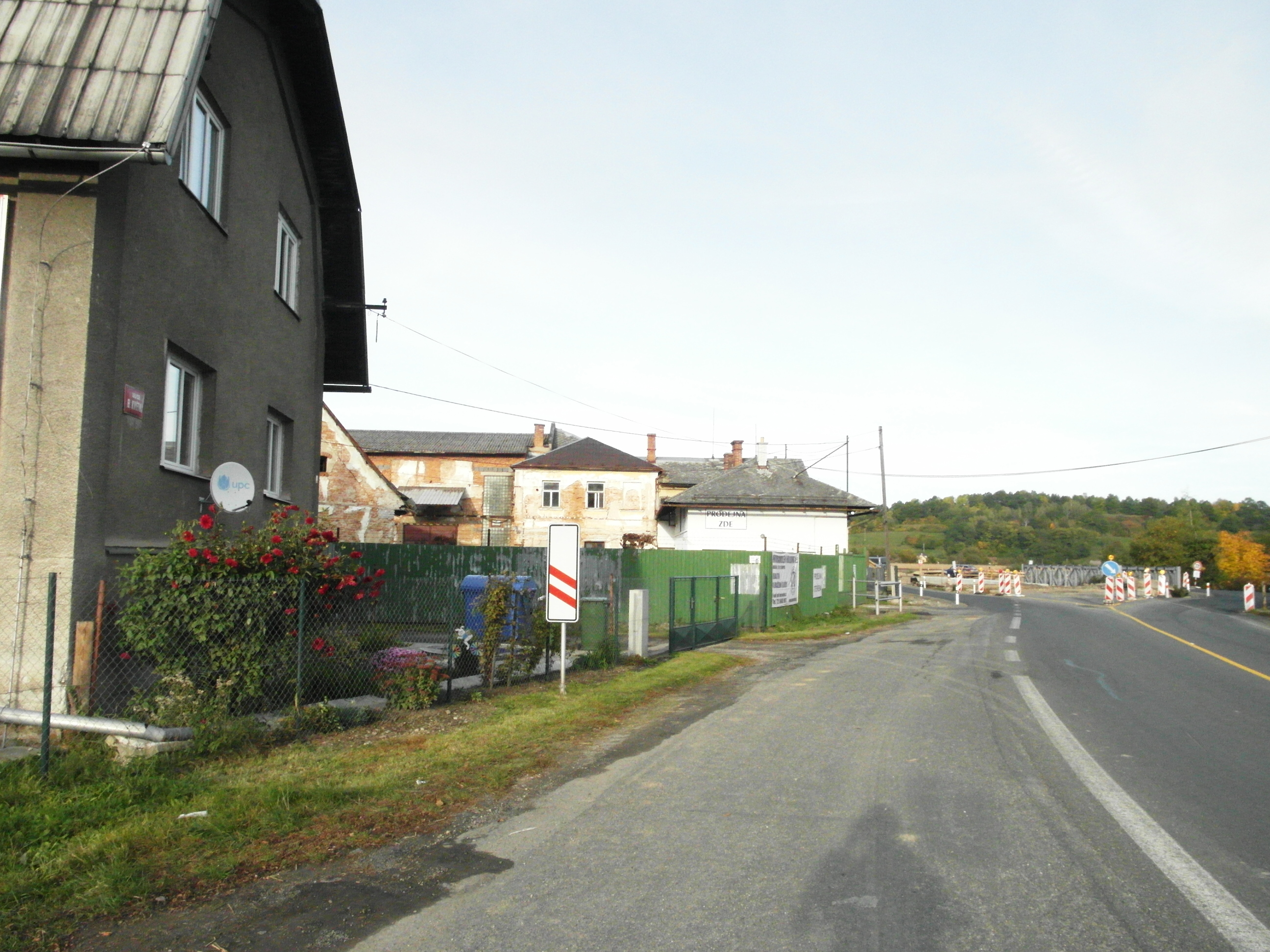
The mill

The area was owned by the Sudeten German Habermann family. The Art Nouveau villa was built in 1920 as Hubert Habermann's residence. The adjoining buildings were used as a sawmill, watermill and cooperage. A small business producing wooden boxes was established in the mill too.

The mill as well as the villa was confiscated by law enforcement in 1945. Habermann was arrested and murdered by a local barber.

The villa was rebuilt and turned into public housing. A turbine was installed in the mill. Mill warehouses were used as a garage for a collective farm.

== Economy ==
In the 1990s, the villa was rebuilt as a 4-star hotel and a restaurant, and is still used today. Part of the mill was rebuilt as subsidized housing.

Two Francis turbines are installed in former mill. Turbines outputs are 41.44 kW and 25.90 kW. Two overshot water wheels are installed in former sawmill. Its output is 8.8 kW and 6.29 kW. Its water source is the Morava.

== Transport ==
A bus stop is situated in the hamlet.

The I/44 road passes between the villa and the mill.

== Art ==
The place is reflected in Josef Urban's Habermann's Mill book. A real story of Hubert Habermann's murder was imagined. The book was controversial because it blames the Pospíšil family who still live in Bludov.

The Habermann film was made based on the events that took place here.
