= Josef Drásal =

Czech Republic's tallest man

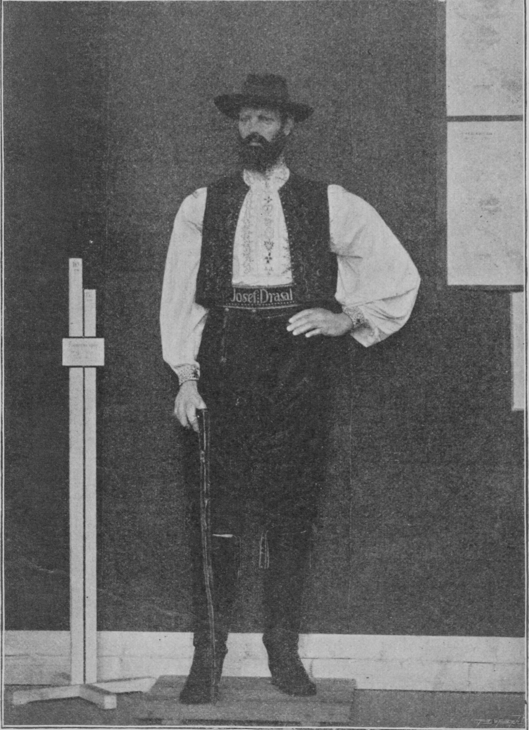
- Figure of Josef Drásal from 1895
- Born: 4 July 1841; Chromeč, Moravia, Austrian Empire
- Died: 16 December 1886 (aged 45); Holešov, Moravia, Austria-Hungary
- Known for: The tallest Czech
- Height: 240 cm (7 ft 10.5 in)

Josef Drásal (4 July 1841 – 16 December 1886) is the tallest Czech ever measured and one of the tallest people of the world. He measured at least 240 centimetres (7 ft 10.5 in) and weighed 186 kg (410 lb).

== Life ==
Drásal was born in Chromeč, into a poor family as the third of six children. At an early age, he differed from his peers and reportedly suffered from pains that were attributed to his abnormally rapid growth. Growth pain probably affected his mental development. He had great strength, but despite graduating from primary school, he did not learn to read and write properly.

Drásal was considered a good and gentle man. After school he started working as a day laborer in his native village and then as a coachman in Bludov Chateau. In 1860 he went to the town of Holešov to work as an agricultural worker.

In Holešov, a local innkeeper noticed him and turned him into a circus attraction. He became known as "Hanakian Giant" and performed in the traditional costume typical of this ethnographic region. He travelled all over Europe with his performance, most notable were his performances for emperors Napoleon III and Wilhelm I. His circus career earned him his own house in Holešov, where he lived until his death. Nothing has been preserved from the building modifications adapting the house to his height.

Drásal died in Holešov at the age of 45 from an unknown disease, probably related to his lifestyle and frequent travel.

== Height ==
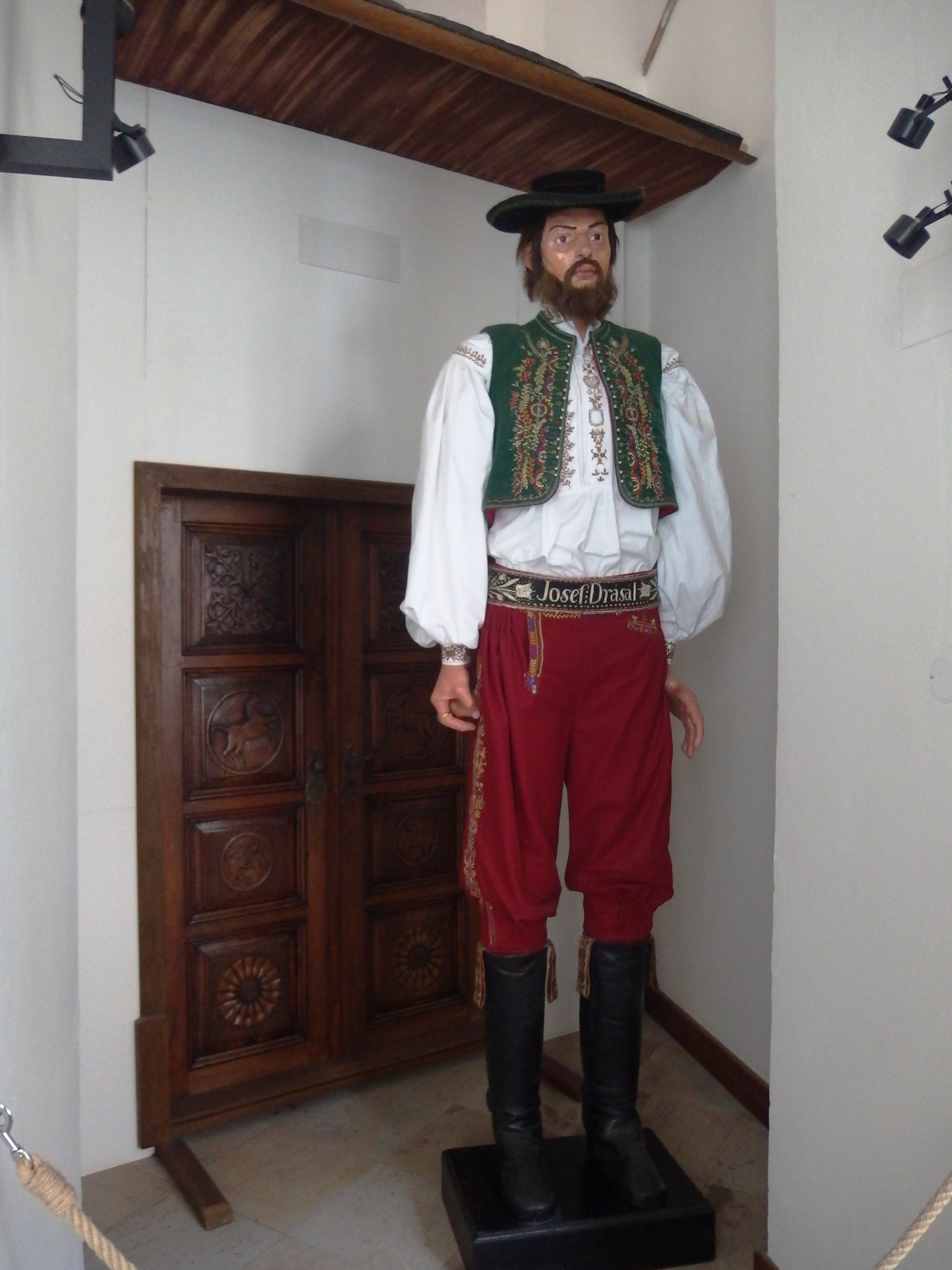
Drásal's figure in the Regional Museum in Olomouc

Drásal's height was caused by acromegaly disease. No evidence of his height has been preserved, but a copy of his skeleton is stored in the Department of Anatomy, Faculty of Medicine, Masaryk University in Brno. The most frequently mentioned height based on his skeleton is 242 centimetres (7 ft 11.3 in), but according to other measurement of the torsion after exhumations, he probably measured 240 centimetres (7 ft 10.5 in).

== Honours and legacy ==
Drásal's name bears the prestigious and most difficult Czech cross-country cycling race named Bikemaraton Drásal, which takes place every year in Holešov.

A street in Holešov is named after Drásal.

A permanent exhibition on Josef Drásal has been in the Regional Museum in Olomouc since 2015. It includes his unique costume.
