= Chromeč =

- Municipality
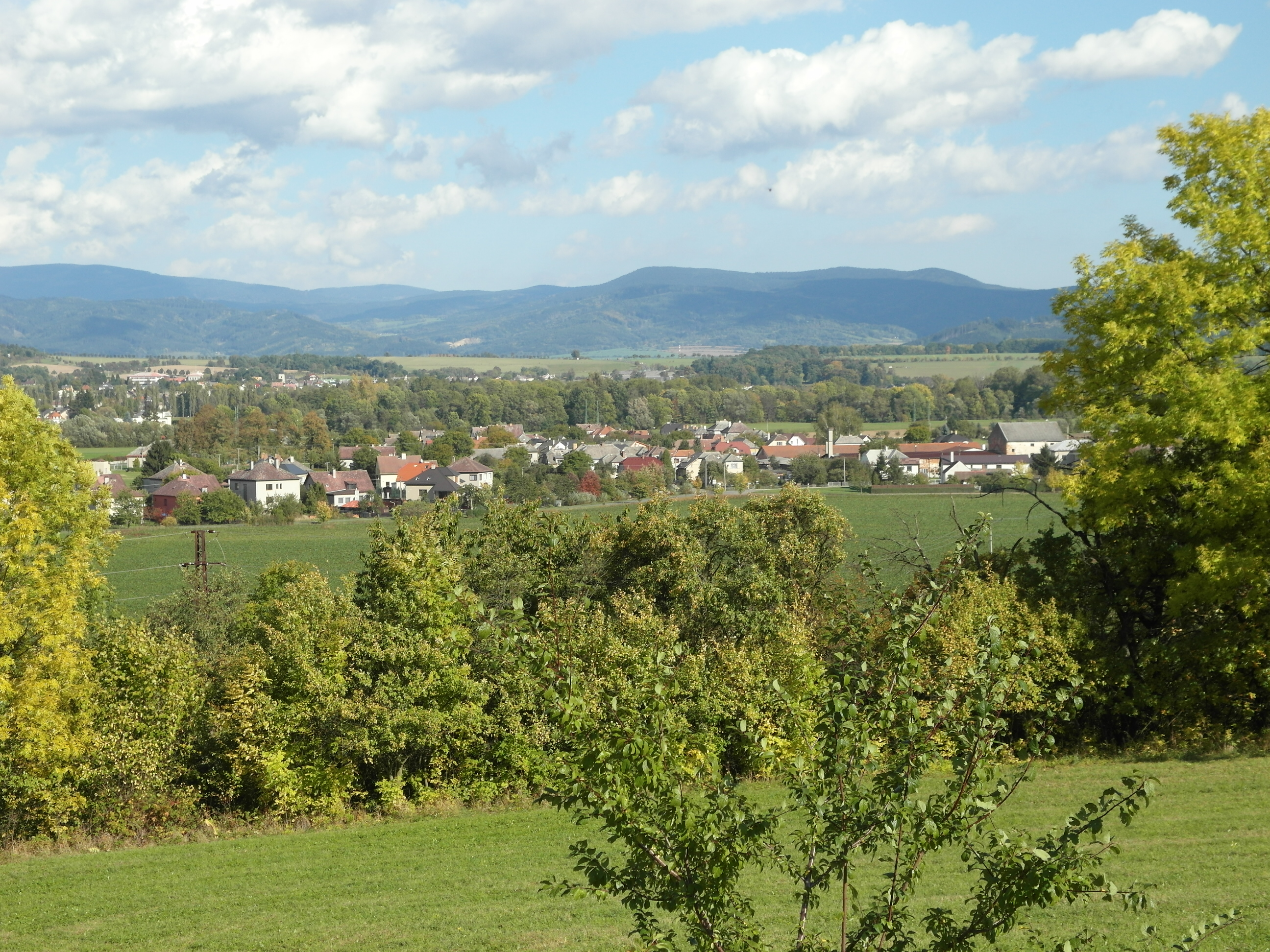
- General view

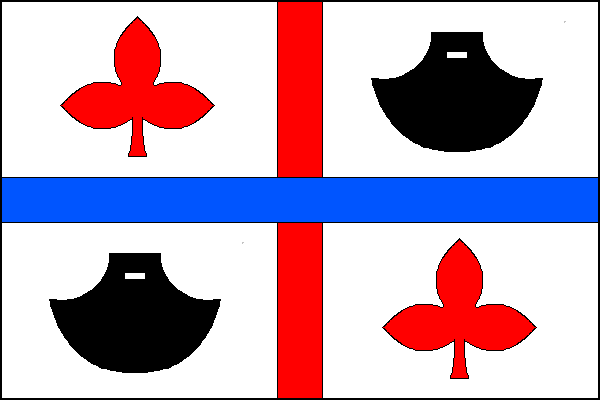
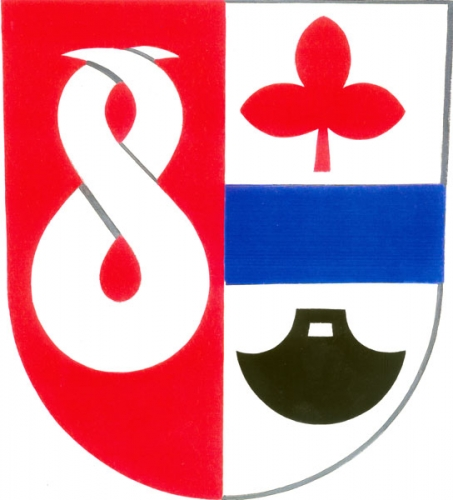
- Flag Coat of arms

- Location in the Czech Republic
- Coordinates: 49°56′2″N 16°53′37″E
- Country: Czech Republic
- Region: Olomouc
- District: Šumperk
- First mentioned: 1353

Area
  - Total: 5.49 km^{2} (2.12 sq mi)
- Elevation: 297 m (974 ft)

Population (2026-01-01)
  - Total: 552
  - Density: 101/km^{2} (260/sq mi)
- Time zone: UTC+1 (CET)
  - Summer (DST): UTC+2 (CEST)
- Postal codes: 789 01
- Website: www.chromec.cz

Chromeč is a municipality and village in Šumperk District in the Olomouc Region of the Czech Republic. It has about 600 inhabitants.

== Geography ==
Chromeč is located about 6 kilometres (4 mi) southwest of Šumperk and 45 km (28 mi) northwest of Olomouc. It lies in the Mohelnice Depression. The municipality is situated on the right bank of the Morava River.

== History ==
The first written mention of Chromeč is from 1353, when the recent area was divided into several parts kept by multiple owners. From 1658 until the abolishment of manorialism in 1848, Chromeč was a part of the Bludov estate.

During World War II, the German occupiers operated the E384 forced labour subcamp of the Stalag VIII-B/344 prisoner-of-war camp in the village.

From 1976 to 1990, Chromeč was a municipal part of Bludov. Since 24 November 1990, Chromeč has been a separate municipality.

== Demographics ==
Historical population

Year	Pop.	±%
1869	639	—
1880	643	+0.6%
1890	628	−2.3%
1900	659	+4.9%
1910	604	−8.3%

Year	Pop.	±%
1921	562	−7.0%
1930	619	+10.1%
1950	506	−18.3%
1961	550	+8.7%
1970	534	−2.9%

Year	Pop.	±%
1980	578	+8.2%
1991	564	−2.4%
2001	584	+3.5%
2011	557	−4.6%
2021	545	−2.2%

Source: Censuses

== Transport ==
The I/11 road, which connects Hradec Králové with Šumperk and continues further to Ostrava, runs through the municipality.

== Sights ==
There are no protected cultural monuments in the municipality. The main landmark of Chromeč is the modern Church of Saint John of Nepomuk.

== Notable people ==
- Josef Drásal (1841–1886), the tallest Czech ever
