= Habermann (film) =

2010 Czech-German-Austrian drama film

- German poster
- Directed by: Juraj Herz
- Written by: Jan Drbohlav; Juraj Herz
- Starring: Mark Waschke; Hannah Herzsprung; Wilson Gonzalez Ochsenknecht; Karel Roden; Franziska Weisz; Ben Becker; Andrej Hryc; Zuzana Kronerová
- Cinematography: Alexander Surkala
- Production companies: Art Oko Film; KN Filmcompany; Entertainment Value Associates; Wega Film
- Distributed by: Farbfilm-Verleih
- Release dates: 6 October 2010 (German-Language Film Festival); 4 November 2010 (Czech Republic)
- Countries: Czech Republic; Germany; Austria
- Languages: Czech; German
- Budget: $3,200,000

Habermann (Czech: Habermannův mlýn) is a 2010 Czech-German-Austrian war drama film directed by Juraj Herz. In the story, the lives of a German mill owner and his family in the Sudetenland are changed dramatically as Europe heats up in 1938. The movie is based on true events and is the first major motion picture to dramatize the post-World War II expulsion of 3 million ethnic Germans from Czechoslovakia.

== Production ==
Juraj Herz has made this statement in describing his film and his reasons for creating it:

These events happened more than sixty years ago, but their effects can be felt even today. If we want to understand the present, we have to know what happened in the past. The film starts with the expulsion: we know from the start how this story will end - there is no escape. Then we are shown the events that led up to it. The story of Habermann ends after the "expulsion" of the Germans from the Sudetenland area bordering Germany and Czechoslovakia in 1945, and remains today one of the darkest chapters in the relationship between Germans and Czechs. The atrocities perpetrated in the course of the expulsion are a taboo to this date. Many Czechs do not want to be reminded of it, many Germans insist that they have been wronged bitterly at the time and that nobody has ever had to pay for this. There is now a new young generation that wants information about the past.

The script was created on the basis of a book by Josef Urban, based on the fate of the real Hubert Habermann, a miller from Bludov in North Moravia. In 2001, the novel Habermannův mlýn (Habermann's Mill) by Urban was published, being the first novel in Czech literature about the expulsion of the Sudeten Germans, concerning the murder of the miller Habermann in 1945 who was known to be friendly towards Czechs. Herz gave his interest in adopting the novel Habermannův mlýn into a film as based on his own Jewish background growing up in wartime Slovakia. Herz recalled that the Hlinka Guard were brutal towards Jews like himself, but that the local volksdeutsche (ethnic Germans) were kind and friendly. Herz complained that in 1945, the volksdeutsche were all expelled into Germany as traitors to Czechoslovakia while the Hlinka Guardsmen who had deported him to Auschwitz simply changed their uniforms, joining the Czechoslovak security forces and the Communist Party.

== Plot ==
In 1937, August Habermann is a wealthy ethnic German owner of a local mill that serves as both a sawmill and gristmill in the town of Eglau in the Sudetenland. Habermann employs both Sudeten Germans and Czechs and believes that the two peoples should co-exist peacefully. Habermann is apolitical and marries a Czech woman, Jana, whom he later learns is half-Jewish. Habermann's best friend, Karel Březina, is Czech. In October 1938, after the Munich Agreement, the Sudetenland is transferred to Germany. Habermann welcomes the change as it gives his firm access to the German market, but Karel warns him that he and all the other Czechs in the Sudetenland are now second-class citizens. Karel's warning is soon confirmed by the arrival of the brutal SS Sturmbannführer Kurt Koslowski, who mistreats the local Czechs. Koslowski takes a bullying tone toward August, forcing him to sell flour from the mill to a local hospital/spa that treats wounded German soldiers at cost. August is shocked by the way Koslowski beats his Czech employees. August is especially protective of one of his Czech employees, Masek, the son of his housekeeper Eliška, who is later revealed to be his half-brother as Eliška was his father's mistress.

Over the opposition of August, his ardently Nazi younger brother Hans joins the Wehrmacht in 1941 after graduating from the Hitler Youth. In 1943, pamphlets appear predicting Germany's defeat, leading Koslowski to kill Hora, the Czech bookkeeper at the mill. Hans is badly wounded in 1944, and Jana takes him off a train, making him into a deserter. Hans wants to return to the war, but Jana and August both tell him that he has suffered enough for "that madman". While traveling with Karel down a forest road Masek kills a German soldier he meets, forcing Karel to kill another soldier to silence a witness. Koslowski decides to execute 20 Czechs selected at random in retaliation, leading August to bribe him with his family's expensive jewelry to stop the executions. Koslowski breaks his word and executes nine Czechs he had chosen at random while sending Jana and her daughter to a concentration camp. Hartel, the collaborating Mayor of Eglau, tells Koslowski that Jana's father was Jewish. August is broken in spirit, and he ignores Karel's advice to flee the Sudetenland, saying that this is his home where his family has lived for centuries and he is already spiritually dead as he believes that his wife and daughter are dead.

After Czechoslovakia is liberated in May 1945, a lynch mob atmosphere prevails as the Czechs attack the Sudeten Germans; the Sudeten Germans are forced onto a train bound for occupied Germany by the Czechoslovak Army. Jana together with her daughter escape from the concentration camp and are helped on their way home by Red Army soldiers who are advancing into the Sudetenland. Eliška loots the Habermann family safe and tells Masek that his father was Wilhelm Habermann, making this not theft, but rather giving him his rightful inheritance. Masek boasts to a vengeful Czech mob led by mayor Hartel that he is a Habermann and as such, he is now the owner of the Habermann mill, leading to Hartel and the others to lynch him as a traitor. August is killed by the same lynch mob led by Hartel who tie him to the water wheel of his mill. Jana together with her daughter are expelled from the Sudetenland. As she is forced onto a train that will take her and her daughter to Bavaria, Karel hands her a piece of jewelry that was given to her by August on their wedding day, saying that this is a way to keep his memory alive. The film's epilogue states in reality the forester Karel Březina accused the mayor of leading the mob that lynched the real Hubert Habermann, the owner of a mill in the Sudetenland, but none were ever prosecuted for the crime.

== Cast and characters ==
- Mark Waschke as August Habermann
- Hannah Herzsprung as Jana Habermann
- Wilson Gonzalez Ochsenknecht as Hans Habermann
- Karel Roden as Karel Březina
- Franziska Weisz as Martha Březina
- Ben Becker as SS Sturmbannführer Kurt Koslowski
- Andrej Hryc as Bürgermeister Jan Hartel
- Zuzana Kronerová as Eliška
- Oldřich Kaiser as Brichta
- Radek Holub as Masek
- Jan Hrušínský as Vaclav Pospichal
- Jaromír Dulava as Buchhalter Hora

== Reception ==
In a review in the St. Louis Jewish Light, the critic Cate Marquis praised the film as a "thought-provoking" film that was well acted with "polished production values, lush period costumes and lovely location shots". Marquis wrote: "There was a real Habermann caught up in the insanity of war, and that basis in reality makes this tale all the more disturbing and gripping...But the visual beauty is deceptive, as this is no simple, uplifting morality tale. Rather, it challenges assumptions and explores moral dilemmas...Habermann is not an easy film but it is a worthy one".

In a mixed review, the critic Roger Moore wrote: "Co-adapter and director Juraj Herz skips through history with this story, passing over the beginning of the war, popping us in 1940, ’43, ’44 and ’45. In a region that wasn’t bombed and only touched directly by the war in its closing days, that’s understandable. The Holocaust is introduced directly in a single heart-rending scene, the cries of children overheard in crammed railway cars that pass by". Moore felt that many of the film's characters were either thinly written or too cliched.

Moore concluded: "It’s all rather murky, with the skipping through time, the cartoonish Nazis and the many characters who see “the future” and start to plan for who and what they'll smash or flee from when “The Russians” get there. Habermann is laudable for being that rare film to grapple with the nuances of collaboration. Other films have touched upon it, the women of France getting their heads shaved for fraternizing and falling in love with the occupiers and the like. Here's a film that points its camera at baser motives, the way some oily opportunists see gain in every shift in political fortunes, every triumph or setback on the battlefield. Being “neutral” and above it all isn't an option, hoping people will know and sympathize with the coercion you were under is naïve. But Herz mutes the effect of his bigger messages and themes with all he leaves out. The horrific dilemmas Habermann faces, the accidents and rash behavior of others that he cannot cover for in the eyes of the black-uniformed Germans with machine guns all seems engineered to paper over his moral ambiguity in all this. Thus does a movie about a fence-sitter become a frustrating exercise in fence-sitting itself".

In a review, the critic Jesse Cataldo wrote that the film offers: "... a portrait of a town that never feels completely real, devoid of normality or everyday activity, a depiction which undercuts the eventual emotional escalation...The majority of these characters are concerned solely with themselves, desperate opportunists for whom other people are barriers or distractions. In this context the resolutely moral Habermann comes off as nearly saint-like, but his ethical purity achieves absolutely nothing, a stand that leaves him stranded on the ash heap of history. Habermann may not be a pragmatic classic of the Army of Shadows mold, but it falls within the upper-mid bracket of WWII movies because it doesn’t attempt to understand or define the tragedy it approaches. Its storytelling is often clunky, rushed, and sappy, but it’s never overreaching or didactic, a sense of scope that allows its ultimately small tragedies to stand on their own".

In a review in The New York Times, Mike Hale described the film as: "As directed by the Czech veteran Juraj Herz in prestige-television style, the bulk of the film is a classically proportioned and tasteful wartime soap opera...The depictions of cosmopolitan Germans and mostly avaricious, bestial Czechs are likely to stir strong emotions among some viewers, but over all Habermann is more potboiler than political or historical statement. A subplot involving Habermann’s half-Jewish wife sits awkwardly athwart the central story, supplying pathos and dangerously facile analogies."

In a review in Die Welt, Hanns-Georg Rodek wrote: "Juraj Herz goes further in the victim iconography than German directors have dared to do so far. The station scene is clearly reminiscent of the deportation of Jews, and the Germans wear an equally stigmatizing "N" (for nemec, German) instead of the Jewish star. Habermann appears as a second Schindler who sacrifices his property in order to save as many Czechs as possible. In the end, the nationalist mob braids him on a mill wheel and tortures him, and one inevitably thinks of the Savior on the Cross."

The film has an approval rating of 40% on Rotten Tomatoes from five critic reviews.
