= Church of the Corpus Christi, Bludov =

Roman Catholic church in the Czech Republic

Coordinates: 49°58′8″N 16°55′10″E

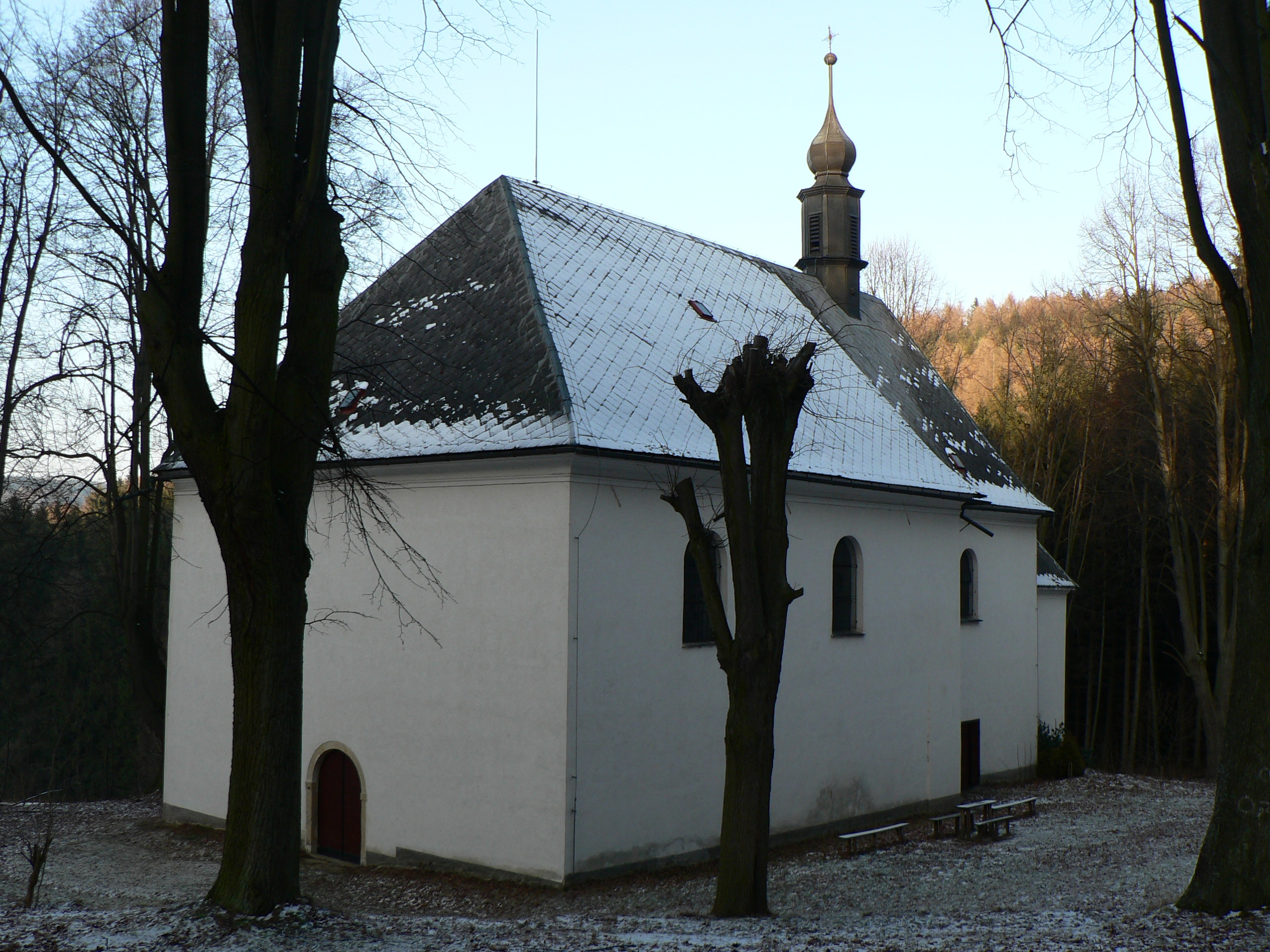
Rear view

Church of the Corpus Christi (Czech: kostel Božího těla) is a pilgrimage Roman Catholic church in the Olomouc Region of the Czech Republic.

== Description ==
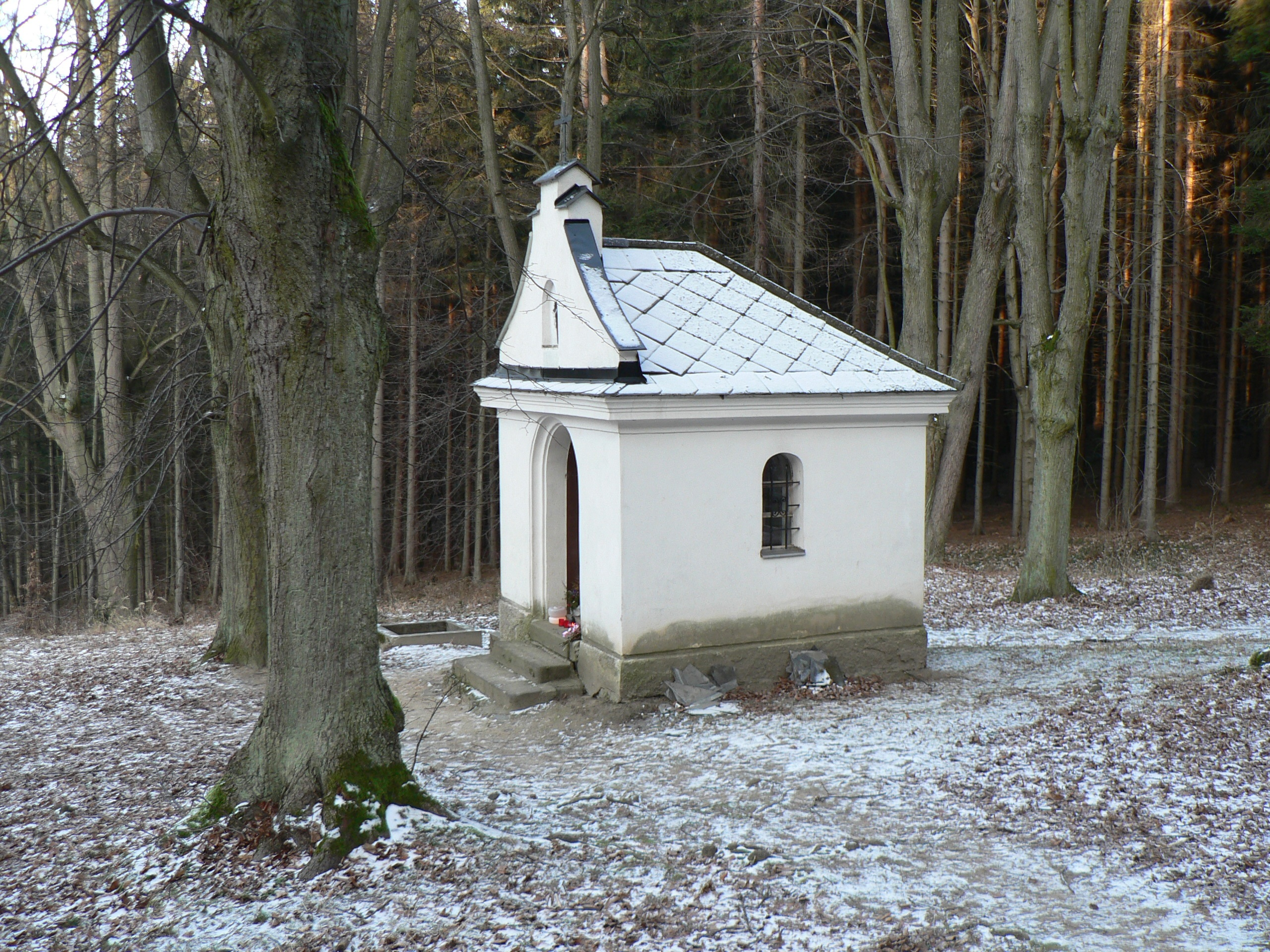
Chapel of Our Lady of Lourdes

The church is located in woods in the territory of in Bludov, between the villages of Bludov and Hrabenov. The pilgrimage site consists of the church, the Chapel of Our Lady of Lourdes, the calvary, the so-called Ston's cross and the Stations of the Cross.

== History ==
At the end of the 17th century, a chapel was built on the pilgrimage site. In 1720–1724, it was rebuilt into the Baroque church. Pilgrims took care of the church until the end of the 18th century. By order of Emperor Joseph II, the church was supposed to be demolished, but the Bludov residents refused and the church was preserved. In 1835, it was rebuilt in the Neoclassical style.

== Legend about the foundation ==
Peasant woman stole a sacramental bread in church in Šumperk. She wanted to add the bread to a cattle fodder to improve milk production. On the way back home, the peasant woman took a short nap in the deep forest, on the site of today's church, and the sacramental bread fell out. Bees moved the bread to a tree cavity and made the wax monstrance. People were so impressed by this miracle they decided to build new church in its place.
