= Vlčí Důl =

Coordinates: 50°40′N 14°37′E

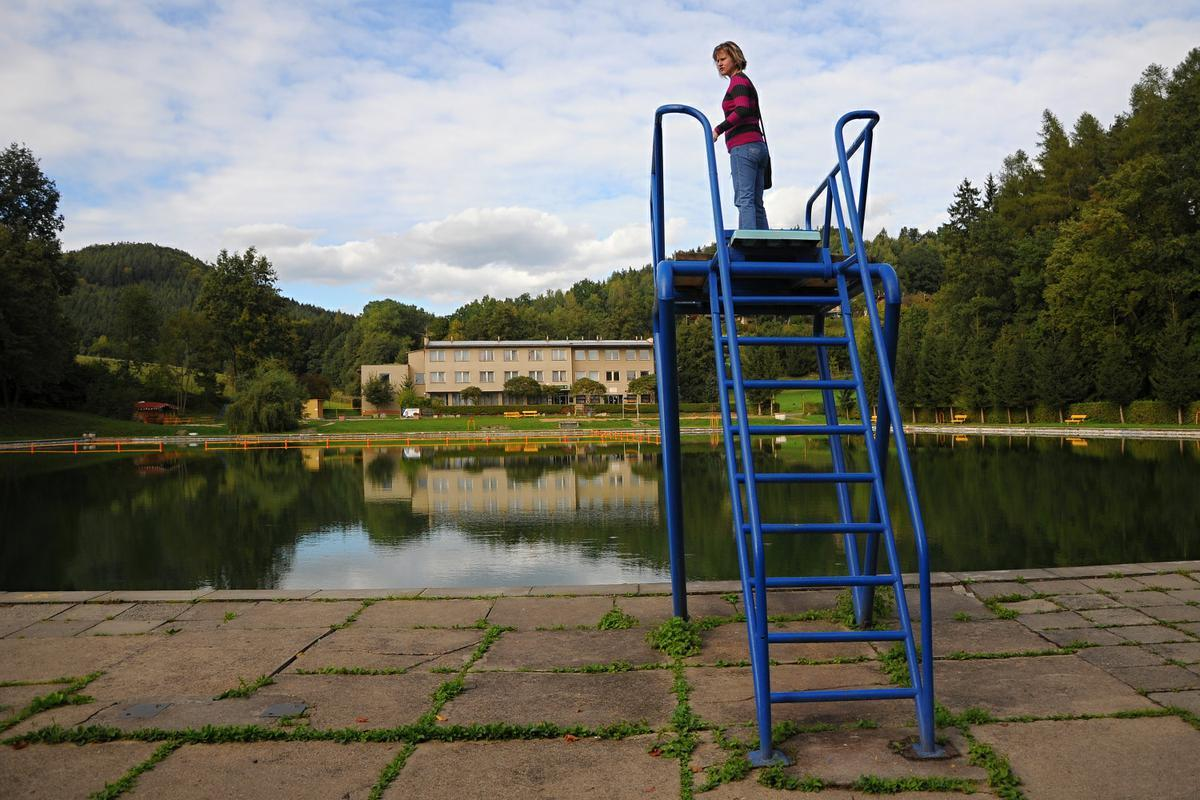
The Vlčí Důl hotel and the pool

Vlčí Důl is a resort, part of Bludov municipality in the Czech Republic.

== Etymology ==
The adjective “Vlčí” means “wolf”. The noun “důl” means “mine" in the new Czech language, but it means both “mine” and “valley” in old Czech. Therefore, the translation can be "mine" or "valley" as the place was named during the Middle Ages when old Czech was spoken.

== History ==
The Petrovický rybník (literally Peter Pond) was situated in the place during the Middle Ages. The pond was drained in 1930. During the late 1940s, a club of fishermen unsuccessfully tried to reestablish the pond. The idea to create a swimming pool was made in 50’s and first works began in 1953. The pool was built by participants of Action Z.

The pool opened on 13 July 1963 and named after Vlčí Důl, a nearby valley. A source of water is Vitonický potok (literally Vitonice creek). The area became relatively popular and a parking lot, showers, toilets, playground, and paved road were constructed a few years after it opened.

In 1965, František Hroch, a Bludov resident, built a weekend house near the pool. Nowadays, 33 cottages occupy a hillside opposite the pool.

The Hubert Hunter Club built a cottage in 1985. A hotel was built in 1987.

== Present Day ==
The resort is in decay. The hotel and restaurant went bankrupt at the beginning of the 21st century. The hotel relied on recreation organized by communist ROH. But in capitalist Czech Republic, outdated facilities were not able to compete. The relatively remoteness of the resort and distance from attractive tourist destinations in High Ash Mountains worsened the decline.

The hotel is owned by the municipality which tried to sell or lease the building without significant interest from potential buyers.

Eventual demolition was resisted by Bludov citizens.

Unlike the pool and the hotel, the cottage settlement works well.

== Demography ==
One cottage is permanently inhabited; other estates are used for recreation. Bludov citizens own four cottages, rest is owned by people from Šumperk, Zábřeh and Kroměříž.
