= Lázně Bludov =

Spa in Bludov, Czech Republic

Coordinates: 49°56′23.98″N 16°54′33.98″E

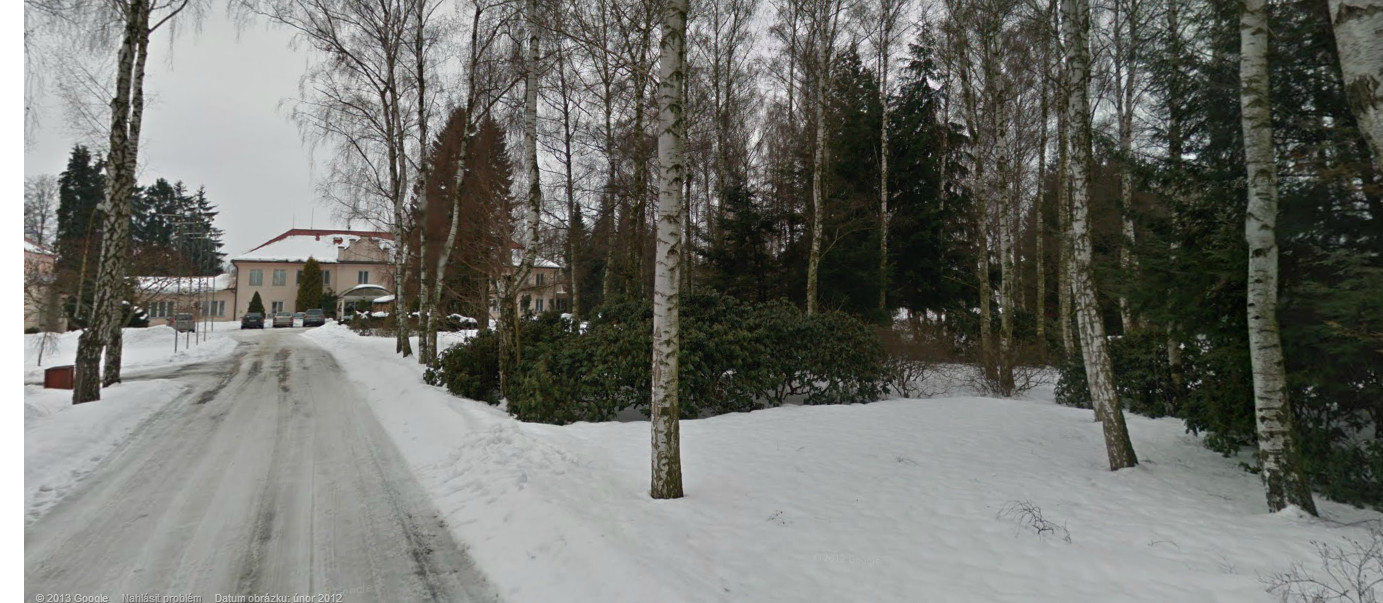
Bludov spa

Lázně Bludov or Bludovské lázně is a spa situated in Bludov, Czech Republic. Strongly alkaline hypotonic thermal mineral water containing sulphates, chlorides and sodium is used for curing child obesity, kidney, urinary tract and musculoskeletal diseases, and respiratory problems.

== History ==
The source of water was known and used from ancient times. In second half of 15th century, the spring was covered by Špalek pond which was dried in 1831. The spring was rediscovered in early 20th century. The spa was established in 1929.
