= Horní Heřmanice (Třebíč District) =

- Municipality
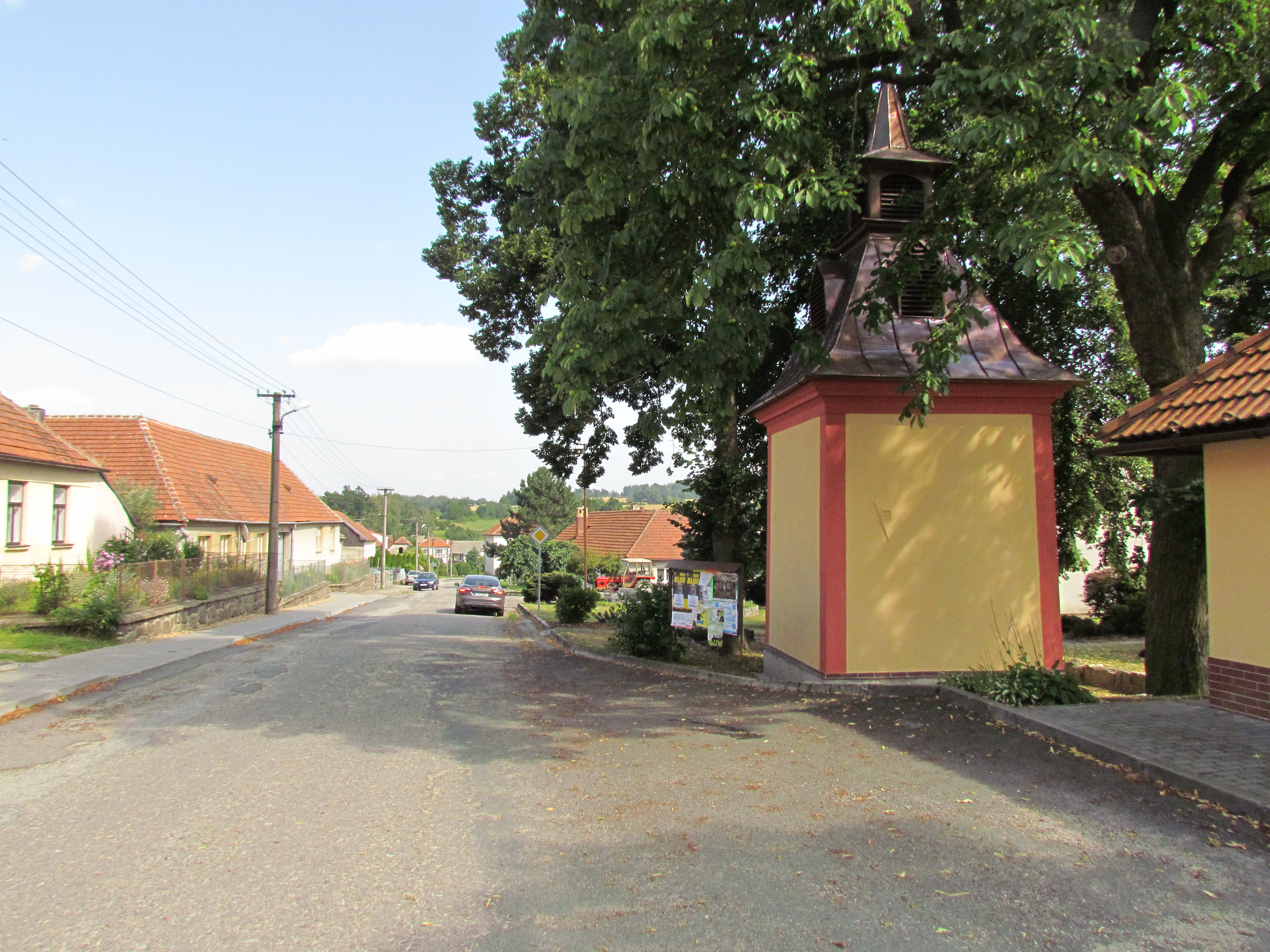
- Centre of Horní Heřmanice

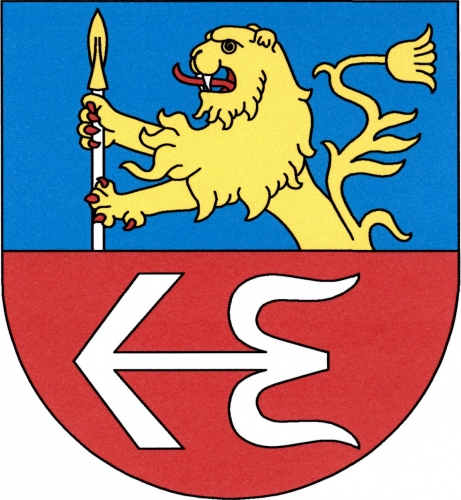
- Flag Coat of arms

- Location in the Czech Republic
- Coordinates: 49°19′46″N 15°55′13″E
- Country: Czech Republic
- Region: Vysočina
- District: Třebíč
- First mentioned: 1447

Area
  - Total: 4.94 km^{2} (1.91 sq mi)
- Elevation: 531 m (1,742 ft)

Population (2026-01-01)
  - Total: 139
  - Density: 28.1/km^{2} (72.9/sq mi)
- Time zone: UTC+1 (CET)
  - Summer (DST): UTC+2 (CEST)
- Postal code: 675 05
- Website: www.obec-horni-hermanice.cz

Horní Heřmanice is a municipality and village in Třebíč District in the Vysočina Region of the Czech Republic. It has about 100 inhabitants.

== Geography ==
Horní Heřmanice is located about 12 kilometres (7 mi) north of Třebíč and 24 km (15 mi) east of Jihlava. It lies in the Křižanov Highlands. The highest point is at 602 m (1,975 ft) above sea level. The stream Heřmanický potok flows through the municipality.

== History ==
The first written mention of Horní Heřmanice is from 1447. From 1563 until the establishment of a sovereign municipality in 1850, the village was part of the Velké Meziříčí estate and shared its owners. Horní Heřmanice was almost completely destroyed by a fire in 1810. The village was then rebuilt.

== Demographics ==
Historical population

Year	Pop.	±%
1869	240	—
1880	252	+5.0%
1890	264	+4.8%
1900	256	−3.0%
1910	273	+6.6%

Year	Pop.	±%
1921	262	−4.0%
1930	229	−12.6%
1950	177	−22.7%
1961	180	+1.7%
1970	158	−12.2%

Year	Pop.	±%
1980	169	+7.0%
1991	163	−3.6%
2001	133	−18.4%
2011	137	+3.0%
2021	141	+2.9%

Source: Censuses

== Transport ==
There are no railways or major roads passing through the municipality.

== Sights ==
The only protected cultural monument in the municipality is a stone crucifix from 1848. In the centre of the village is a small chapel.
