= Bludov (Kutná Hora District) =

- Municipality
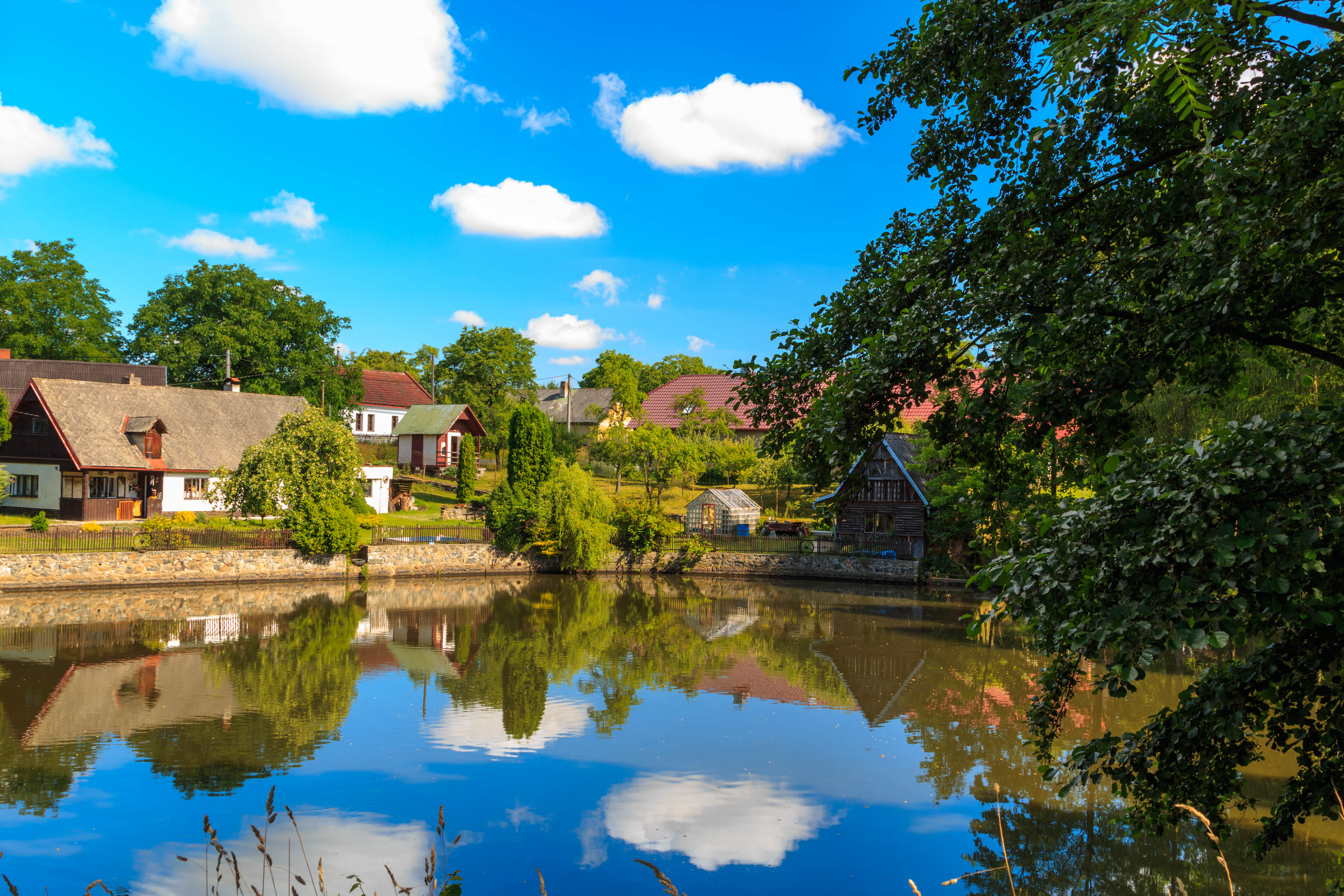
- Pond in the centre of Bludov

- Location in the Czech Republic
- Coordinates: 49°48′27″N 15°15′19″E
- Country: Czech Republic
- Region: Central Bohemian
- District: Kutná Hora
- First mentioned: 1550

Area
  - Total: 2.01 km^{2} (0.78 sq mi)
- Elevation: 506 m (1,660 ft)

Population (2026-01-01)
  - Total: 25
  - Density: 12/km^{2} (32/sq mi)
- Time zone: UTC+1 (CET)
  - Summer (DST): UTC+2 (CEST)
- Postal code: 286 01
- Website: www.ou-bludovkh.cz

Bludov is a municipality and village in Kutná Hora District in the Central Bohemian Region of the Czech Republic. It has about 30 inhabitants.

== History ==
The first written mention of Bludov is from 1550.

== Demographics ==
Historical population
Year	Pop.	±%
1869	180	—
1880	159	−11.7%
1890	151	−5.0%
1900	131	−13.2%
1910	138	+5.3%
1921	153	+10.9%
1930	128	−16.3%
1950	92	−28.1%
1961	83	−9.8%
1970	47	−43.4%
1980	35	−25.5%
1991	35	+0.0%
2001	26	−25.7%
2011	25	−3.8%
2021	19	−24.0%
Source: Censuses
