= Bludov Castle =

Ruined castle in the Czech Republic

Coordinates: 49.9554°N 16.9331°E

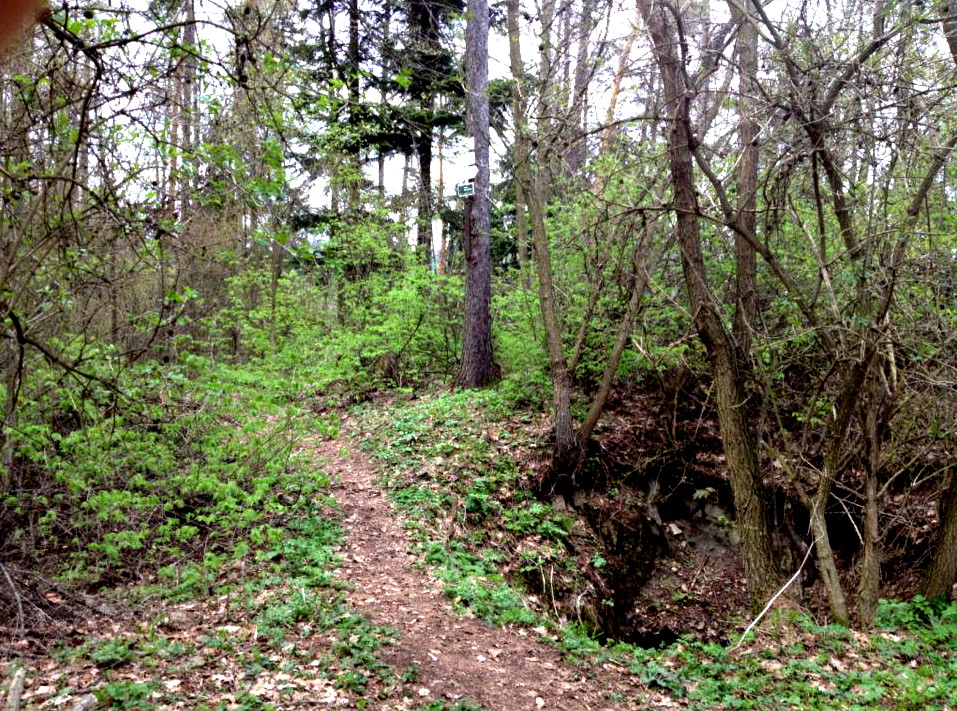
Remnants of cellar

Bludov Castle (Czech: Bludovský hrad) is a now-ruined former medieval fortification in the Bludov municipality in the Olomouc Region of the Czech Republic. It is situated on the top of the Na Starém zámku Hill with an elevation of 460 metres (1,510 ft). Remains of its masonry, ditches and ramparts have been protected since 1958 as a cultural monument.

== History ==
The castle was allegedly founded in the first half of the 13th century by Knight Blud of Bludov but, more likely, by his descendant Blud III (1238–1288) – the predecessors of the Zierotin family. Yet, the oldest documented owners of the castle were the Lords of Lipá, a powerful noble family from Bohemia. In 1346 Bludov obtained Lord Čeněk of Lipá, Supreme Marshal of the Kingdom of Bohemia. The Lords of Lipá did not reside in the castle but bestowed it, together with the surrounding estate, on lower nobles (knights) as a fief.

Indebted, Lord Čeněk of Lipá was forced to sell the castle in 1352 to John Henry, Margrave of Moravia. After his death in 1375, Bludov was inherited by his son, Margrave Prokop. While the castle was owned by the margraves, an extensive enlargement was done. The moat was extended around the whole castle and surrounded by a rampart. The inner castle was provided with a ward on the south-east, where there was also the newly situated main gate. On the north a vast fortification of the forecourt was built, surrounded by a moat with forward circular earthwork. On the north and south, fortifications protected the castle from bombarding from the neighbouring, higher, hill. On the south two forward log cabins (named Trhovice and Bašta), shielded the castle from attack and shelling from the south.

At the turn of the 14th and 15th centuries the castle was often pawned, since 1397 it fell to the Lords Kunštát, predecessors of the House of Podiebrad. Smil of Kunštát used the castle as the base for raids in the surrounding area. Just at the beginning of the Hussite Revolution the castle passed in 1420 to royal hand. King Sigismund of Luxembourg held it until 1436. After the mid-15th century, the castle was acquired by the Moravian aristocratic family of Tunkl of Brníčko. Jiří Tunkl of Brníčko the Elder was loyal to Hussite "heretic" King George of Poděbrady, so his castles (including the Bludov in 1471) and estates were seized and destroyed by the Hungarian royal army under the command of King Matthias Corvinus during the Bohemian–Hungarian War.

In 1494 when the Bludov estate was sold to the Zierotin family, the castle was already described as abandoned and ruined. During the following centuries, the premises were gradually dismantled for building material; in the 19th century the last remnants were used as a building material for a newly paved road from Bludov to Šumperk, and only few structural elements such as cellars and moats have survived.

== See also ==
- Bludov Chateau
