= Horní Heřmanice (Ústí nad Orlicí District) =

- Municipality
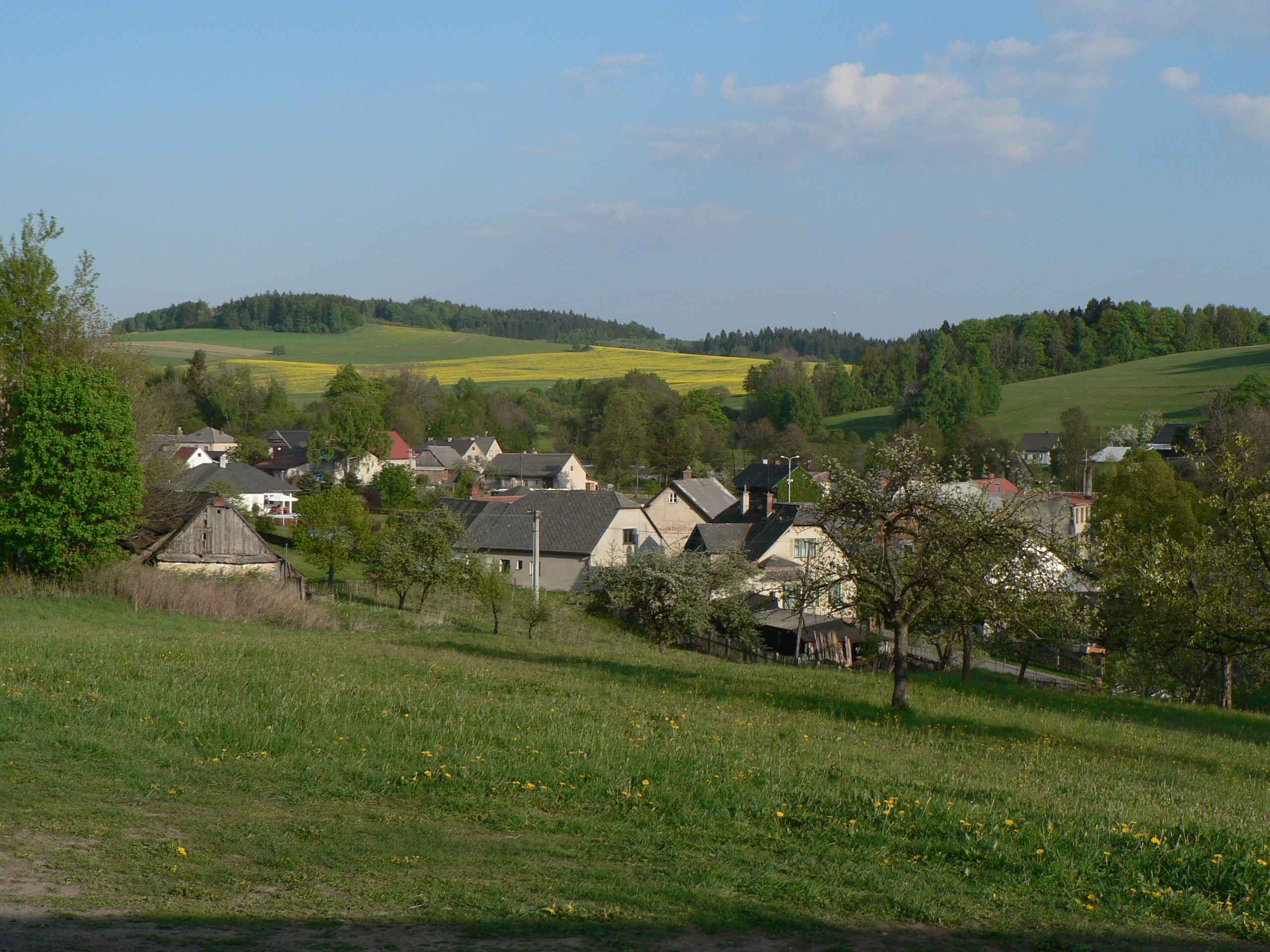
- View from the local church

- Flag Coat of arms

- Location in the Czech Republic
- Coordinates: 49°57′40″N 16°42′40″E
- Country: Czech Republic
- Region: Pardubice
- District: Ústí nad Orlicí
- First mentioned: 1304

Area
  - Total: 15.73 km^{2} (6.07 sq mi)
- Elevation: 578 m (1,896 ft)

Population (2026-01-01)
  - Total: 457
  - Density: 29.1/km^{2} (75.2/sq mi)
- Time zone: UTC+1 (CET)
  - Summer (DST): UTC+2 (CEST)
- Postal code: 561 33
- Website: www.hornihermanice.cz

Horní Heřmanice (German: Ober-Hermanitz) is a municipality and village in Ústí nad Orlicí District in the Pardubice Region of the Czech Republic. It has about 500 inhabitants.

== Administrative division ==
Horní Heřmanice consists of three municipal parts (in brackets population according to the 2021 census):

- Horní Heřmanice (297)
- Dolní Heřmanice (125)
- Rýdrovice (7)

== Demographics ==
Historical population
Year	Pop.	±%
1869	2,091	—
1880	1,978	−5.4%
1890	2,003	+1.3%
1900	1,786	−10.8%
1910	1,670	−6.5%
1921	1,610	−3.6%
1930	1,429	−11.2%
1950	874	−38.8%
1961	805	−7.9%
1970	659	−18.1%
1980	574	−12.9%
1991	525	−8.5%
2001	476	−9.3%
2011	490	+2.9%
2021	429	−12.4%
Source: Censuses
