= Bludov Chateau =

Manor house in the Czech Republic

Coordinates: 49°56′26.12″N 16°55′43.51″E

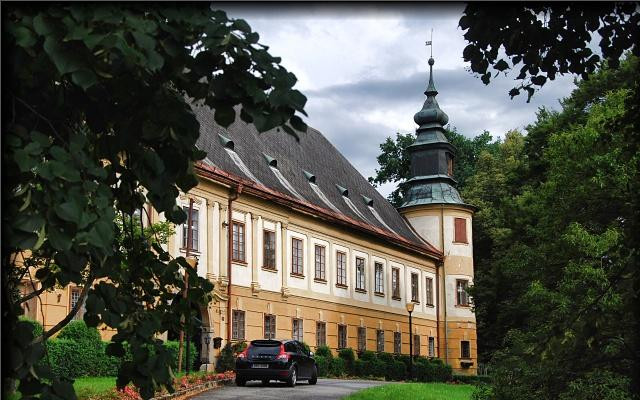
Bludov manor house

Bludov Chateau (Czech: Bludovský zámek) is a manor house in Bludov in the Olomouc Region of the Czech Republic. It is a Baroque building with late Renaissance elements.

== History ==
A stronghold was established in the place probably in the 1570s. The founder was Lord Jan of Boskovice. After the Battle of White Mountain (1620), the Bludov Manor was confiscated and given to Kryštof Pavel of Liechtenstein who rebuilt the stronghold into a Late Renaissance manor house. Later, the manor house was rebuilt in Baroque architectural forms.

In 1710, the building was sold to the Zierotin family, who own it until today. The manor house became Zierotin's permanent residence when Karel Ludvík, the house member, sold the Velké Losiny Castle in 1802 due to financial problems. Zierotin's library, picture gallery, archives, and a collection of weapons were moved as well.

Although the Zierotin family was of Czech origin, they registered as Germans during the Nazi occupation, therefore the castle was confiscated from them in 1945. However, in 1950 the Regional national committee in Brno restored Czech citizenship to Helena Žerotínová, arguing that she acted under the pressure of occupation during the World War II.

Manor house rooms were used as a post office, library and municipal office during the communist dictatorship, therefore some rooms were reconstructed to fit more its new purpose; unfortunately reconstructions did not respect original historical character of the building.

The manor house was returned during the 1990s to the members of Slovak stem of the Zierotins, the Mornstein-Zierotin family.

== Today ==
The manor house is now used as the Mornstein-Zierotin family residence, that offers accommodation service and manages their estate property. The Baroque hall is used for ceremonial purposes like weddings and concerts of classical music. English park is in the neighbourhood, with many valued, exotic and ancient trees, of which the oldest linden is over 600 years old.

== See also ==
- Bludov Castle
