= Zierotin family =

Czech noble family

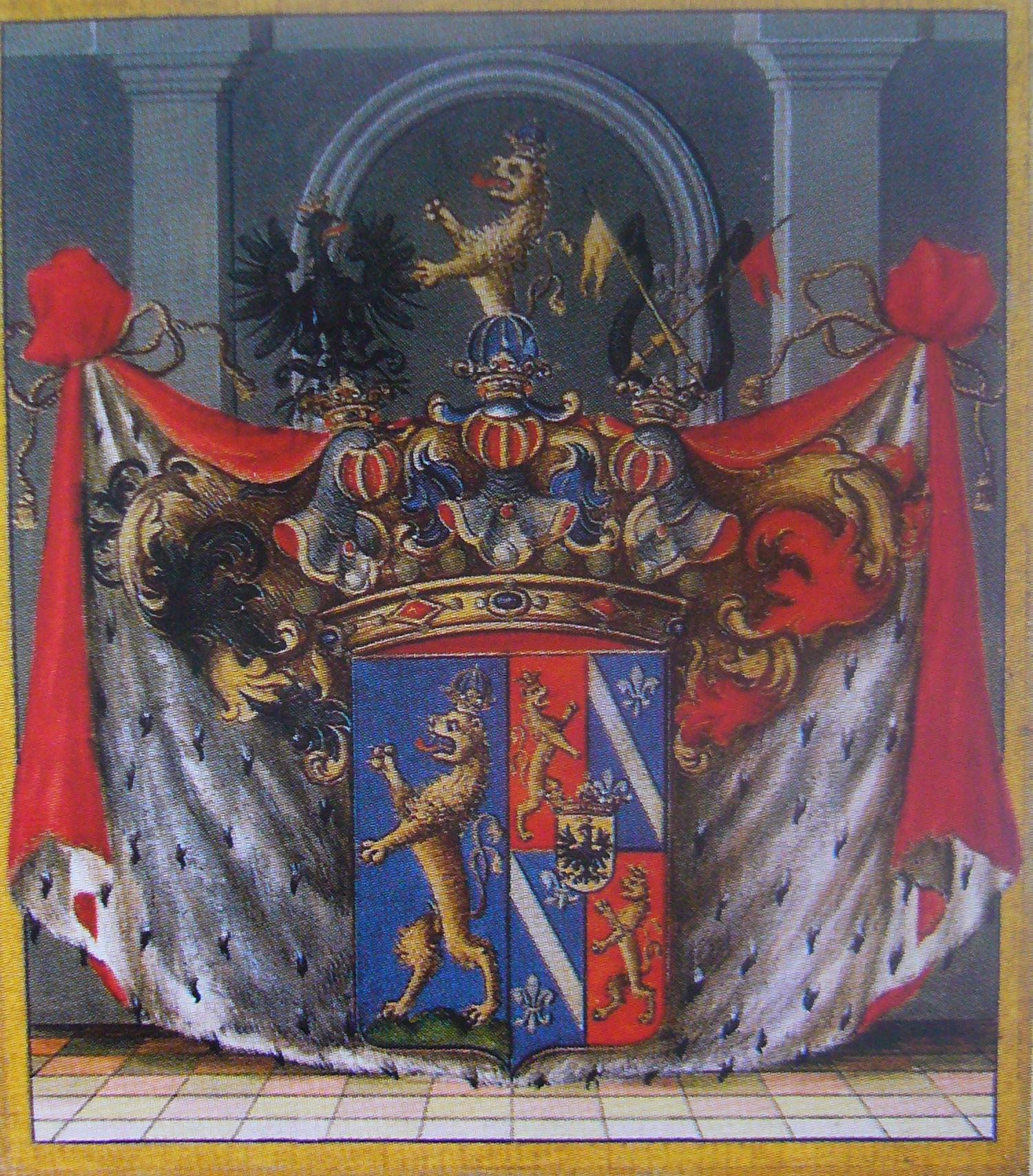
Coat of arms of Counts of Zierotin (1740)

The Zierotin family or Žerotín family (Czech: Žerotínové) was a Czech noble family in the Lands of the Bohemian Crown, one of the oldest and most illustrious noble families from Bohemia and Moravia. The ancestors of the family were first mentioned around 1200. The family achieved the rank of Imperial Counts in the Holy Roman Empire. The family died out at the turn of the 20th and 21st centuries, but its female lines continue to exist. Several properties were returned to the Mornstein-Zierotin after fall of Communist rule in 1989.

== History ==
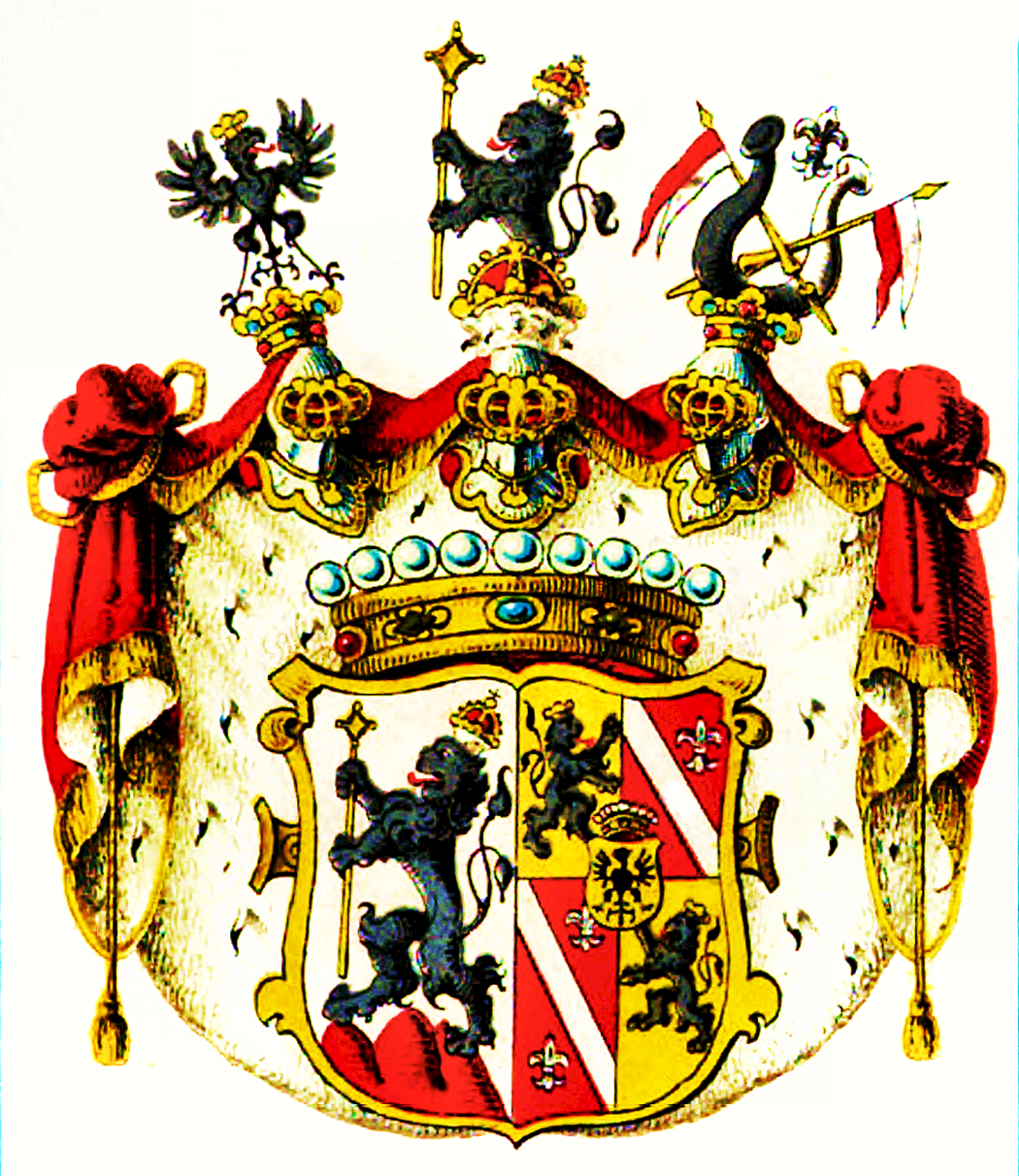
Coat of arms of the Zierotin-Lilgenau family

According to romantic legend, the Zierotins were the offspring of Prince Oleg of Drelinia, brother of Vladimir I of Kiev, and therefore the family uses in its coat of arms a royal crown (or more properly the crown of Grand Prince) and princely mantling. The heraldic device is a blazon of arms in gules (red) with a lion sable (black), crowned, on three mountains argent (silver). The crest is the crowned lion rampant.

The ancestors of the family were the Bludov family. The oldest documented member of this family was Blud of Bludov, who was the burgrave of the castle in Přerov in 1213–1215. He had two sons, Oneš (1209–1249) and Viktor. He was the probable founder of Bludov that his family and then the Zierotin family have owned since time immemorial.

Members of the family were judges, governors, patrons of art and politicians. The most famous is Karel the Elder of Zierotin (1564–1636). He was head of the family in the times when the Zierotin family had the largest property in Moravia. He was highly educated, spoke several languages and was an able politician. He was a friend of Henry IV of France and brother-in-law of Albrecht von Wallenstein. For several years until 1614, he held the position of the Moravian governor.

Other notable members were Johan Karl of Zierotin (1719–1776), directeur des spectacles of Frederick II of Prussia and friend of Johann Sebastian Bach; Karel Emanuel of Zierotin (1850–1934), peer of the Austrian Empire and governor of Moravia (1900–1906); and Ladislav Velen of Zierotin (1579–1638), head of the uprising against the Habsburgs.

The male line of this family died out in 1985. The female line died out in 2016. There are two lines of the family that are not male line descendants of the founders of the family: Mornstein-Zierotin and Klinger-Zierotin. After the fall of the Communist rule in 1989, several properties were returned to Karel Mornstein-Zierotin, including Bludov Chateau.
