= Bludov (Šumperk District) =

Municipality in the Czech Republic

- Municipality
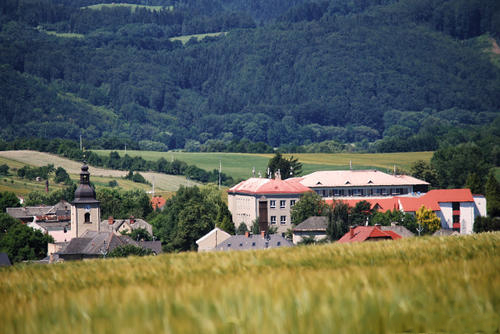
- General view of Bludov

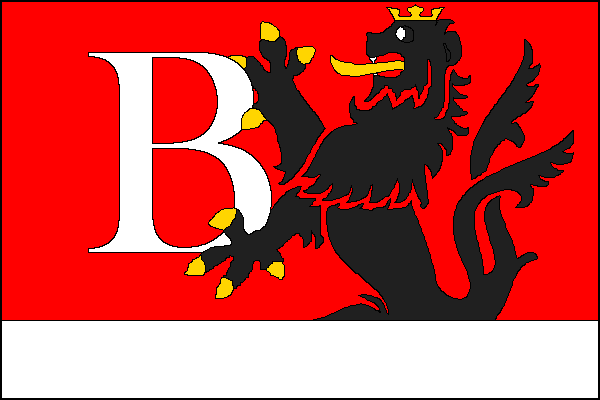
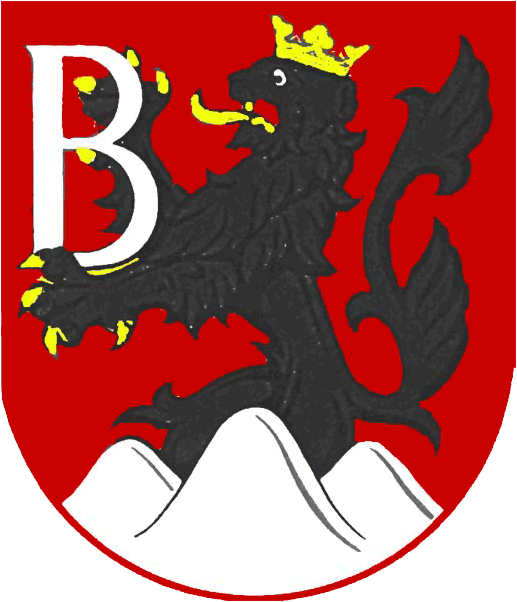
- Flag Coat of arms

- Location in the Czech Republic
- Coordinates: 49°56′27″N 16°55′43″E
- Country: Czech Republic
- Region: Olomouc
- District: Šumperk
- First mentioned: 1350

Area
  - Total: 16.68 km^{2} (6.44 sq mi)
- Elevation: 306 m (1,004 ft)

Population (2026-01-01)
  - Total: 2,972
  - Density: 178.2/km^{2} (461.5/sq mi)
- Time zone: UTC+1 (CET)
  - Summer (DST): UTC+2 (CEST)
- Postal code: 788 33
- Website: www.bludov.cz

Bludov (Czech pronunciation: [bludof]; German: Blauda) is a spa municipality and village in Šumperk District in the Olomouc Region of the Czech Republic. It has about 3,000 inhabitants.

== Etymology ==
The name is derived from the name of its probable founder called Blud, who became known as Blud of Bludov.

== Geography ==
Bludov is located about 4 kilometres (2 mi) southwest of Šumperk and 44 km (27 mi) northwest of Olomouc. The southwestern part of the municipal territory lies in the Mohelnice Depression and the northeastern part lies in the Hanušovice Highlands. The highest point is at 544 m (1,785 ft) above sea level. The Morava River partly forms the western border of the municipality, the Desná partly forms the eastern border.

== History ==
Bludov was probably established at the turn of the 12th and 13th century. Since its foundation, it was purely Czech village. Until the 19th century, it was an agricultural village. Blud of Bludov's son built a castle on the slope of the Háj Hill. The Bludov Castle was destroyed during the Bohemian–Hungarian War (1468–1478).

In the 15th century Bludov was owned by the lords of Kunštát, by the Waldstein family, and then by the Tunkl of Brníčko family, who built six large ponds near the village. The ponds were dried in the 19th century, because their maintenance did not pay off economically. In 1496, Bludov was acquired by the Zierotin family, who had built the Bludov Chateau.

During the second half of the 19th century, Bludov was industrialised. In 1929, the Bludov Spa was opened.

== Demographics ==
Historical population

Year	Pop.	±%
1869	2,171	—
1880	2,266	+4.4%
1890	2,273	+0.3%
1900	2,460	+8.2%
1910	2,682	+9.0%

Year	Pop.	±%
1921	2,604	−2.9%
1930	2,892	+11.1%
1950	2,485	−14.1%
1961	2,779	+11.8%
1970	2,736	−1.5%

Year	Pop.	±%
1980	3,131	+14.4%
1991	3,128	−0.1%
2001	3,189	+2.0%
2011	3,068	−3.8%
2021	2,946	−4.0%

Source: Censuses

== Economy ==
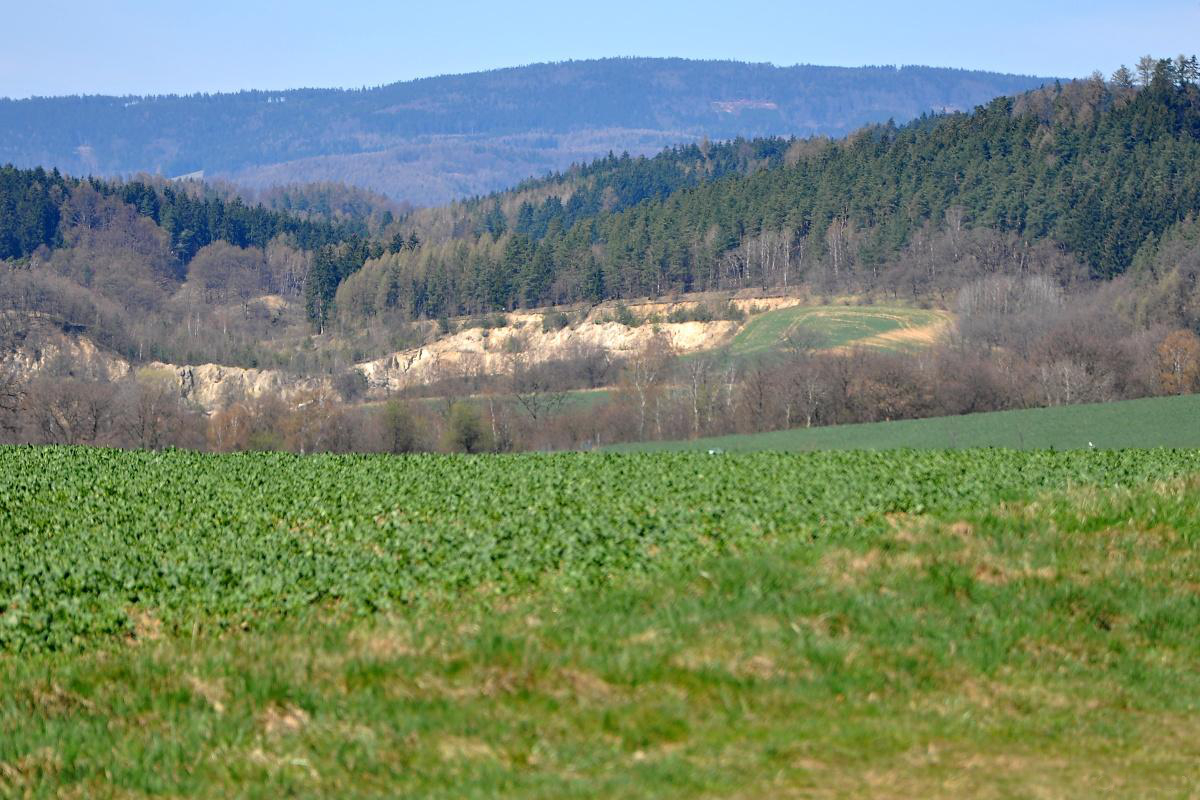
Nový Lom quarry

In the lowlands, corn, barley, wheat, oilseed rape, poppy, sugar beet, alfalfa and flax are grown and cattle and broilers raised.

Bludov Spa is focused on treatment of obesity and musculoskeletal disorders, using thermal mineral water containing sulphates, chlorides and sodium.

A quarry called Nový Lom is located on the northern outskirts of the village. There is occasional mining of a metamorphic rock known as bludovit, which contains rare minerals and is used decoratively.

Vlčí Důl, a natural reservoir complex with an area of 8,000 square metres (86,000 sq ft), is available for recreation and also serves to organise cultural and social events.

There is a small hydroelectric plant at Habermann's Mill.

== Transport ==
The I/44 road (the section from Šumperk to Zábřeh) runs through the southern part of the municipality.

Bludov is located on the railway lines Nezamyslice–Kouty nad Desnou via Prostějov, Olomouc and Šumperk, and Šumperk–Hanušovice.

== Sights ==
The Church of Saint George was built in 1837–1838. The current building replaced the old church built after 1588, from which the south wall was used for the new church.

The Church of the Corpus Christi is a pilgrimage site in the woods in the northern part of the municipality. At the end of the 17th century, a chapel was built on the site. In 1720–1724, it was rebuilt into the Baroque church. In 1835, it was rebuilt in the Neoclassical style.

The so-called Bludov Chateau is a valuable castle with a natural landscape park. In the 1990s, it was returned to the Mornstein-Zierotin family.

== Notable people ==
- Adolf Kašpar (1877–1934), painter and illustrator

== Twin towns – sister cities ==
Bludov is twinned with:

- Lehota pod Vtáčnikom, Slovakia
