= Jaroslav =

Slavic masculine given name

- Pronunciation: Czech: [ˈjaroslaf] Slovak: [ˈjarɔsɫau̯]
- Gender: masculine
- Language: Czech, Slovak

Origin
- Language: Slavic
- Origin: jar 'spring' + slav 'glory, fame'

Other names
- Related names: Jaroslava (feminine), Jarosław, Yaroslav

Jaroslav is a Czech and Slovak masculine given name. It is composed of the Slavic elements jar ('spring' 'might' 'ruler') and slav ('glory, fame').The name translates into English as Roderick.

The feminine form of the name is Jaroslava.

Jaroslav is equivalent to the Polish name Jarosław and the Ukrainian and Russian name Yaroslav.

== Notable people with the name ==
=== A ===
- Jaroslav Alexa (1949–2008), Czech athlete

=== B ===
- Jaroslav Bába (born 1984), Czech high jumper
- Jaroslav Babušiak (born 1984), Slovak alpine skier
- Jaroslav Balaštík (born 1979), Czech ice hockey player
- Jaroslav Balcar (1953–2015), Czechoslovak ski jumper
- Jaroslav Balík (1924–1996), Czechoslovak film director and screenwriter
- Jaroslav Baška (born 1975), Slovak politician
- Jaroslav Bašta (1948–2024), Czech politician and diplomat
- Jaroslav Beck (born 1988), Czech composer and entrepreneur
- Jaroslav Bednář (born 1976), Czech ice hockey player
- Jaroslav Beláň (born 1981), Slovak footballer
- Jaroslav Benák (born 1962), Czech ice hockey player
- Jaroslav Benda (1882–1970), Czech artist
- Jaroslav Beneš (born 1946), Czech photographer
- Jaroslav of Bezmíře, also known as Jaroslav of Benešov, 14th century Bohemian inquisitor and bishop
- Jaroslav Bílek (born 1971), Czech cyclist
- Jaroslav Bím (1931–2012), Czechoslovak gymnast
- Jaroslav Blahoš (1930–2018), Czech medical doctor
- Jaroslav Blažek (1896–1976), Czech cinematographer
- Jaroslav Bogdálek (1929–2022), Czech alpine skier
- Jaroslav Bohatý (born 1935), Czech long-distance runner
- Jaroslav Borovička (1931–1992), Czech footballer
- Jaroslav Boroš (born 1947), Slovak footballer
- Jaroslav Borák (born 1989), Czech footballer
- Jaroslav Bouček (1912–1987), Czech footballer
- Jaroslav Bořita of Martinice (1582–1649), Bohemian nobleman
- Jaroslav Brabec (1949–2018), Czech athlete
- Jaroslav Brejcha, Czechoslovak slalom canoeist
- Jaroslav Brož (cyclist) (1906–?), Czech Olympic cyclist
- Jaroslav Brož (long jumper) (1950–1975), Czech Olympic athlete
- Jaroslav Brožek (1923–2019), Czech artis and university professor
- Jaroslav Bulant (born 1964), Czech tennis player
- Jaroslav Bureš (born 1954), Czech lawyer and politician
- Jaroslav Burgr (1906–1986), Czech footballer
- Jaroslav Bžoch (born 1983), Czech politician

=== C ===
- Jaroslav Cardal (1919–2010), Czech cross-country skier
- Jaroslav Čejka (1936–2022), Czech dancer, comedian and actor
- Jaroslav Cejp (1924–2002), Czechoslovak footballer
- Jaroslav Čermák (1929–2011), Czech resistance fighter
- Jaroslav Čermák (painter) (1830–1878), Czech painter
- Jaroslav Černý (Egyptologist) (1898–1970), Czech egyptologist
- Jaroslav Černý (footballer) (born 1979), Czech footballer
- Jaroslav Černý (painter) (1904–1984), Czech painter
- Jaroslav Červený (1895–1950), Czechoslovak footballer
- Jaroslav Chalupský (born 1974), Czech politician
- Jaroslav Cháňa (1899–2000), Czechoslovak footballer
- Jaroslav Chlebek (born 1976), Slovak footballer
- Jaroslav Chmelař (born 2003), Czech ice hockey player
- Jaroslav Čihák (1891–1944), Austro-Hungarian army officer
- Jaroslav Cihlář (1924–2014), Czech cyclist

=== D ===
- Jaroslav Dietl (1929–1985), Czech screenwriter and playwright
- Jaroslav Dittrich (born 1982), Czech footballer
- Jaroslav Diviš (born 1986), Czech footballer
- Jaroslav Dočkal (1939–2021), Czech football player and manager
- Jaroslav Doubek (1931–2017), Czech ice skater
- Jaroslav Doubrava (1909–1960), Czech composer, painter, and pedagogue
- Jaroslav Drobný (footballer) (born 1979), Czech footballer
- Jaroslav Drobný (1921–2001), Czech tennis player
- Dominik Jaroslav Duka, (born 1943), Czech Catholic bishop
- Jaroslav Durych (1886–1962), Czech poet and writer
- Jaroslav Dušek (born 1961), Czech actor
- Jaroslav Dvořák (politician) (born 1957), Czech neurologist and politician
- Jaroslav Dvořák (weightlifter) (1896–?), Czech weightlifter

=== E ===
- Jaroslav Eliáš (1906–1962), Czechoslovak athlete
- Jaroslav Eminger (1886–1964), Czech military officer

=== F ===
- Jaroslav Falta (1951–2022), Czech motocross racer
- Jaroslav Feistauer (1909–?), Czech cross-country skier
- Jaroslav Ferianec (born 1970), Slovak sailor
- Jaroslav Fikejz (1927–2008), Czech athlete
- Jaroslav Filip (1949–2000), Slovak musician
- Jaroslav Findejs (born 1943), Czechoslovak footballer
- Jaroslav Flegr (born 1958), Czech biologist
- Jaroslav Foglar (1907–1999), Czech novelist
- Jaroslav Folda (born 1940), American medievalist
- Jaroslav Fragner (1898–1967), Czech architect
- Jaroslav Erik Frič (1949, Libina–2019), Czech poet, musician and publisher

=== G ===
- Jaroslav Gabro (1919–1980), American Catholic bishop
- Jaroslav Galko (born 1961), Slovak football player and manager
- Jaroslav Goll (1846–1929), Czech historian
- Jaroslav Gürtler (born 1954), Czech football manager

=== H ===
- Jaroslav Hainz (1883–1914/18), Czech tennis player
- Jaroslav Hájek (1926–1974), Czech mathematician
- Jaroslav Halák (born 1985), Slovak ice hockey player
- Jaroslav Handlíř (1888–1942), Czech politician and soldier
- Jaroslav Hanf (1888–1958), Czechoslovak equestrian
- Jaroslav Hatla (born 1973), Czech equestrian
- Jaroslav Havlíček (1896–1943), Czech novelist
- Jaroslav Hašek (1883–1923), Czech writer and journalist
- Jaroslav Hellebrand (born 1945), Czech rower
- Jaroslav Heyrovský (1890–1967), Czech chemist and inventor
- Jaroslav Hilbert (1871–1936), Czech dramatist and writer
- Jaroslav Hílek (born 1978), Slovak footballer
- Jaroslav Hlava (1855–1924), Czech anatomist and medical doctor
- Jaroslav Hlinka (born 1976), Czech ice hockey player
- Jaroslav Holík (1942–2015), Czech ice hockey player
- Jaroslav Holík (politician) (born 1953), Czech politician
- Jaroslav Hrabal (born 1974), Slovak footballer
- Jaroslav Hrbáček (1921–2010), Czech academic and zoologist
- Jaroslav Hřebík (born 1948), Czech football player and coach
- Jaroslav Hübl (ice hockey, born 1957), Czech ice hockey player
- Jaroslav Hübl (ice hockey, born 1982), Czech ice hockey player
- Jaroslav Huleš (1974–2004), Czech motorcycle racer
- Jaroslav Humpál (1916–?), Czechoslovak canoeist
- Jaroslav Hutka (born 1947), Czech musician and composer
- Jaroslav Hynek (born 1975), Czech football manager

=== J ===
- Jaroslav Jabrocký (born 1980), Slovak ice hockey player
- Jaroslav Jágr (born 1984), Czech ice hockey player
- Jaroslav Jahn (1865–1934), Czech paleontologist, mineralogist and geologist
- Jaroslav Jakubovič (born 1948), Czech jazz saxophonist
- Jaroslav Janda (born 1942), Czech alpine skier
- Jaroslav Janiš (born 1983), Czech race car driver
- Jaroslav Janus (born 1989), Slovak ice hockey player
- Jaroslav Jareš (1930–2016), Czech football player and manager
- Jaroslav Jašek (1946–2010), Czechoslovak orienteering competitor
- Jaroslav Jeroným Neduha (1945–2024), Czech singer-songwriter
- Jaroslav Jeřábek (born 1971), Slovak cyclist
- Jaroslav Ježek (chess player) (1926–1998), Czech chess player
- Jaroslav Ježek (composer) (1906–1942), Czech composer and conductor
- Jaroslav Ježek (designer) (1923–2002), Czech industrial designer
- Jaroslav Jílek (javelin thrower) (born 1989), Czech athlete
- Jaroslav Jílek (table tennis), Czechoslovak table tennis player
- Jaroslav Jirásek (1932–2012), Czech sprinter
- Jaroslav Jiřík (1939–2011), Czech ice hockey player
- Jaroslav Jirkovský (1891–1971), Czechoslovak ice hockey player
- Jaroslav Jokeľ (born 1970), Slovak weightlifter
- Jaroslav Josef Polívka (1886–1960), Czech engineer
- Jaroslav Jurka (born 1949), Czech fencer
- Jaroslav Just (1883–1928), Czech tennis player

=== K ===
- Jaroslav Kabeš (1896–1964), Czechoslovak economist and politician
- Jaroslav Kacmarcyk (1885–1944), Polish and Lemko politician
- Jaroslav Kadavý (1912–2000), Czech cross-country skier
- Jaroslav Kalla (born 1979), Czech ice hockey player
- Jaroslav Kantůrek (born 1953), Czech basketball player
- Jaroslav Kasprisin (born 1990), Slovak footballer
- Jaroslav Kasík (born 1983), Czech ice hockey player
- Jaroslav Katriňák (born 1966), Slovak motorcycle racer
- Jaroslav Kentoš (born 1974), Slovak footballer
- Jaroslav Kmiť (born 1979), Slovak ice hockey player
- Jaroslav Knotek (1912–1996), Czech athlete
- Jaroslav Kocián (1883–1950), Czech violinist and composer
- Jaroslav Kolbas (born 1985), Slovak footballer
- Jaroslav Kollinger (1905–1949), Czech gymnast
- Jaroslav Kolínek (born 1972), Czech footballer
- Jaroslav Koma (born 1985), Slovak ice hockey player
- Jaroslav Konečný (boxer) (born 1976), Czech boxer
- Jaroslav Konečný (handballer) (1945–2017), Czechoslovak handball player
- Jaroslav Kopet (born 1952), Czech volleyball player
- Jaroslav Kopřiva (born 1990), Czech bobsledder
- Jaroslav Kořán (1940–2017), Czech translator
- Jaroslav Korbela (born 1957), Czech ice hockey player
- Jaroslav Košnar (1930–1985), Slovak footballer
- Jaroslav Kostelný (born 1985), Slovak footballer
- Jaroslav Koutecký (1922–2005), Czech chemist and university professor
- Jaroslav Kovář (1934–2015), Czech athlete
- Jaroslav Kožešník (1907–1985), Czech scientist and politician
- Jaroslav Kozlík (1907–2012), Czech educator
- Jaroslav Kracík (born 1983), Czech ice hockey player
- Jaroslav Kraft (1940–2007), Czech palaeontologist
- Jaroslav Král (born 1948), Czechoslovak boxer
- Jaroslav Kravárik (born 1941), Slovak footballer
- Jaroslav Krček (born 1939), Czech conductor, composer and musician
- Jaroslav Krejčí (1892–1956), Czech lawyer
- Jaroslav Krejčí (sociologist) 1916–2014), Czech-British sociologist, historian and university professor
- Jaroslav Křička (1882–1969), Czech composer, conductor, and music teacher
- Jaroslav Kristek (born 1980), Czech ice hockey player
- Jaroslav Kříž (born 1955), Czech judoka
- Jaroslav Krombholc (1918–1983), Czechoslovak conductor
- Jaroslav Krupicka (born 1946), Czech ice hockey player
- Jaroslav Kubera (1947–2020), Czech politician
- Jaroslav Kubečka (1934–2025), Slovak politician
- Jaroslav Kučera (1929–1991), Czech cinematographer
- Jaroslav Kudrna (born 1975), Czech ice hockey player
- Jaroslav Kulhavý (born 1985), Czech mountain biker
- Jaroslav Kurzweil (1926–2022), Czech mathematician
- Jaroslav Kůs (born 1990), Czech ice hockey player
- Jaroslav Kvapil (1868–1950), Czech poet, playwright and theatre director
- Jaroslav Kvapil (composer) (1892–1958), Czech composer and conductor
- Jaroslav Kyzlink (born 1973), Czech conductor

=== L ===
- Jaroslav Levinský (born 1981), Czech tennis player
- Antonín Jaroslav Liehm (1924–2020), Czech publicist and writer
- Jaroslav Lukeš (born 1912), Czech skier
- Jaroslav Lyčka (born 1951), Czech ice hockey player

=== M ===
- Jaroslav Machač (born 1926), Czechoslovak speedway rider
- Jaroslav Machovec (born 1986), Slovak footballer
- Jaroslav Mach (1887–?), Czech sports shooter
- Jaroslav Makohin (born 1976), Czech diver
- Jaroslav Makovec (born 1960), Czech race walker
- Jaroslav Malátek (1923–2014), Czech painter
- Jaroslav Malina (anthropologist) (born 1945), Czech archaeologist and anthropologist
- Jaroslav Malina (scenographer) (1937–2016), Czech scenographer
- Jaroslav Mareš (1937–2021), Czech biologist, traveller and writer
- Jaroslav Markovič (born 1985), Slovak ice hockey player
- Jaroslav Marvan (1901–1974), Czech actor
- Jaroslav Marx (born 1971), Czech footballer
- Jaroslav Masrna (born 1950), Slovak footballer
- Jaroslav Matoušek (born 1951), Czech sprinter
- Jaroslav Melichárek (born 1977), Slovak rally driver
- Jaroslav Mihalík (born 1994), Slovak footballer
- Jaroslav Mikoška (1933–1991), Czech gymnast
- Jaroslav Miller (born 1971), Czech historian and university professor
- Jaroslav Modrý (born 1971), Czech ice hockey player
- Jaroslav Mostecký (1963–2020), Czech writer
- Jaroslav Moučka (ice hockey) (born 1992), Czech ice hockey player
- Jaroslav Moučka (1923–2009), Czech actor
- Jaroslav Müller (1901–?), Czech swimmer
- Jaroslav Mysliveček (1908–?), Czech rower

=== N ===
- Jaroslav Naď (born 1981), Slovak politician
- Jaroslav Narkevič (born 1962), Lithuanian politician
- Jaroslav Navrátil (footballer) (born 1991), Czech footballer
- Jaroslav Navrátil (sport shooter) (born 1943), Czech Olympic shooter
- Jaroslav Navrátil (tennis) (born 1957), Czechoslovak tennis player
- Jaroslav Nedvěd (born 1969), Czech ice hockey player
- Jaroslav Němec (born 1954), Czech footballer
- Jaroslav Nešetřil (born 1946), Czech mathematician
- Jaroslav Nesvadba (born 1982), Czech footballer
- Jaroslav Netolička (born 1954), Czech footballer
- Jaroslav Nikodým (born 1950), Czech judoka

=== O ===
- Jaroslav Obšut (born 1976), Slovak ice hockey player
- Jaroslav Olejár (1959–2026), Slovak footballer
- Jaroslav Olesnitsky (1875–1933), Ukrainian diplomat, politician, and lawyer
- Jaroslav Olša Jr. (born 1964), Czech diplomat and writer
- Jaroslav Oplt, Czechoslovak rower
- Jaroslav Otevřel (born 1968), Czech ice hockey player
- Jaroslav Otruba (1916–2007), Czech architect and urban planner

=== P ===
- Jaroslav Panuška (1872–1958), Czech painter and illustrator
- Jaroslav Papiernik (1952–2002), Slovak handball player
- Jaroslav Papoušek (1929–1995), Czech film director
- Jaroslav Pavelka (born 1993), Czech ice hockey player
- Jaroslav Pavlů (1936–2024), Czechoslovak-Italian ice hockey player
- Jaroslav Paška (1954–2021), Slovak politician
- Jaroslav Pekař (born 1944), Czech sports shooter
- Jaroslav Pelikan (1923–2006), American theological scholar
- Jaroslav Penc (born 1948), Czech volleyball player
- Jaroslav Peregrin (born 1957), Czech philosopher
- Jaroslav Perner (1869–1947), Czech paleontologist
- Jaroslav Pešán (1912–1972), Czechoslovak soldier and resistance fighter
- Jaroslav Pitner (1926–2009), Czech ice hockey coach
- Jaroslav Pížl (born 1961), Czech poet and writer
- Jaroslav Plašil (born 1982), Czech footballer
- Jaroslav Plesl (born 1974), Czech actor
- Jaroslav Plíhal (1936–1997), Czech athlete
- Jaroslav Pollert (canoeist, born 1943), Czech slalom canoer
- Jaroslav Pollert (canoeist, born 1971), Czech slalom canoer
- Jaroslav Pollák (1947 –2020), Slovak footballer
- Jaroslav Pospíšil (born 1981), Czech tennis player
- Jaroslav Pospíšil (canoeist) (born 1973), Czech slalom canoeist
- Jaroslav Poupa, Czechoslovak sprint canoer
- Jaroslav Pouzar (born 1952), Czech ice hockey player
- Jaroslav Prekop (born 1979), Slovak footballer
- Jaroslav Prišcák (born 1956), Czechoslovak long and triple jumper
- Jaroslav Procházka, Czech middle-distance runner
- Jaroslav Průcha (1898–1963), Czech actor
- Jaroslav Průšek (1906–1980), Czech sinologist
- Jaroslav Pušbauer (1901–1976), Czechoslovak ice hockey player

=== R ===
- Jaroslav Radil, Czechoslovak slalom canoeist
- Jaroslav Radoň (born 1986), Czech sprint canoeist
- Jaroslav Řezáč (1886–1974), Czech ice hockey player
- Jaroslav Řídký (1897–1956), Czech composer and conductor
- Jaroslav Romanchuk (born 1966), Belarusian economist
- Jaroslav Róna (born 1957), Czech sculptor
- Jaroslav Rošický (1884–1942), Czech army officer
- Jaroslav Rössler (1902–1990), Czech photographer
- Jaroslav Lev of Rožmitál (c. 1425–1486), Bohemian nobleman
- Jaroslav Rudiš (born 1972), Czech writer, journalist and musician
- Jaroslav Rudnyckyj (1910–1995), Ukrainian-Canadian linguist and lexicographer
- Jaroslav Rygl (born 1970), Czech orienteering competitor

=== S ===
- Jaroslav Šabata (1927–2012), Czech political scientist, psychologist, and dissident
- Jaroslav Sadílek (1913–1993), Czech figure skater
- Jaroslav Šafránek (1890–1957), Czech physicist
- Jaroslav Šajtar (1921–2003), Czech chess player
- Jaroslav Sakala (born 1969), Czech jumper
- Jaroslav Šaršok (born 1990), Czech ice hockey player
- Jaroslav Satoranský (born 1939), Czech actor
- Jaroslav Šedivec (born 1981), Czech footballer
- Jaroslav Šedivý (1929–2023), Czech politician
- Jaroslav Erno Šedivý (born 1947), Czech drummer
- Jaroslav Seifert (1901–1986), Czech writer, poet and journalist
- Jaroslav Šerých (1928–2014), Czech painter, printmaker and illustrator
- Jaroslav Ševčík (born 1965), Czech ice hockey player
- Jaroslav Sieger, Czechoslovak sprint canoer
- Jaroslav Šifer (1895–1982), Yugoslav footballer
- Jaroslav Šilhavý (born 1961), Czech football player and manager
- Jaroslav Šíp (1930–2014), Czech basketball player and coach
- Jaroslav Šír (born 1923), Czechoslovak soldier and skier
- Jaroslav Škarvada (1924–2010), Czech Catholic bishop
- Jaroslav Škarvan (1944–2022), Czechoslovak handball player
- Jaroslav Skobla (1899–1959), Czech weightlifter
- Jaroslav Skála (1916–2007), Czech psychiatrist
- Jaroslav Skála (basketball) (born 1954), Czech basketball player
- Jaroslav Šlajs (born 1942), Czechoslovak boxer
- Jaroslav Slávik (born 1976), Slovak luger
- Jaroslav Šmíd (born 1955), Czech volleyball player
- Jaroslav Souček (1935–2006), Czech opera singer
- Jaroslav Soukup (born 1982), Czech biathlete
- Jaroslav Šourek (1927–2003), Czechoslovak long-distance runner
- Jaroslav Špaček (born 1974), Czech ice hockey player
- Jaroslav Špillar (1869–1917), Czech painter
- Jaroslav Špindler (1890–1965), Bohemian-Austrian footballer
- Jaroslav Spišiak (born 1963), Slovak politician
- Jaroslav Šrámek (1929–2015), Czechoslovak fighter pilot and military commander
- Jaroslav Stančo (1949–2011), Czech volleyball player
- Jaroslav Staněk (born 1940), Czechoslovak table tennis player
- Jaroslav Starosta (1937–2022), Czech rower
- Jaroslav Starý (fencer) (died 1989), Czech fencer
- Jaroslav Starý (footballer) (born 1988), Czech footballer
- Jaroslav Šťastný (1936–2004), Czech gymnast
- Jaroslav Stodola, Czech serial killer
- Jaroslav Štork (1909–1980), Czechoslovak racewalker
- Jaroslav Stránský (1899–1945), Czech ice hockey player
- Jaroslav Suchý (born 1971), Czech figure skater
- Jaroslav Švach (1973–2020), Czech footballer
- Jaroslav Svejkovský (born 1976), Czech ice hockey player and coach
- Jaroslav Svoboda (skier) (born 1944), Czech skier
- Jaroslav Svoboda (born 1980), Czech ice hockey player
- Jaroslav Svozil (born 1993), Czech footballer
- Jaroslav Svěchota (1941–2004), Slovak lawyer and politician
- Jaroslav Sysel (1908–1989), Czech wrestler

=== T ===
- Jaroslav Tesař (born 1986), Czech footballer
- Jaroslav Tetiva (1932–2021), Czech basketball player
- Jaroslav Timko (born 1965), Slovak footballer
- Jaroslav Tomáš (1949–2016), Czech volleyball player
- Jaroslav Tuček (1882–?), Bohemian fencer
- Jaroslav Tůma (born 1956), Czech organist
- Jaroslav Týfa, Bohemian wrestler

=== U ===
- Jaroslav Uhlíř (born 1945), Czech composer and pianist

=== V ===
- Jaroslav Vacek (1943–2017), Czech academic
- Jaroslav Vajda (1919–2008), American hymnwriter
- Jaroslav Váňa, Czechoslovak slalom canoeist
- Jaroslav Vaněk (1930–2017), Czech-American economist and university professor
- Jaroslav Veis (born 1946), Czech journalist and writer
- Jaroslav Vejvoda (1920–1996), Czech football player and manager
- Jaroslav Velinský (1932–2012), Czech writer and musician
- Jaroslav Veselý (born 1937), Czech sports shooter
- Jaroslav Věšín (1860–1915), Czech painter
- Jaroslav Vítek (1915–1966), Czechoslovak athlete
- Jaroslav Vlach (born 1992), Czech ice hockey player
- Jaroslav Vlček (footballer) (1900–1967), Czech footballer
- Jaroslav Vlček (politician) (born 1952), Czech politician
- Jaroslav Vogel (1894–1970), Czech conductor, composer and writer
- Jaroslav Vojta (1888–1970), Czech actor
- Jaroslav Volak (1915–?), Austrian handball player
- Jaroslav Volek (1923–1989), Czech musicologist
- Jaroslav Volf (born 1979), Czech slalom canoeist
- Jaroslav Volf (ice hockey) (1933–1990), Czech ice hockey player
- Jaroslav Votruba (born 1939), Czech figure skater
- Jaroslav Vožniak (1933–2005), Czech painter and printmaker
- Jaroslav Vrábel (born 1971), Czech footballer
- Jaroslav Vrchlický (1853–1912), Czech poet
- Jaroslav Vyhlíd, Czechoslovak slalom canoeist
- Jaroslav Vykoupil (1898–1976), Czechoslovak sprinter

=== W ===
- Jaroslav Walter (1939–2014), Czechoslovak ice hockey player
- Jaroslav Weigel (1931–2019), Czech actor, writer and playwright

=== Z ===
- Jaroslav Zajíček (1920–2002), Czech cross-country skier
- Jaroslav Záruba (1907–1945), Czechoslovak military officer
- Jaroslav Zelený (born 1992), Czech footballer
- Jaroslav Zeman (born 1962), Czech wrestler
- Jaroslav Žitňanský (born 1971), Slovak discus thrower
- Jaroslav Zvěřina (1942–2026), Czech politician and sexologist

== See also ==
- Jaroslav (Pardubice District), a municipality and village in the Czech Republic
- Jaroslava, feminine form of the name
- Jarosław (given name)
- Yaroslav
- Slavic names
