= Jaroslav Ježek =

Jaroslav Ježek may refer to:

- Jaroslav Ježek (composer) (1906–1942), Czech composer and conductor
- Jaroslav Ježek (designer) (1923–2002), Czech industrial designer, nephew of the composer
- Jaroslav Ježek (chess player) (1926–1998), Czech chess player
