= Stary =

Stary is a surname. Notable people with the surname include:

- Rob Stary, Australian criminal defence lawyer
- Jaroslav Starý (died 1989), Czech fencer
- Jaroslav Starý (born 1988), Czech footballer
