= Jaroslav Starý =

Jaroslav Starý may refer to:

- Jaroslav Starý (fencer) (died 1989), Czech fencer
- Jaroslav Starý (footballer) (born 1988), Czech footballer
