= Ježek (surname) =

Ježek (feminine Ježková) is a Czech surname meaning hedgehog. Notable people include:

- Jaromír Ježek (born 1986), Czech judoka
- Jaroslav Ježek (1906–1942), Czech composer
- Jaroslav Ježek (1923–2002), Czech designer
- Jaroslav Ježek (1926–1998), Czech chess player
- Jiří Ježek (born 1974), Czech cyclist and Paralympian
- Josef Ježek, Czech politician
- Kenneth Jezek, American actor, dancer
- Linda Jezek (born 1960), American swimmer
- Patrik Ježek (born 1976), Czech football (soccer) midfielder
- Petr Ježek, Czech politician
- Robert Jezek, Canadian actor
- Stanislav Ježek (born 1976), Czech slalom canoer
- Václav Ježek (1923–1995), Czech football coach
