= Chlebek =

Chlebek is a Slavic surname. It is a metonymic occupational surname derived from the word chleb, "bread". Notable people with the surname include:

- Ed Chlebek
- Jaroslav Chlebek
