= Hrbáček =

Hrbáček or Hrbacek is a surname. Notable people with the surname include:

- Dean A. Hrbacek, American lawyer and politician
- Jaroslav Hrbáček (1921–2010), Czech hydrobiologist
- Karel Hrbacek, mathematician
