= Ježek =

Ježek may refer to:

People:

- Frane Milčinski, a Slovene writer that used the pen name Ježek
- Ježek (surname), various people with the surname Ježek

Other:

- 27132 Ježek, a main belt asteroid
- Czech hedgehog, a static anti-tank obstacle defence
