= Moučka =

Moučka (feminine Moučková) is a Czech surname. Notable people with the surname include:

- Jaroslav Moučka (1923–2009), Czech actor
- Jaroslav Moučka (ice hockey) (born 1992), Czech ice hockey player
- Jitka Moučková (born 1979), Czech actress
