= Jaroslava =

- Pronunciation: Czech: [ˈjaroslava] Slovak: [ˈjarɔsɫava]
- Gender: female
- Language: Czech, Slovak

Origin
- Language: Slavic
- Origin: jar ("strong, fierce") + slav ("glory, fame")

Other names
- Variant form: Yaroslava (Ukrainian / Russian form)
- Related names: Jaroslav

Jaroslava is a Slavic feminine given name used in the Czech and Slovak languages. It is the feminine form of Jaroslav, composed of the Slavic elements jar meaning "strong, fierce" and slav meaning "glory, fame".

The Ukrainian and Russian form of the name is Yaroslava, the Polish form is Jarosława.

Notable people with the name Jaroslava include:

- Jaroslava Adamová (1925–2012), Czech actress
- Jaroslava Bajerová (1910–1995), Czech gymnast
- Jaroslava Bajerová (volleyball) (born 1971), Czech volleyball player
- Jaroslava Blažková (1933–2017), Slovak novelist and journalist
- Jaroslava Brychtová (1924–2020), Czech glass artist and sculptor
- Jaroslava Bukvajová (born 1975), Slovak cross country skier
- Jaroslava Fabiánová (born 1965), Czech serial killer
- Jaroslava Havlová, Czechoslovak slalom canoeist
- Jaroslava Jehličková (born 1942), Czech middle-distance runner
- Jaroslava Komárková (1927–2010), Czech athlete
- Jaroslava Korol (1954–2009), Ukrainian painter
- Jaroslava Lutz, Czechoslovak slalom canoeist
- Jaroslava Maxová (born 1957), Czech opera singer and vocal coach
- Jaroslava Mihočková (born 1971), Slovak table tennis player
- Jaroslava Moserová (1930–2006), Czech politician and diplomat
- Jaroslava Muchová (1909–1986), Czech painter
- Jaroslava Obermaierová (born 1946), Czech actress
- Jaroslava Pencová (born 1990), Slovak volleyball player
- Jaroslava Pešicová (1935–2015), Czech painter and printmaker
- Jaroslava Pokorná Jermanová (born 1970), Czech politician
- Jaroslava Pokorná (born 1948), Czech actress
- Jaroslava Rinnerová-Poláčková (born 1955), Czech footballer
- Jaroslava Schallerová (born 1956), Czech actress
- Jaroslava Sedláčková (born 1946), Czech gymnast
- Jaroslava Severová (born 1942), Czech printmaker
- Jaroslava Slavíčková (born 1953), Czech swimmer
- Jaroslava Valentová (born 1945), Czech athlete

== See also ==
- Jaroslav, masculine form of the name
- Yaroslava, Ukrainian and Russian form of the name
