= Podlesí (Příbram District) =

- Municipality
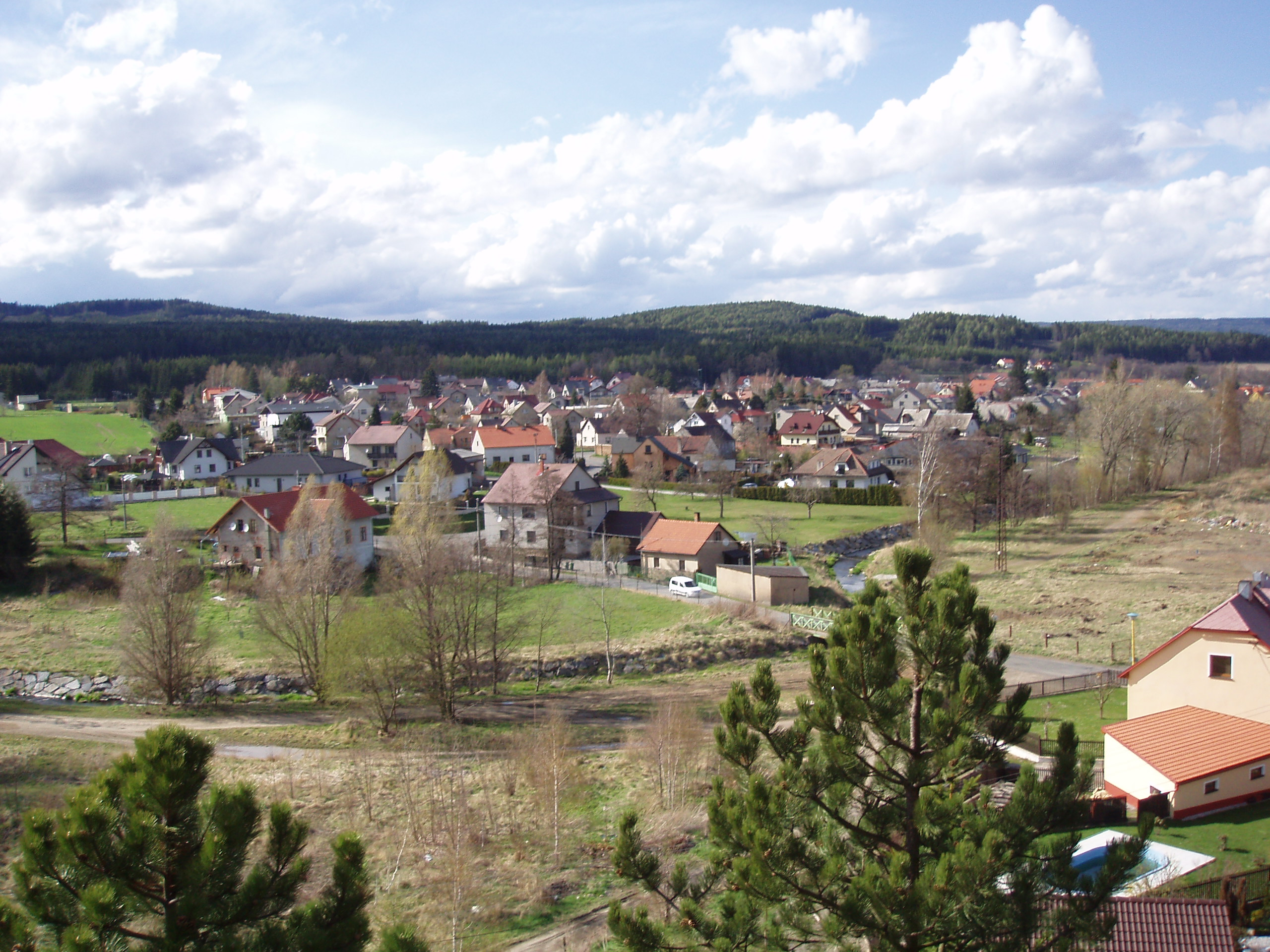
- View from the south

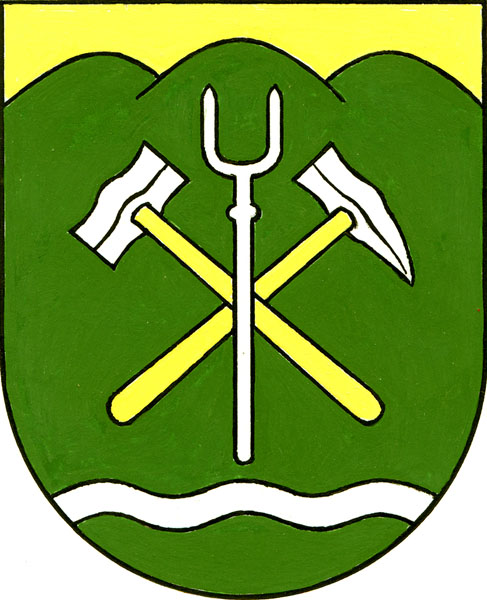
- Flag Coat of arms

- Location in the Czech Republic
- Coordinates: 49°41′25″N 13°58′55″E
- Country: Czech Republic
- Region: Central Bohemian
- District: Příbram
- First mentioned: 1527

Area
  - Total: 4.38 km^{2} (1.69 sq mi)
- Elevation: 503 m (1,650 ft)

Population (2026-01-01)
  - Total: 1,139
  - Density: 260/km^{2} (674/sq mi)
- Time zone: UTC+1 (CET)
  - Summer (DST): UTC+2 (CEST)
- Postal code: 261 01
- Website: www.obecpodlesi.cz

Podlesí is a municipality and village in Příbram District in the Central Bohemian Region of the Czech Republic. It has about 1,100 inhabitants.

== Etymology ==
The Czech word podlesí (from les = 'forest') denotes an area near a forest.

== Geography ==
Podlesí is located about 47 km (29 mi) southwest of Prague and is urbanistically fused with the neighbouring town of Příbram. It lies in the Brdy Highlands. The highest point is the hill Dubová hora at 627 m (2,057 ft) above sea level. The Litavka River forms the eastern municipal border and separates the municipality from Příbram.

== History ==
The first written mention of Podlesí is from 1527. The history of the village was connected with the mining of silver and iron ores, and agriculture had only marginal importance.

== Demographics ==
Historical population

Year	Pop.	±%
1869	1,195	—
1880	1,404	+17.5%
1890	1,232	−12.3%
1900	1,386	+12.5%
1910	1,302	−6.1%

Year	Pop.	±%
1921	1,035	−20.5%
1930	1,450	+40.1%
1950	992	−31.6%
1961	1,084	+9.3%
1970	1,032	−4.8%

Year	Pop.	±%
1980	934	−9.5%
1991	837	−10.4%
2001	848	+1.3%
2011	1,002	+18.2%
2021	1,066	+6.4%

Source: Censuses

== Transport ==
There are no railways or major roads passing through the municipality.

== Sights ==
There are no protected cultural monuments in the municipality. In the centre of Podlesí is a small chapel.

== Notable people ==
- Jaroslav Ježek (1923–2002), industrial designer
