= Milan Nakonečný =

Czech psychologist (1932–2025)

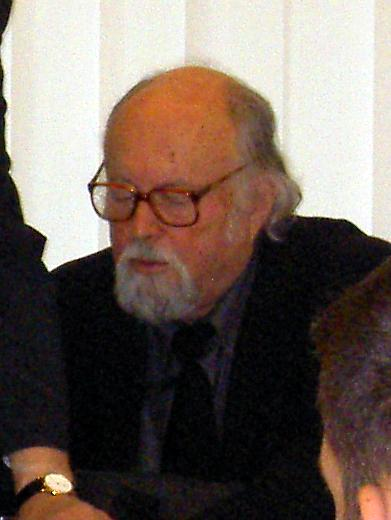
- Born: 8 February 1932; Horažďovice, Czechoslovakia
- Died: 4 December 2025 (aged 93); Tábor, Czech Republic
- Education: Charles University
- Occupations: Psychologist, historian

Milan Nakonečný (8 February 1932 – 4 December 2025) was a Czech psychologist, professor of psychology and historian. During the normalization, Nakonečný was banned from teaching and publishing.

Nakonečný died on 4 December 2025, at the age of 93.

== Books (selected) ==
- Motivace lidského chování (1997) ISBN 80-200-0592-7
- Psychologie osobnosti (1998) ISBN 80-200-0628-1
- Encyklopedie obecné psychologie (1997) ISBN 80-200-0625-7
- Lexikon magie (1993) ISBN 80-237-0090-1
- Lexikon psychologie (1995) ISBN 80-85255-74-X
- Novodobý český hermetismus (1995) ISBN 80-85255-85-5
- Psychologie osobnosti (1995) ISBN 80-200-0525-0
- Základy psychologie osobnosti (1993) ISBN 80-85603-34-9
- Úvod do sociální psychologie
- Motivace pracovního jednání a její řízení (1992) ISBN 80-85603-01-2
- Emoce a motivace (1973)
- Sociální psychologie (1970)
- Martinismus (1991) ISBN 80-900802-1-9
- Základní otázky psychologie (1968)
- Sociální psychologie (1999) ISBN 80-200-0690-7
- Základy psychologie (1998) ISBN 80-200-0689-3
- Průvodce dějinami psychologie (1995) ISBN 80-85937-23-9
- Lidské emoce (2000) ISBN 80-200-0763-6
- Úvod do psychologie (2003) ISBN 80-200-0993-0
- Psychologie téměř pro každého (2004) ISBN 80-200-1198-6
- Sociální psychologie organizace (2005) ISBN 80-247-0577-X
- Vlajka: k historii a ideologii českého nacionalismu (2001) ISBN 80-86183-24-6
- Český fašismus (2006) ISBN 80-86226-73-5
- Motivace lidského chování (1996) ISBN 80-200-0592-7
- Magie v historii, teorii a praxi (1999) ISBN 80-85255-12-X
- František Mareš (2007) ISBN 80-903582-6-8
