= Horažďovice =

Town in the Czech Republic

- Town
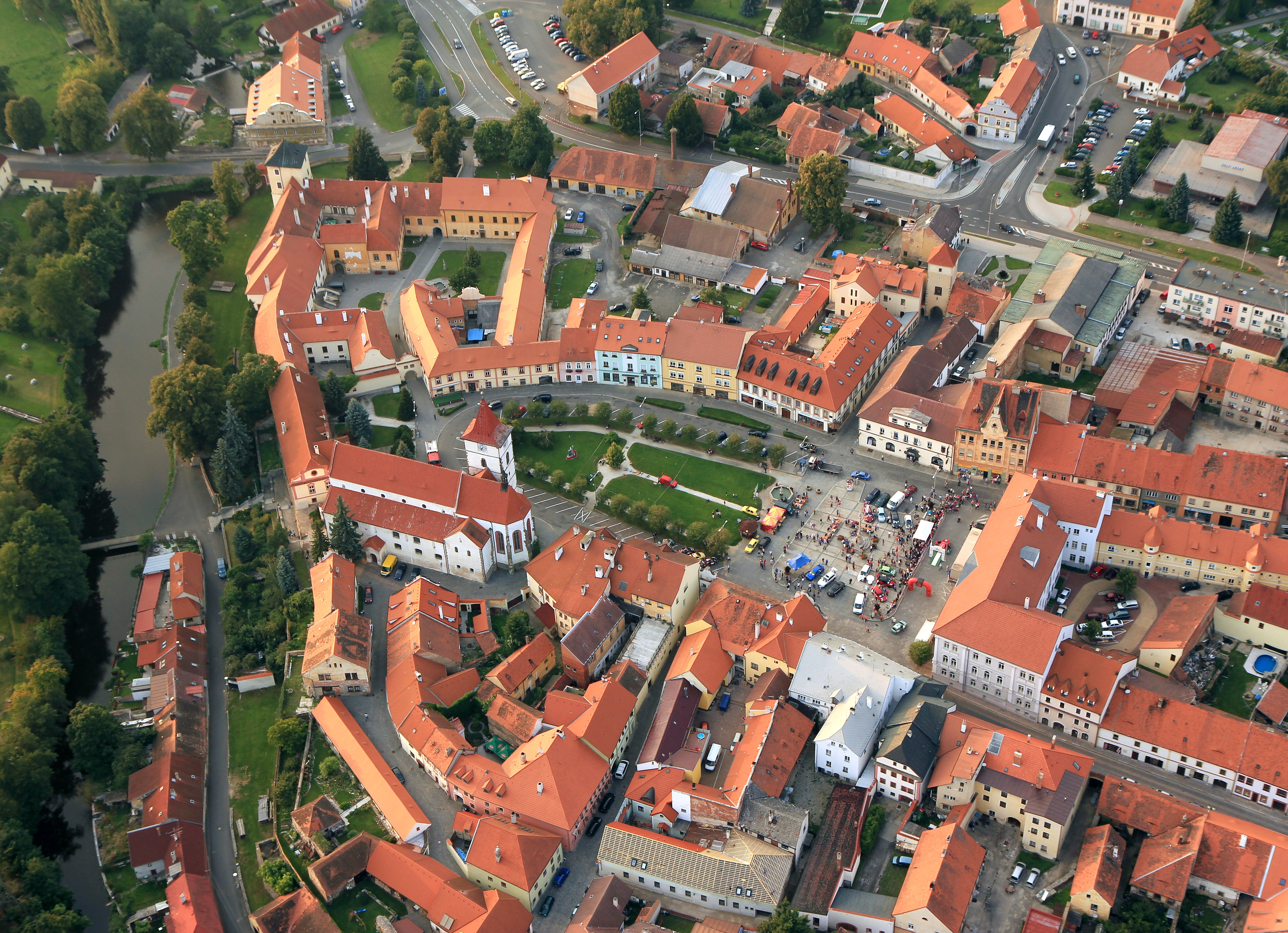
- Historic town centre

- Coat of arms

- Location in the Czech Republic
- Coordinates: 49°19′15″N 13°42′4″E
- Country: Czech Republic
- Region: Plzeň
- District: Klatovy
- First mentioned: 1251

Government
  - Mayor: Michael Forman

Area
  - Total: 43.04 km^{2} (16.62 sq mi)
- Elevation: 427 m (1,401 ft)

Population (2026-01-01)
  - Total: 5,056
  - Density: 117.5/km^{2} (304.3/sq mi)
- Time zone: UTC+1 (CET)
  - Summer (DST): UTC+2 (CEST)
- Postal code: 341 01
- Website: www.mesto-horazdovice.cz

Horažďovice (Czech pronunciation: [ˈɦoraʒɟovɪtsɛ]; German: Horaschdowitz) is a town in Klatovy District in the Plzeň Region of the Czech Republic. It has about 5,100 inhabitants. The town is located in the valley of the Otava River, on the border between the Blatná Uplands and Bohemian Forest Foothills.

Horažďovice became a town in 1292. The historic town centre is well preserved and is protected as an urban monument zone. The main landmark of the town is the Horažďovice Castle, which now houses the town museum.

== Administrative division ==
Horažďovice consists of eight municipal parts (in brackets population according to the 2021 census):

- Horažďovice (4,352)
- Babín (61)
- Boubín (105)
- Horažďovická Lhota (74)
- Komušín (82)
- Svaté Pole (50)
- Třebomyslice (162)
- Veřechov (101)

== Etymology ==
The name Horažďovice is derived from the personal name Gorazd, meaning "the village of Gorazd's people". The oldest name of Horažďovice was Gorazdějovice.

== Geography ==
Horažďovice is located about 30 kilometres (19 mi) east of Klatovy and 50 km (31 mi) southeast of Plzeň. It lies on the border between the Blatná Uplands and Bohemian Forest Foothills. The highest point is the hill Svitník at 591 m (1,939 ft) above sea level. The Otava River flows through the town. The territory is rich in fishponds.

== History ==
The early history of the territory was influenced by the establishment of the Prácheň gord on the nearby eponymous hill, which became the administrative centre of the historical region of Prácheňsko two centuries later. When the stronghold lost its significance, the centre was moved to Horažďovice.

The first written mention of Horažďovice is from 1251. It was a market village located on a trade route from Prague to Bavaria. It was owned by the Bavors of Strakonice, who had a Gothic castle and fortifications built. In 1292, King Wenceslaus II of Bohemia promoted Horažďovice to a town.

When Rudolf I of Bohemia was elected the King of Bohemia in 1306, Bavor III disagreed and rebelled against him, leading to him becoming besieged by the king's forces in Horažďovice from late June to early July 1307. Although the town capitulated shortly, the king died of gastrointestinal perforation at the gates of the town on the night of the capitulation.

After Horažďovice became property of Půta Švihovský of Rýzmberk in 1483, the town began to develop rapidly and prosper. He initiated development of administrative centres in the town vicinity such as the castles Rabí, Švihov and Velhartice. At the turn of the 15th and 16th centuries, a monastery was built behind the walls. In the 16th century, the town's development continued.

After the Battle of White Mountain, the properties of the Švihovský family were confiscated. The prosperity of Horažďovice ended with the Thirty Years' War, when the town was damaged by two large fires and twice looted by the Swedish army. The estate was sold to the Sternberg family in 1622. During their rule, the badly damaged castle was rebuilt and the monastery was enlarged during the Sternbergs rule in the 17th century.

Since the mid-19th century, walls and barbicans have been demolished in the northern part of Horažďovice. The Rummerskirch family owned Horažďovice from 1800 to 1843 and had a significant impact on the town by introducing pearl oyster farming. The collecting of pearls was organised by the gentry and was even attended by the Emperor Francis II. In the last pearl oyster harvest in 1944, 20,000 oysters were opened. After World War II, pearl oyster farming declined.

The last owners of Horažďovice were the Kinsky family, who bought it in 1843. In the second half of the 19th century, industry, trade and crafts developed, which was mainly influenced by the construction of the railway. The Kinskys founded an English park with many rare specimens of trees and plants on an island in the Otava, today called "Ostrov". They owned Horažďovice until 1945.

=== Jewish community ===
A Jewish presence in Horažďovice is believed to have existed from ancient times and the first written reference to the Jewish community is contained in the records of the Thirty Years' War (1618–1648) which indicate that 10 Jewish families were present in 1618. Archival evidence indicates that a Jewish cemetery existed in 1619. The first synagogue and Jewish school were founded in 1684. Officially banned from guilds, the early Jewish residents were farmers and traders. The earliest Jewish homes were concentrated in an area that is now called Prácheňská Street.

The Jews of Horažďovice were subject to orders and decrees that made life extraordinarily difficult throughout much of their entire history. In the 17th century, the number of Jewish residents in Horažďovice was limited to 10 families, partially in an effort to discourage competition for local tradesmen. Renting homes to Jews was strictly prohibited. In the late 17th century, an edict prohibited the Jews from allowing their cattle to graze with the communal herd. In 1687, Jews were targeted further with special taxes, prohibitions on carrying firearms and an edict requiring Jews to wear a yellow cloth badge.

The most far-reaching restrictions on Horažďovice's Jews were a series of measures known as the Family Laws (Familianten), introduced by Emperor Charles VI in 1726 and designed to limit Jewish population numbers. All marriages between Jews required the State's permission. No Jew under the age of 30 could marry and only the eldest male in each family was permitted to do so.

The repeal of the Family Laws in the mid 1800s launched what many regard as the "golden age" of Horažďovice Jewry. By 1890, the Jewish community reached its peak population of 300, about 9% of the total population. The influence of the Jewish community however was far greater as they were the driving force behind much of Horažďovice's Industrial Revolution.

In 1873, Samuel Kohn opened a matchstick factory that produced matches with colourful wax heads in decorative boxes for export to the east. On the adjacent property, a paper manufacturing plant owned by Rud, Firth and Bernard Gans was particularly important as it employed many workers and purchased straw from local farmers.

The best known Jewish business in Horažďovice was the vinegar and spirits company "Münz Brothers" founded by Simon Münz in 1831 and famed for its "Münzovka" whiskey. Expanded by his sons, Eduard and Karel Münz, and later by František and Pavel Münz, it became the largest distributor of spirits and vinegar in the region and was the sole distributor of almost all foreign wines and domestic mineral waters. In 1859, Heřman Katz founded what was to become the largest grocery mercantile house in southern Bohemia. In 1907, his son Otto Katz founded a wholesale grocery house which was as prosperous as his father's.

A significant number of Jews emigrated from Horažďovice from 1850 to 1938, particularly to the United States, Australia and South America. During World War II, the Jewish community was deported by German military authorities as part of the Final Solution. 93 Horažďovice Jews were transferred via railway to Terezín on 26 November 1942. Six Jews were deported by other means. Only seven survived. No Jewish community exists in Horažďovice today.

== Demographics ==
Historical population

| Year | Pop. | ±% |
|---|---|---|
| 1869 | 4,970 | — |
| 1880 | 5,603 | +12.7% |
| 1890 | 5,635 | +0.6% |
| 1900 | 5,485 | −2.7% |
| 1910 | 5,356 | −2.4% |

| Year | Pop. | ±% |
|---|---|---|
| 1921 | 5,210 | −2.7% |
| 1930 | 5,189 | −0.4% |
| 1950 | 4,624 | −10.9% |
| 1961 | 5,465 | +18.2% |
| 1970 | 5,714 | +4.6% |

| Year | Pop. | ±% |
|---|---|---|
| 1980 | 6,049 | +5.9% |
| 1991 | 5,820 | −3.8% |
| 2001 | 5,716 | −1.8% |
| 2011 | 5,474 | −4.2% |
| 2021 | 4,987 | −8.9% |

Source: Censuses

== Economy ==
The largest industrial employer in the town is Otavské strojírny, an engineering company.

The potato starch factory was founded in 1906 and still operates in the town, currently as the Lyckeby Amylex company. It is the largest producer of potato starch in the Czech Republic.

== Transport ==
The I/22 road (the section from Klatovy to Strakonice) runs through the town.

The railway line heading to Klatovy starts here. The town is served by two train stations: Horažďovice and Horažďovice předměstí.

== Culture ==
Horažďovice hosts an annual cultural event called Slavnosti Kaše ('porridge festivities'). Its name commemorates the siege of the town in 1307, during which King Rudolf I of Bohemia died. He was nicknamed "King Porridge" because of his moderate diet, atypical for a king. The festivities include performances by historical groups, a competition for the best porridge and the best porridge eater. The festivities have been held regularly since 2007.

== Sights ==
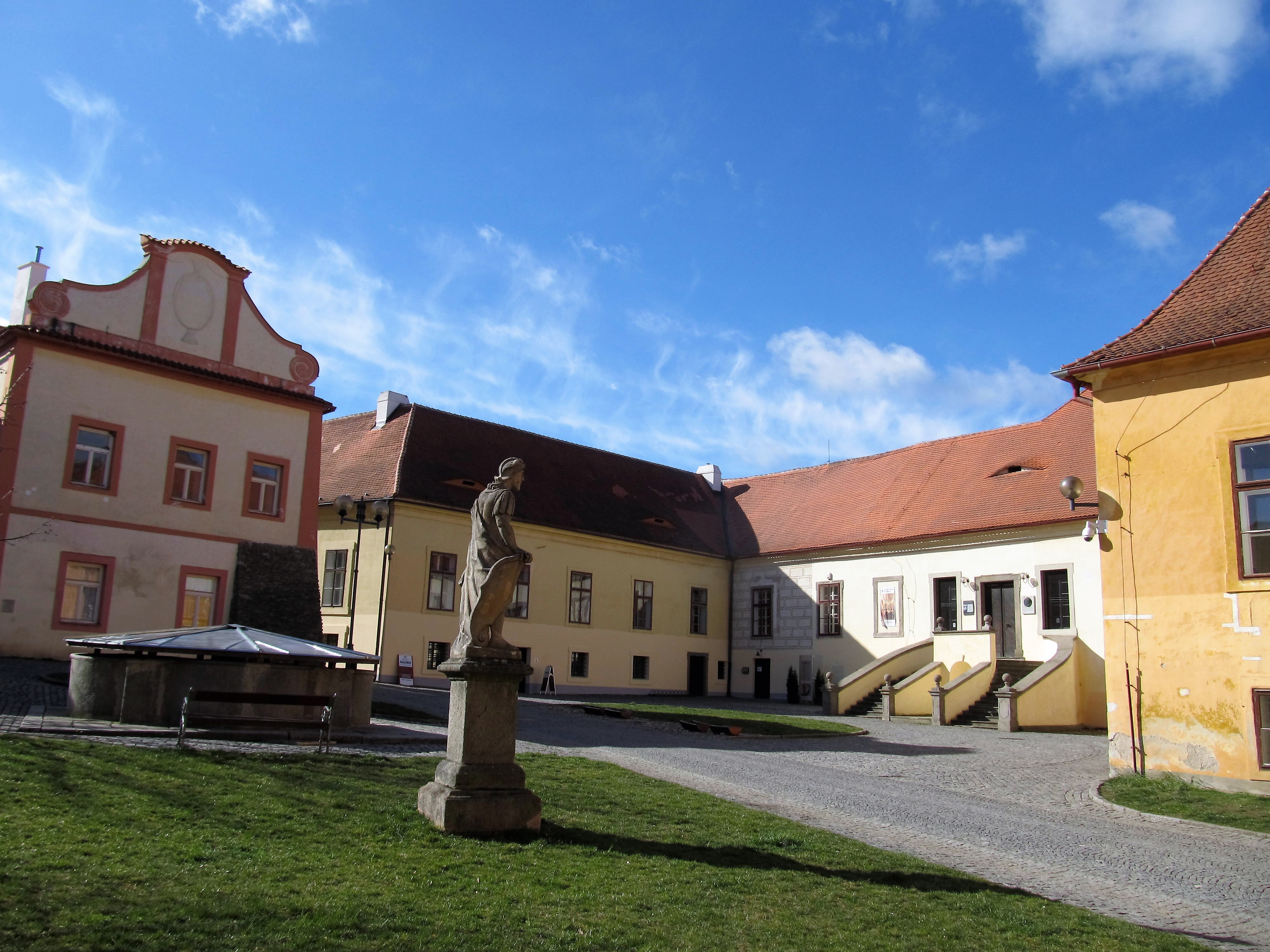
Castle courtyard

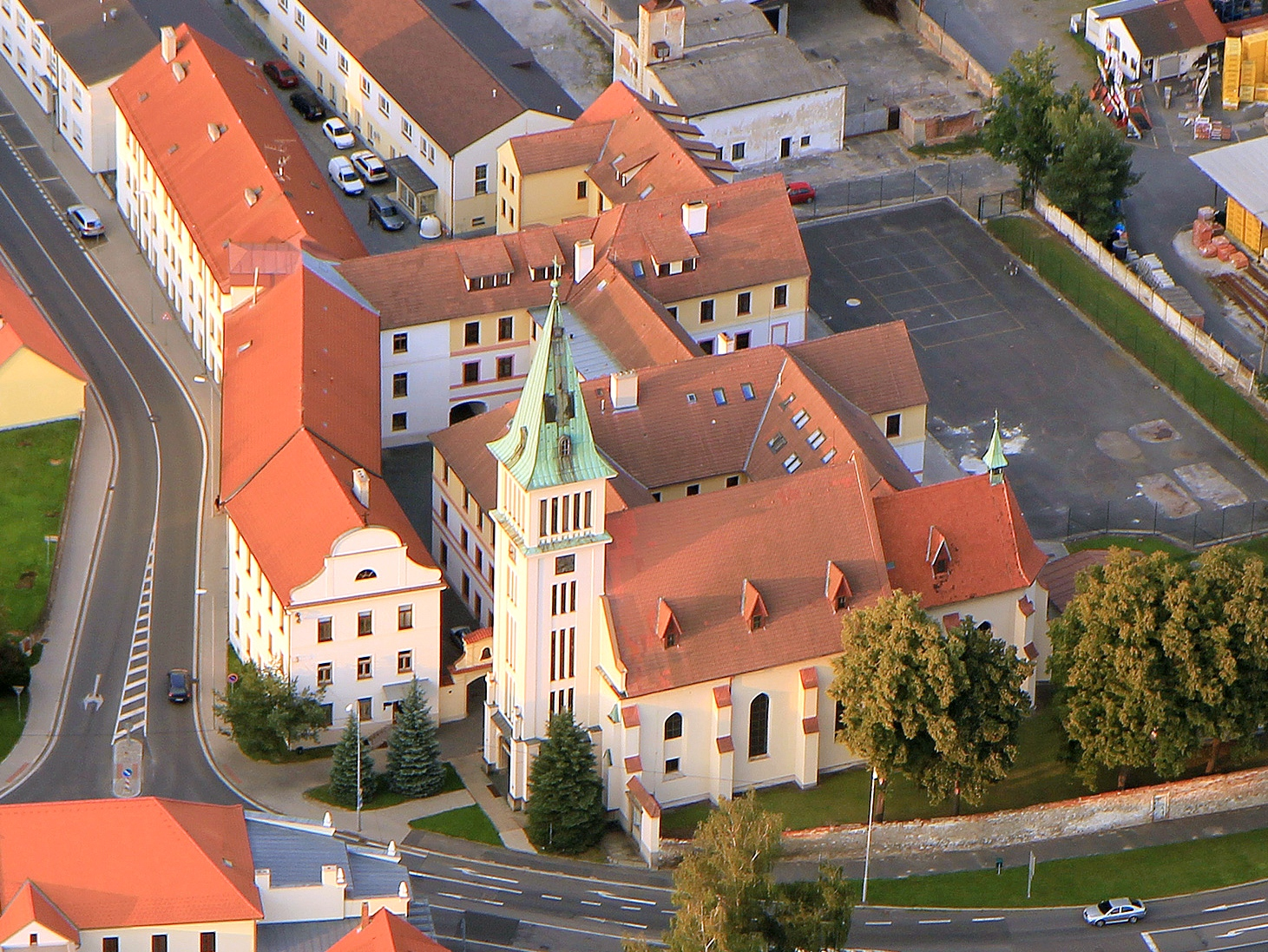
Monastery with the Church of the Virgin Mary

The core of the historic town centre is the square Mírové náměstí. Adjacent to the square is the Church of Saints Peter and Paul and the castle. In the middle of the square is a Marian column from the 18th century. Gothic, Renaissance and Baroque houses have been preserved in the historic town centre.

The fortifications of the town consisted of walls, four gates and a castle. Three gates and fortification walls in the southern part of the historic centre have been preserved to this day. The Red Gate is listed as the second oldest town gate in Bohemia.

The Horažďovice Castle is among the most valuable buildings in the town. The original Gothic fortress was rebuilt by the House of Švihovský into a Renaissance castle, with the only Gothic remains being cellars carved in the rock and a rotund tower. In 1681–1692, the Sternbergs rebuilt the castle in the Baroque style. From the Renaissance form of the castle, a small inner courtyard with arcades and fresco decoration and a two-story castle tower have been preserved. Since 1920, the castle houses the town museum. The exhibitions focus on the history of the town and on historical activities in the area around the Otava River (gold panning, mining, pearl oysters farming).

The Minorite monastery was founded in 1501. A chapel from 1330 was rebuilt into the Church of the Virgin Mary. The late Gothic monastery complex was rebuilt in the Baroque style in 1685–1709. The church tower was added in 1935. After the monastery was abolished in 1814, the building was bought by the order of Notre Dame Sisters in 1855. For almost 100 years it was the seat of the order for the whole country. After the Velvet Revolution in 1989, the order returned. Currently, a monastery school and a secondary vocational school are located on the premises.

The Church of Saints Peter and Paul belongs to the oldest buildings in the town. The Gothic basilica was gradually built from the third quarter of the 13th century to the first half of the 14th century. Baroque modifications were made in 1729, most likely according to the plans of František Maxmilián Kaňka.

The Church of Saint John the Baptist was built in the Renaissance style in 1598. Early Baroque modifications were made in 1693. It serves as a cemetery church. The church includes a neo-Baroque tomb from 1905.

== Notable people ==
- Rudolf I of Bohemia (c. 1282 – 1307), King of Bohemia and titular King of Poland; died here
- Otakar Ševčík (1852–1934), violinist and violin teacher
- Sigmund Eisner (1859–1925), Austrian-American businessman
- Victor Fürth (1893–1984), architect
- Jaroslav Blahoš (1930–2018), physician
- Milan Nakonečný (born 1932), professor of psychology, historian and writer

== Twin towns – sister cities ==
Horažďovice is twinned with:

- Heimberg, Switzerland

Horažďovice also has friendly relations with Regen in Germany.
