= ICCF Czech Republic =

ICCF Czech Republic is an ICCF national member federations.

== Creation of SKSvCR ==
On January 1, 1993 the Correspondence Chess Association of the Czech Republic (SKSvCR) was founded.

== Achievements ==
In the Sixteenth Olympiad (2010-2016) the Czech team took first place.

In the Fourth Ladies Olympiad (1992-1997) the team received gold medals.

== Titled players ==
=== Grandmaster ===
- Boukal, Petr
- Chytilek, Roman
- Danek, Libor
- Dufek, Jiri
- Husak, Karel
- Hלbl, Jaroslav
- Jaroslav Ježek
- Kratochvil, Milos
- Lounek, Jan
- Moucka, Jiri
- Nyvit, Zdenek
- Pospisil, Ludvik
- Sevecek, Rudolf
- Stalmach, Kamil
- Straka, Zdenek
- Svacek, Pavel
- Tochacek,
- Vaindl, Ing. Jaroslav
- Vosahlik, Jiri
- Vrkoc, David
- Zapletal, Ing. Jindrich
- Židů, Jan

=== Senior International Master ===
- Göth, Jiří
- Lexa, Václav
- Makovský, Petr
- Michálek, Miroslav
- Miškovský, Pavel
- Mráz, Milan
- Mrkvička, Josef
- Pletánek, Jan
- Rybák, Milan
- Sedláček, Oldřich
- Svoboda, František
- Sýkora, Josef
- Teichmann, Čeněk
- Trapl, Jindřich
- Urban, Jaromír
- Žlebčík, Ladislav

=== International Master ===
- Adamus, Karel
- Alexa, Jaroslav
- Buchníček, Petr
- Canibal, Jaromír
- Chmelík, Jiří
- Ježek, Jan
- Kudela, Stanislav
- Laurenc, Petr
- Němec, Jaroslav
- Nun, Josef
- Šmalcl, František
- Smrčka, František
- Šnajdr, Josef
- Spodný, Josef
- Vávra, Jan
- Weiner, Milan

=== Ladies Grandmaster ===
- Bažantová, Marie
- Horáčková, Vlasta
- Možná, Eva
- Rývová, Anna
- Sikorová-Klosová, Alena
- Valinová, Jana
- Zpěváková, Kateřina

=== International Ladies Master ===
- Beranová, Věra
- Ducháčová, Anna
- Kubíková, Hana
- Modrová, Hana
- Nejezchlebová, Vlasta
- Palková, Hana
- Řechková, Miloslava
- Skácelíková-Dernovská, Milena
- Vaindlová, Daniela

International tournaments that are organized by the national federation
