= Yaroslava =

- Gender: female
- Language: Russian, Ukrainian

Origin
- Language: Slavic
- Origin: jar ("strong, fierce") + slav ("glory, fame")
- Region of origin: Eastern Europe

Other names
- Alternative spelling: Ярослава
- Variant form: Jaroslava (Czech / Slovak form)
- Related names: Yaroslav

Yaroslava (Cyrillic: Ярослава) is a Slavic feminine given name. It is the feminine form of Yaroslav, composed of the Slavic elements jar meaning "strong, fierce" and slav meaning "glory, fame".

The Czech and Slovak form of the name is Jaroslava, the Polish form is Jarosława.

Notable people with the name include:

- Yaroslava Bondarenko (born 1997), Russian cyclist
- Yaroslava Frolova (born 1997), Russian handball player
- Yaroslava Mahuchikh (born 2001), Ukrainian high jumper
- Yaroslava Mosiychuk (born 1960), Ukrainian actress
- Yaroslava Muzyka (1894–1973), Ukrainian painter, restorer, and public figure
- Yaroslava Nechaeva, Russian ice dancer
- Yaroslava Pavlovich (born 1969), Belarusian rower
- Yaroslava Plaviuk (1926–2023), Ukrainian activist
- Yaroslava Shvedova (born 1987), Russian-Kazakhstani tennis player
- Yaroslava Stetsko (1920–2003), Ukrainian politician
- Yaroslava Yakushina (born 1993), Russian boxer
