= Miroslav Zálešák =

- Born: January 2, 1980 (age 46) Skalica, Czechoslovakia
- Height: 6 ft 0 in (183 cm)
- Weight: 185 lb (84 kg; 13 st 3 lb)
- Position: Right wing
- Shot: Left
- Played for: HK Nitra; San Jose Sharks; HK 36 Skalica; HC Litvínov; Södertälje SK; HC Oceláři Třinec; HC Košice; Piráti Chomutov; Yertis Pavlodar; ŠHK 37 Piešťany
- National team: Slovakia
- NHL draft: 104th overall, 1998; San Jose Sharks
- Playing career: 2000–2016

Miroslav Zálešák (born January 2, 1980) is a Slovak former professional ice hockey right winger who played in the National Hockey League for the San Jose Sharks. He is currently working as a European scout for the Colorado Avalanche.

== Playing career ==
Zálešák was drafted 104th overall by the San Jose Sharks in the 1998 NHL entry draft. He has played 12 career NHL games, scoring 1 goal and 2 assists for 3 points. His only NHL goal was scored on March 11, 2003 against Brent Johnson and the visiting St. Louis Blues.

After the 2004–05 NHL lockout, Zálešák was not tendered a qualifying offer, as San Jose felt they had no room for him. Wanting to play in the NHL, Zálešák signed a contract with the Washington Capitals. However, Zálešák had a clause in his deal that stated if he ever was sent down to the AHL, he had the option of nullifying the contract. After being sent down, Zálešák exercised his option and returned to Slovakia to sign for his hometown team HK 36 Skalica before moving to HC Litvínov in the Czech Extraliga. In 2005, Zálešák signed with Södertälje SK of the Swedish Elitserien and led the team in goals (16) and points (25). He returned to the Czech Republic with two seasons for HC Oceláři Třinec before returning to HK 36 Skalica.

== International play ==
Zálešák played for Slovakia at the 2006 and 2010 World Championships.

== Career statistics ==
=== Regular season and playoffs ===
			Regular season					Playoffs
Season	Team	League	GP	G	A	Pts	PIM	GP	G	A	Pts	PIM
1995–96	HK Nitra U18	SVK U18	49	53	29	82	—	—	—	—	—	—
1996–97	HK Nitra U18	SVK U18	58	51	31	82	—	—	—	—	—	—
1997–98	HK Nitra U20	SVK U20	27	32	29	61	30	—	—	—	—	—
1997–98	HK Nitra	SVK	30	8	6	14	0	—	—	—	—	—
1998–99	Drummondville Voltigeurs	QMJHL	45	24	27	51	18	—	—	—	—	—
1998–99	HK Nitra	SVK	14	4	2	6	10	—	—	—	—	—
1999–00	Drummondville Voltigeurs	QMJHL	60	50	61	111	40	16	7	11	18	4
2000–01	Kentucky Thoroughblades	AHL	60	14	11	25	26	3	0	1	1	4
2001–02	Cleveland Barons	AHL	74	22	20	42	44	—	—	—	—	—
2002–03	San Jose Sharks	NHL	10	1	2	3	0	—	—	—	—	—
2002–03	Cleveland Barons	AHL	50	27	22	49	35	—	—	—	—	—
2003–04	San Jose Sharks	NHL	2	0	0	0	0	—	—	—	—	—
2003–04	Cleveland Barons	AHL	72	35	40	75	80	9	1	4	5	14
2004–05	HK 36 Skalica	SVK	18	11	14	25	18	—	—	—	—	—
2004–05	HC Chemopetrol Litvínov	CZE	30	6	6	12	26	6	1	1	2	0
2005–06	Södertälje SK	SWE	43	16	9	25	28	—	—	—	—	—
2006–07	HC Oceláři Třinec	CZE	11	2	0	2	6	1	1	0	1	32
2007–08	HC Oceláři Třinec	CZE	25	4	5	9	55	—	—	—	—	—
2007–08	HK 36 Skalica	SVK	21	13	16	29	20	10	3	5	8	31
2008–09	HK 36 Skalica	SVK	38	13	33	46	62	17	2	9	11	16
2009–10	HK 36 Skalica	SVK	47	26	14	40	76	7	2	1	3	6
2010–11	HK 36 Skalica	SVK	52	23	33	56	88	—	—	—	—	—
2010–11	HC Košice	SVK	6	5	3	8	4	14	8	8	16	4
2011–12	HC Košice	SVK	54	15	32	47	36	16	7	5	12	18
2012–13	Piráti Chomutov	CZE	49	9	13	22	57	—	—	—	—	—
2013–14	Yertis Pavlodar	KAZ	46	26	43	69	34	13	2	8	10	8
2014–15	Yertis Pavlodar	KAZ	21	5	15	20	30	—	—	—	—	—
2014–15	HK 36 Skalica	SVK	6	1	0	1	2	—	—	—	—	—
2015–16	Swindon Wildcats	EIHL	7	4	6	10	2	—	—	—	—	—
2015–16	HK 36 Skalica	SVK	21	2	7	9	6	—	—	—	—	—
2015–16	ŠHK 37 Piešťany	SVK	8	1	0	1	6	—	—	—	—	—
SVK totals			315	122	160	282	328	72	23	33	56	79
NHL totals			12	1	2	3	0	—	—	—	—	—

=== International ===
Medal record

Representing Slovakia

Men's ice hockey

World Junior Championships
Bronze medal – third place	1999 Canada	

Year	Team	Event	GP	G	A	Pts	PIM
1998	Slovakia	EJC	6	4	1	5	2
1999	Slovakia	WJC	5	2	1	3	4
2000	Slovakia	WJC	7	1	2	3	2
2006	Slovakia	WC	7	0	1	1	2
2010	Slovakia	WC	3	0	0	0	0
Junior totals			18	7	4	11	8
Senior totals			10	0	1	1	2
