= René Školiak =

Slovak ice hockey player

- Born: 28 January 1979 (age 47) Liptovský Mikuláš, Czechoslovakia
- Height: 6 ft 0 in (183 cm)
- Weight: 187 lb (85 kg; 13 st 5 lb)
- Position: Centre
- Shot: Left
- Played for: HK 32 Liptovsky Mikulas; HC Slovan Bratislava; HK Dubnica; HK 36 Skalica; HC Slavia Praha; HK Nitra; SHK 37 Piestany
- Playing career: 1996–2016

René Školiak (born 28 January 1979) is a Slovak professional ice hockey centre who played with HC Slovan Bratislava in the Slovak Extraliga.

== Career statistics ==
			Regular season					Playoffs
Season	Team	League	GP	G	A	Pts	PIM	GP	G	A	Pts	PIM
1996–97	HK 32 Liptovsky Mikulas	Slovak	5	1	1	2	0	—	—	—	—	—
1997–98	HK 32 Liptovsky Mikulas	Slovak	14	0	3	3	6	—	—	—	—	—
1998–99	HK 32 Liptovsky Mikulas	Slovak	25	7	7	14	6	—	—	—	—	—
1999–00	HK 32 Liptovsky Mikulas	Slovak	53	5	5	10	14	—	—	—	—	—
2000–01	HK 32 Liptovsky Mikulas	Slovak	52	14	19	33	54	—	—	—	—	—
2001–02	HK 32 Liptovsky Mikulas	Slovak	53	11	21	32	16	—	—	—	—	—
2002–03	HK 32 Liptovsky Mikulas	Slovak	47	14	20	34	38	—	—	—	—	—
2002–03	HC Slovan Bratislava	Slovak	7	0	2	2	10	—	—	—	—	—
2003–04	HK 32 Liptovsky Mikulas	Slovak	20	2	6	8	16	—	—	—	—	—
2003–04	HC Slovan Bratislava	Slovak	29	4	6	10	37	—	—	—	—	—
2004–05	HK Dubnica	Slovak	10	4	2	6	34	—	—	—	—	—
2004–05	HC Slovan Bratislava	Slovak	29	4	6	10	37	—	—	—	—	—
2005–06	HK 36 Skalica	Slovak	33	4	14	18	53	—	—	—	—	—
2005–06	HC Slovan Bratislava	Slovak	20	4	9	13	30	4	0	0	0	4
2006–07	HK 36 Skalica	Slovak	53	20	50	70	97	5	1	0	1	2
2007–08	HK 36 Skalica	Slovak	53	19	26	45	94	13	3	9	12	36
2008–09	HK 36 Skalica	Slovak	38	9	16	25	66	17	1	8	9	16
2009–10	HK 36 Skalica	Slovak	46	8	21	29	66	7	2	7	9	8
2010–11	HK 36 Skalica	Slovak	47	18	33	51	113	6	0	0	0	12
2011–12	HK 36 Skalica	Slovak	54	20	42	62	114	6	3	2	5	6
2012–13	HK 36 Skalica	Slovak	54	15	48	63	92	7	6	4	10	10
2013–14	HK 36 Skalica	Slovak	56	16	36	52	90	6	0	0	0	4
2013–14	HK 32 Liptovsky Mikulas	Slovak2	—	—	—	—	—	2	2	3	5	2
2014–15	HK 36 Skalica	Slovak	38	4	32	36	44	—	—	—	—	—
2014–15	HC Slavia Praha	Czech	8	1	2	3	8	—	—	—	—	—
2014–15	HK Nitra	Slovak	7	2	5	7	16	12	2	6	8	8
2015–16	HK 36 Skalica	Slovak	41	6	11	17	38	—	—	—	—	—
2015–16	SHK 37 Piestany	Slovak	11	1	4	5	6	—	—	—	—	—
Slovak totals			895	212	445	657	1,187	83	18	36	54	106
