= Jaroslav Borák =

Czech footballer

Personal information
- Date of birth: 9 November 1989 (age 36)
- Place of birth: Brno, Czechoslovakia
- Height: 1.81 m (5 ft 11 in)
- Position: Midfielder

Youth career
- 1993–1999: FC Dosta Bystrc-Kníničky
- 1999–2007: 1. FC Brno

Senior career*
Years	Team	Apps	(Gls)
2008–2012	1. FC Brno	13	(0)
2009	→ Vlašim (loan)	13	(1)
2010	→ Zlín (loan)	13	(1)
- * Club domestic league appearances and goals

Jaroslav Borák (born 9 November 1989) is a Czech former football player.

He started his football career with FC Dosta Bystrc-Kníničky, but has been playing for 1. FC Brno since the age of eight. He joined the first team in January 2008.
