= Jaroslav Marx =

Czech footballer

Personal information
- Date of birth: 20 July 1971 (age 54)
- Place of birth: Czechoslovakia
- Position: Midfielder

Senior career*
Years	Team	Apps	(Gls)
1992–1993	1. SC Znojmo		
1993–1995	FK Baník Havířov		(1)
1995–1998	Uherské Hradiště	66	(1)
1998–1999	SK Tatran Poštorná	24	(0)
1999	KFC Uerdingen 05	2	(0)
2000	Bonner SC		
2000–2001	SK Tatran Poštorná		(3)
2001–2002	FK Fotbal Třinec		(2)
2002–2003	Birkirkara	23	(0)
2003–2004	Balzan Youths		
2004–2005	Valletta		
- * Club domestic league appearances and goals

Jaroslav Marx (born 20 July 1971) is a Czech former professional footballer who played as a midfielder.

== Career ==
Marx was born in Czechoslovakia. He started his career in the Czech Republic, where he played for SK Tatran Poštorná among other teams. He later played in Germany before returning to the Czech Republic, playing in the third-tier Moravian-Silesian Football League.

=== Malta ===
In 2002 Marx was signed by Birkirkara, and was eligible to take part in the UEFA Cup. Although he was almost not offered a new contract that winter, he performed well in a game against Mosta F.C., helping Birkirkara win 2–0, and the board changed their mind about terminating his contract until June 2003.

In 2005, he flew to the Czech Republic so that he could receive injury treatment while on the books of Valletta.
