= Jaroslav Kraft =

Czech paleontologist (1940–2007)

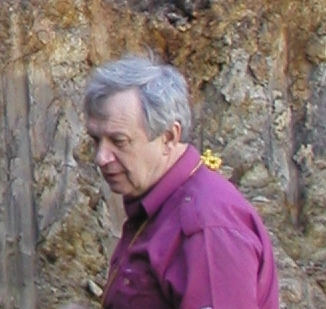
- Born: April 9, 1940
- Died: January 10, 2007 (aged 66)
- Education: Charles University, Prague
- Scientific career
- Fields: Paleontology

Jaroslav Kraft, CSc. (April 9, 1940 – January 10, 2007) was an internationally recognised Czech palaeontologist and a prominent specialist in Ordovician dendroid graptolites.

== Early life ==
Kraft was the son of Jan Kraft, a bookbinder and enthusiastic fossil collector. He completed his education at Charles University, Prague.

== Career ==
Kraft became a geologistat the Geologický průzkum Praha enterprise ("Geological exploration"), branch Stříbro, following an administrative allocation. From 1965 to 1974, he worked as a research assistant in the Museum of Western Bohemia (Západočeské muzeum).

From 1974 to 1980, he worked for the N. P. Geindustria Praha company as a geologist. From 1980 to 1981, he worked in the section of Collections at the Central Geological Institute (now Czech Geological Survey). From 1982 to 1988, he worked as geologist and palaeontologist in the county branch of the State Institution for Cultural Heritage and Nature Conservation in Plzeň.

In the Dr. Bohuslav Horák Museum, Rokycany, he worked as an external specialist from 1963 to 1988, and from 1988 to 1994 as an internal curator. Kraft held Dr. B. Horák in high esteem, a situation that motivated his activities. Kraft completed his RNDr. degree in 1973 and after prolonged delays due to political reasons he attained a CSc. degree in 1984. Kraft was appointed assistant professor at the University of Western Bohemia in Plzeň in 1998, though he had been an external assistant there since 1994.

Kraft changed employment numerous times. This was primarily because the communist regime considered Kraft to be politically unreliable, as he actively practiced Protestantism. Though he experienced harsh treatment by the political and state administration, he achieved numerous highlights and professional success. He published numerous papers. Kraft significantly contributed to improving the professional standards of the Dr. B. Horák Museum in Rokycany. His major contribution was in meticulous, curatorial documentation and processing of palaeontological collections, including computer documentation, that made the finds of the local museum one of the most important collections of Ordovician fossils worldwide.

After many years of working in the Rokycany museum, Kraft had to resign from his post as curator. He returned to collections of the Museum of Western Bohemia in Plzeň, continuing his activities as a curator and paleontologist.

Kraft's son, Petr, became a competent collaborator. Together, they co-authored dozens of publications in Czech and international journals. Jo inly with other colleagues, they completed a large project on the Ordovician in Bohemia as an international standard for the Mediterranean region. In 1999, they, with colleagues from Prague, organised the ninth International Symposium on Ordovician System in Prague. Kraft dedicated much of his energy to establishing protection status for important palaeontological and geological sites in Plzeň and Rokycany.

== Publications ==
Kraft published more than one hundred professional papers. The following brief list is but a sampling of papers from later period:

- Kraft J. (1975): Dendroid graptolites of the Ordovician of Bohemia. Sbor. Nár. Muz. (Praha), Ř. B 31, 211–238.
- Kraft J., Kraft P. (1993): The Arenig/Llanvirn boundary (Ordovician) in the Prague Basin (Bohemia). J. Czech Geol. Soc. 38, 3/4, 189–192.
- Kraft J., Kraft P. (1994): The Azygograptus ellesi – Tetragraptus (reclinatus group) Biozone (Klabava Formation, Ordovician of the Prague Basin). Folia Mus. Rer. Natur. Bohem. Occident., Geol. 40, 1–36.
- Kraft J., Kraft P., Seidl R. (1993): New dendroid graptolites from the Lower Ordovician of Bohemia. J. Czech Geol. Soc. 38, 1–2, 89–94.
- Kraft, J., Kraft, P. (2000): Das untere Ordovicium bei Rokycany, Tschechische Republik – In: Pinna, G. – Meischner, D (eds.): Europäische Fossillagerstätten. – EPA, Springer, Berlin, Heidelberg, New York, 24–27, 243, obr. 4–9.
- Kraft, P., Kraft, J., Prokop, R. J. (2001): A possible hydroid from the Lower and Middle Ordovician of Bohemia. – Alcheringa, 25: 143–154.
- Kraft, P., Kraft, J. (2003): Middle Ordovician graptolite fauna from Praha – Cervený vrch (Prague Basin, Czech Republic. – Bulletin of Geosciences, 78(2): 129–139.
- Kraft, P., Kraft, J. (2003): Facies of the Klabava Formation (?Tremadoc – Arenig) and their fossil content (Barrandian area, Czech Republic). – In: Albanesi, G. L., Beresi, M. S., Peralta, S. H. (eds.): Ordovician from the Andes. – INSUGEO, Serie Correlación Geológica, 17: 309–314.
- Kraft, P., Kraft, J., Marek, J., Seidl, R. (2001): Graptolitová fauna zóny Didymograptus clavulus (šárecké souvrství) ordoviku pražské pánve. – Zprávy o geologických výzkumech v roce 2000, Ces. geol. Úst.: 32–35.
