= Jaroslav Jabrocký =

Slovak ice hockey player

- Born: April 16, 1980 (age 46) Poprad, Czechoslovakia
- Height: 5 ft 9 in (175 cm)
- Weight: 181 lb (82 kg; 12 st 13 lb)
- Position: Forward
- Shot: Left
- Slovak Extraliga team: MHC Martin
- Playing career: 2000–2015

Jaroslav Jabrocký (born April 16, 1980) is a retired Slovak professional ice hockey player in Slovakia with MHC Martin of the Slovak Extraliga.
