= Jaroslava Slavíčková =

Czech swimmer

Personal information
- Born: 9 December 1953 (age 72) Prague, Czechoslovakia

Sport
- Sport: Swimming

Jaroslava Slavíčková (born 9 December 1953) is a Czech former swimmer. She competed in three events at the 1972 Summer Olympics.
