= Jaroslav Lyčka =

Czech ice hockey player

- Born: October 7, 1951 (age 73); Ostrava, CS
- Height: 5 ft 11 in (180 cm)
- Weight: 176 lb (80 kg; 12 st 8 lb)
- Position: Defence
- Played for: Dukla Jihlava; Dundee Rockets; HC Vitkovice; Lee Valley Lions; Romford Raiders
- Playing career: unknown–1989

Jaroslav Lyčka (born October 7, 1951, in Ostrava, Czechoslovakia) is a Czech former professional ice hockey player. Having started as a footballer with Dukla Prague, Lyčka switched to ice hockey. He made eight appearances for the Czechoslovakia all-stars (guest team in the North American World Hockey Association) and scored in the final of the Spengler Cup against HC Spartak Moscow, helping HC Dukla Jihlava to the title. Having moved to the UK, he was a popular defenceman for the Dundee Rockets and Lee Valley Lions.

== Sources ==
- Biographical information and career statistics from Eliteprospects.com, or The Internet Hockey Database
- Lee Valley Lions nostalgia page
