= Jaroslav Blahoš =

Czech endocrinologist and osteologist

Prof. MUDr. Jaroslav Blahoš DrSc.
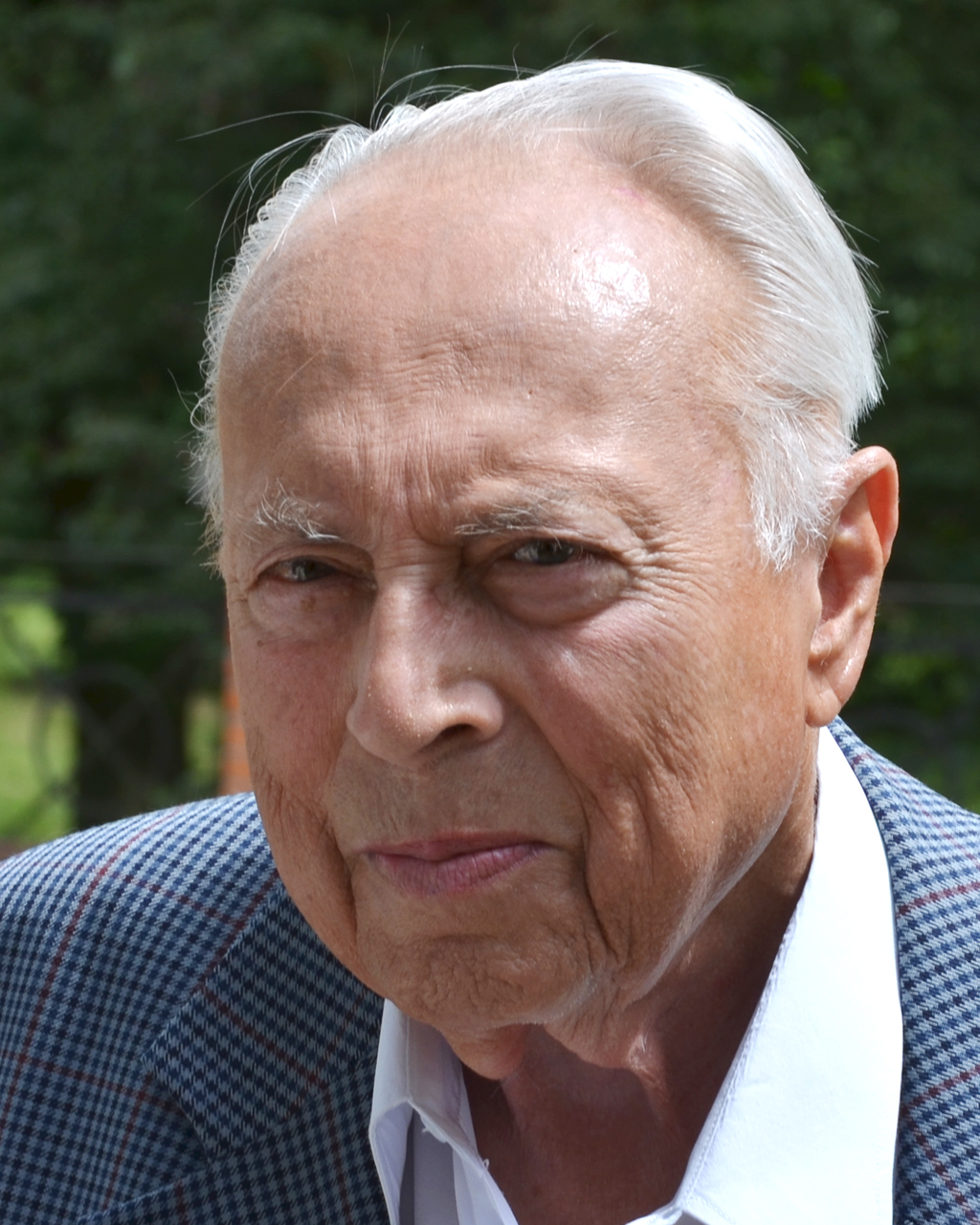
- Born: 30 June 1930; Horažďovice, Czechoslovakia
- Died: 27 November 2018 (aged 88); Prague, Czech Republic
- Occupation: Endocrinologist
- Years active: 1955–2001
- Awards: Medal for Merit 1st Class (2001); Knight of the Czech Medical Association (2007)

Jaroslav Blahoš (30 June 1930 – 27 November 2018) was a Czech endocrinologist and osteologist, specializing in bone and joint issues and the metabolism of uric acid. From September 1990 to January 2015, he served as the chairman of the Czech Medical Society of Jan Evangelista Purkyně, subsequently becoming its honorary chairman. From 1999 to 2001, he was the president of the World Medical Association.

== Biography ==
Jaroslav Blahoš was born on 30 June 1930, in Horažďovice. His family was of Greece origin. His father was a lawyer who, after February 1948, was not allowed to practice law. He had a younger sister, Marcela, who emigrated to Austria in 1965.

He studied at a gymnasium in Strakonice. He then pursued general medicine at the Faculty of Medicine in Charles University in Plzeň, graduating with honors in 1955.

With his first wife, Aranka Blahošová, he had a son, Jaroslav Blahoš (Junior), who specialized in neuroscience. After their divorce, he married in 1970 to an Italian, Simonetta, with whom he had a son, Daniel Blahoš.

He died on 27 November 2018 in Prague.

== Scientific and medical career ==
From 1955 to 1956, Blahoš worked as a physician in Františkovy Lázně. During his university years, he collaborated on research in the field of rheumatology. From 1958 to 1968, he worked at the Research Institute for Endocrinology in Prague. In 1968 and 1969, he worked at the Beaujon Hospital in Paris in the endocrinology clinic. He also spent two years (1961–1963) in Harar, Ethiopia, and from 1977 to 1988, he had shorter study stays in other places, including Tokyo, Leeds, and Padua. He briefly worked as a medical consultant for the airline company Air France.

From 1969, he worked at the internal clinic of the Faculty of Pediatric Medicine, Charles University in the faculty hospital, Hospital of the Merciful Brothers of St. Charles Borromeo until the dissolution of the faculty hospital in 1993. He held various positions there, including as a professor, and from 1989 as the head of the clinic. From 1993 to 1997, he was the head of the internal clinic at the Military Medical Academy of JEP in the Central Military Hospital in Prague, where he founded the first osteocenter in the Czech Republic, which he led from 1997.

He published about 380 scientific papers and 10 monographs, including textbooks on endocrinology, autobiographical works like Medicine's Message in the Labyrinth of the World (Galen 2008, 480 pages) and Bits from a Doctor's Bag (Triton 2014, 247 pages).

== Professional organizations ==
He was a corresponding member of the French National Academy of Medicine (Académie Nationale de Médecine). He also founded the Association of Czech and Slovak Francophone Physicians at the Czech Medical Society of JEP.

From 1990 to 2015, he was the chairman of the Czech Medical Association of Jan Evangelista Purkyně. He was repeatedly elected to this position.

In October 1998, he was elected president of the World Medical Association (World Medical Association) in Ottawa, an organization representing over eight million physicians worldwide, for the term 1999–2001. His opponent was Sir Alexander MacAra, chairman of the British Medical Association. He assumed the position of the 51st president in Tel Aviv on 15 October 1999.

From 2005 onwards, he was a member of the Learned Society of the Czech Republic.

== Awards ==
On 28 October 2001, President Václav Havel awarded him the state decoration for merit, 1st class. In July 2002, French President Jacques Chirac awarded him a Knight of the Order of the Legion of Honour. He also received the Gold Medal of Charles University, the University of Comenius in Bratislava, the J. E. Purkyně Award, the J. M. and Z. Hlávek Medal, and others. In 2007, he was knighted as a Knight of the Czech Medical Association. President Sarkozy also elevated him to the Officer of the Order of the Legion of Honour in 2008.

He was an honorary citizen of Horažďovice (2001), Miami, and Manila.
