= Jaroslav Dvořák (politician) =

Czech politician (born 1957)

Member of the Chamber of Deputies
- In office 21 October 2017 – 8 October 2025

Personal details
- Born: 4 November 1959 (age 67) Czech Republic
- Party: TOP 09 (before 2010); SPD (2017–)

Jaroslav Dvořák (born 1957) is a Czech politician and former neurologist.

== Biography ==
Dvořák worked as a doctor and a neurologist and cited health concerns as a reason for becoming interested in politics. He first joined the TOP 09 party and unsuccessfully ran for Valašské Meziříčí City Council in 2010 but was not elected. He later joined the SPD party. He had been a member of the Chamber of Deputies for the SPD from 2017 to 2025 and a member of Zlín Region Council since 2016.
