= Jaroslav Otruba =

Czech architect, urban planner, designer and artist (1916–2007)

Ing.arch.Dr Jaroslav Otruba
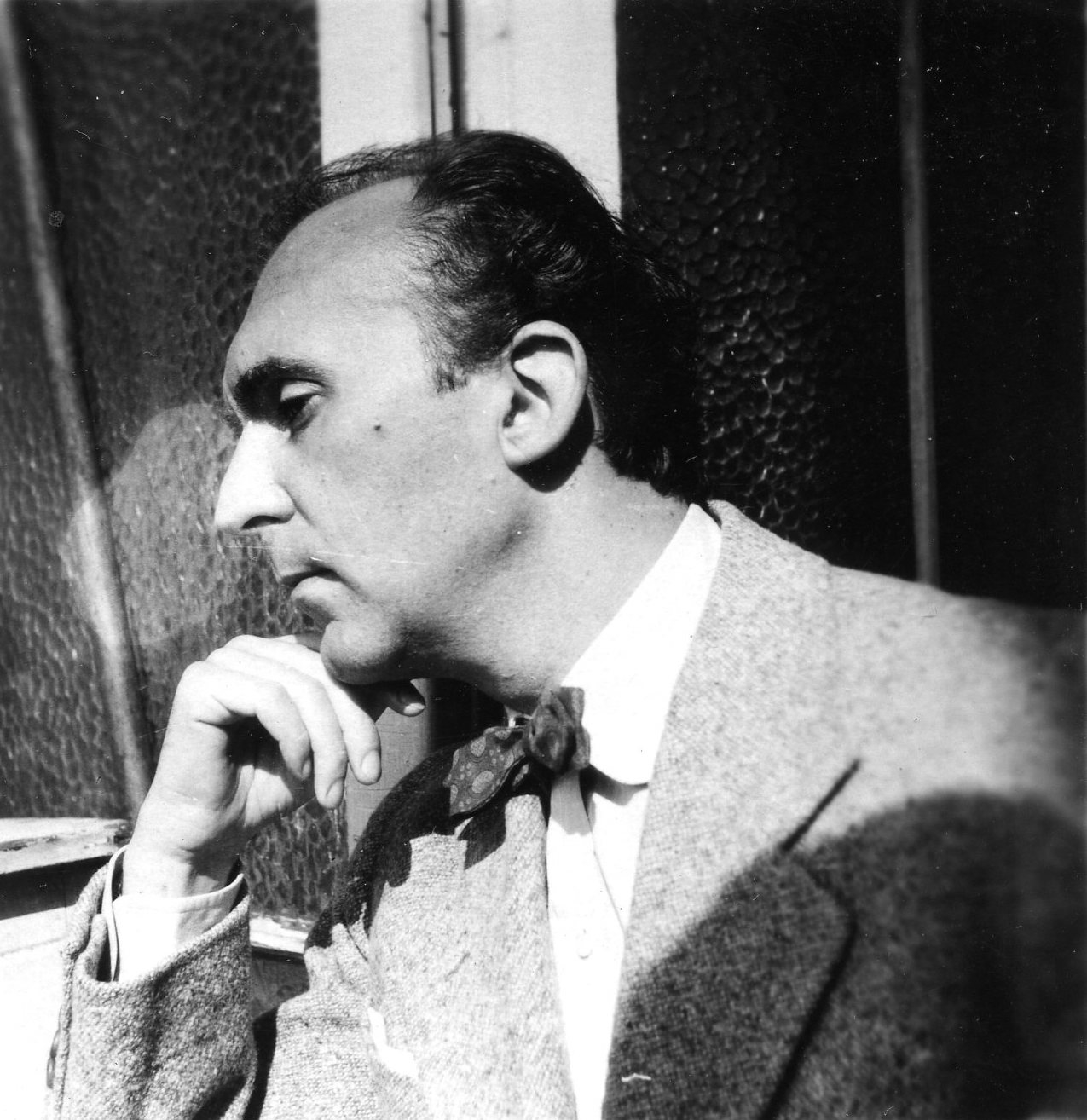
- Jaroslav Otruba
- Born: 11 November 1916; Olomouc, Austria-Hungary
- Died: 5 February 2007 (aged 90); Prague, Czech Republic
- Occupation: Architect
- Spouse: Naděje Uherková
- Children: Vítězslava
- Awards: 1957 International architectural competition for OSN in Geneva, Switzerland – fifth place 1961 Architectural competition for Karlovarské Vřídlo, Karlovy Vary – first place 1973 Prague City Award for architectural design of Prague Metro line "C"
- Buildings: Health Spa Resort in Karlovy Vary; Prostějov Railroad station, 1952; Administrative Building SUDOP, Prague 1974; Karlovarské Vřídlo, Karlovy Vary 1975
- Projects: Line A and Line C (Prague Metro); Prague, Czech Republic
- Design: Aluminum tiles for Prague Metro line "A" 1976

Ing. arch. Dr. Jaroslav Otruba (11 November 1916 – 5 February 2007) was a Czech architect, urban planner, designer and artist.

Jaroslav Otruba was born in Olomouc, Morava, then part of the Austro-Hungarian Empire. He was the son of a cabinetmaker. His life spanned several turbulent periods of Czech Republic's history: World War I before the dissolution of the Austro-Hungarian Empire in 1918; under Nazi occupation from 1939 until the end of World War II in 1945; and under the rule of the communist Soviet Republic from 1948 to 1989.

Jaroslav Otruba's most prolific work, particularly in architecture, was produced during the latter part of the 20th century. He contributed to the urban design and planning of Prague and the rest of Czech Republic. He is best known for his contributions to the creation, design, and development of the Prague Metro system.

Jaroslav Otruba was both an architect and urban planner. One of his more visited contributions are the colorful aluminum tiles found in Line A of the Prague Metro. The artistic style of the tiles draws on the op-art movement of the 1960s and it is considered a Prague tourist attraction.

== Education ==
After graduating from technical school, he began studying at the University of Architecture and Civil Engineering in Prague. His mentors included Antonín Mendl, under whom Jaroslav Otruba studied Architecture; Alois Mikuškovic, under whom he studied Town Planning and Landscaping; and Oldřich Blažíček, who directed his courses on Drawing and Painting. The Nazis closed all universities in 1939, delaying Otruba's graduation until June 1945, which he then completed with Honors. The Ministry of Education later back-dated his graduation to 1940.

During the closure of Czech universities Jaroslav Otruba joined the studio-office of F. Stalmach and J. Svoboda as an architect.

In August 1945, the University of Architecture and Civil Engineering hired Jaroslav Otruba as an assistant professor, participating in a vast study of surgical hospital departments for his dissertation. During this period, he helped create the Department of Medical Architecture at the University. In 1953, he received his Doctorate in Architecture. From 1956 to 1959 he completed a second dissertation on maternity wards.

== Career and legacy ==
Jaroslav Otruba's works consisted mainly of transportation buildings: the main building for a railroad station and two apartment buildings for railroad employees in Prostějov in 1947 (completed in 1952), followed by a railroad station in Řečkovice near Brno (completed in 1952). He also completed a project in Přibyslav, a complex of three railroad stations at the line Havlíčkův Brod – Brno (completed in 1949).

In the 1960s and 1970s he created a complex of engineering and industrial buildings in Prague-Vršovice (completed in 1967), an administrative building in Prague, Kubánské náměstí (completed in 1966), a building for the administration of railroads in Prague at Vinohradská Boulevard (completed in 1974), and an administrative building for the Ministry of Transportation in Prague Žižkov at Olšanká Street (completed in 1974).

Otruba designed a thermal colonnade in Karlovy Vary in 1961, as part of a larger urban design for the spa town. The colonnade was never completed.

Jiri Siegel, an architect and engineer who was one of Otruba's many students, wrote: "[Otruba] was respected for his positive attitude, professional assurance, success and maximum tact" while working with his students. As a result of the pressure for political (read: Communist) conformity among the faculty of the University, Otruba resigned his teaching post in 1960. He subsequently took a job at the State Department of Transportation, spending ten years as a lead designer within the department.

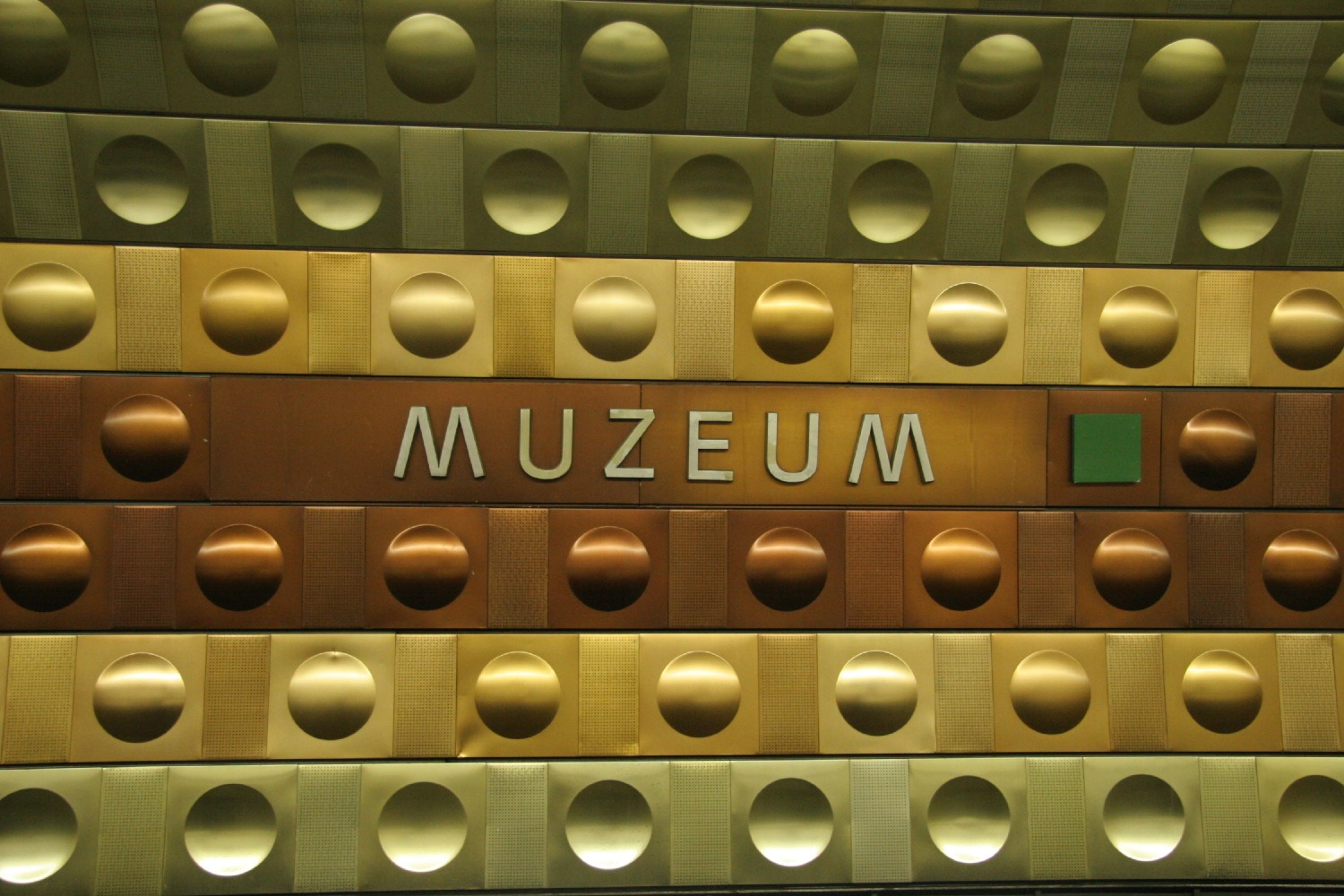
Prague Metro

In 1979 Jaroslav Otruba was transferred to Metroproject, a new department tasked with building the massive Prague public transportation system. As lead architect and designer, he oversaw the creation of the A and C lines of the Prague Metro. Jaroslav Otruba is the designer of the distinctive aluminum tiles that can be found throughout the Metro A line.

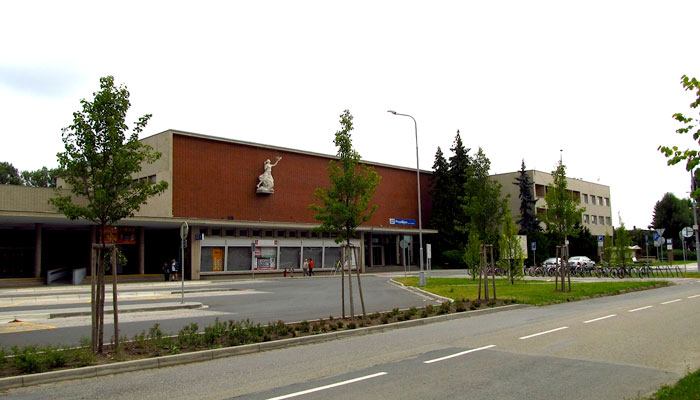
Prostějov Railroad Station front view

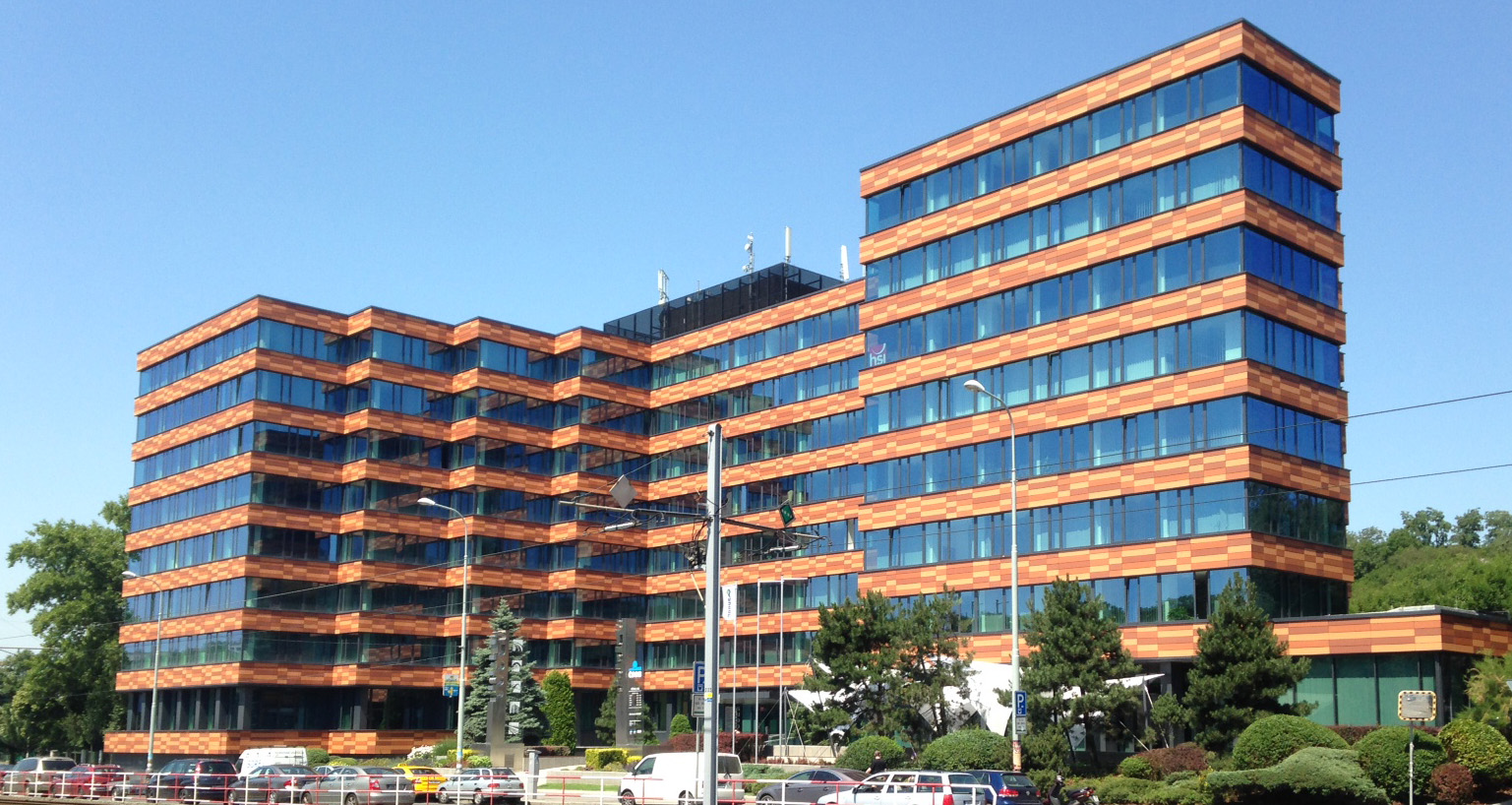
SUDOP Administrative Building, Prague-Vršovice

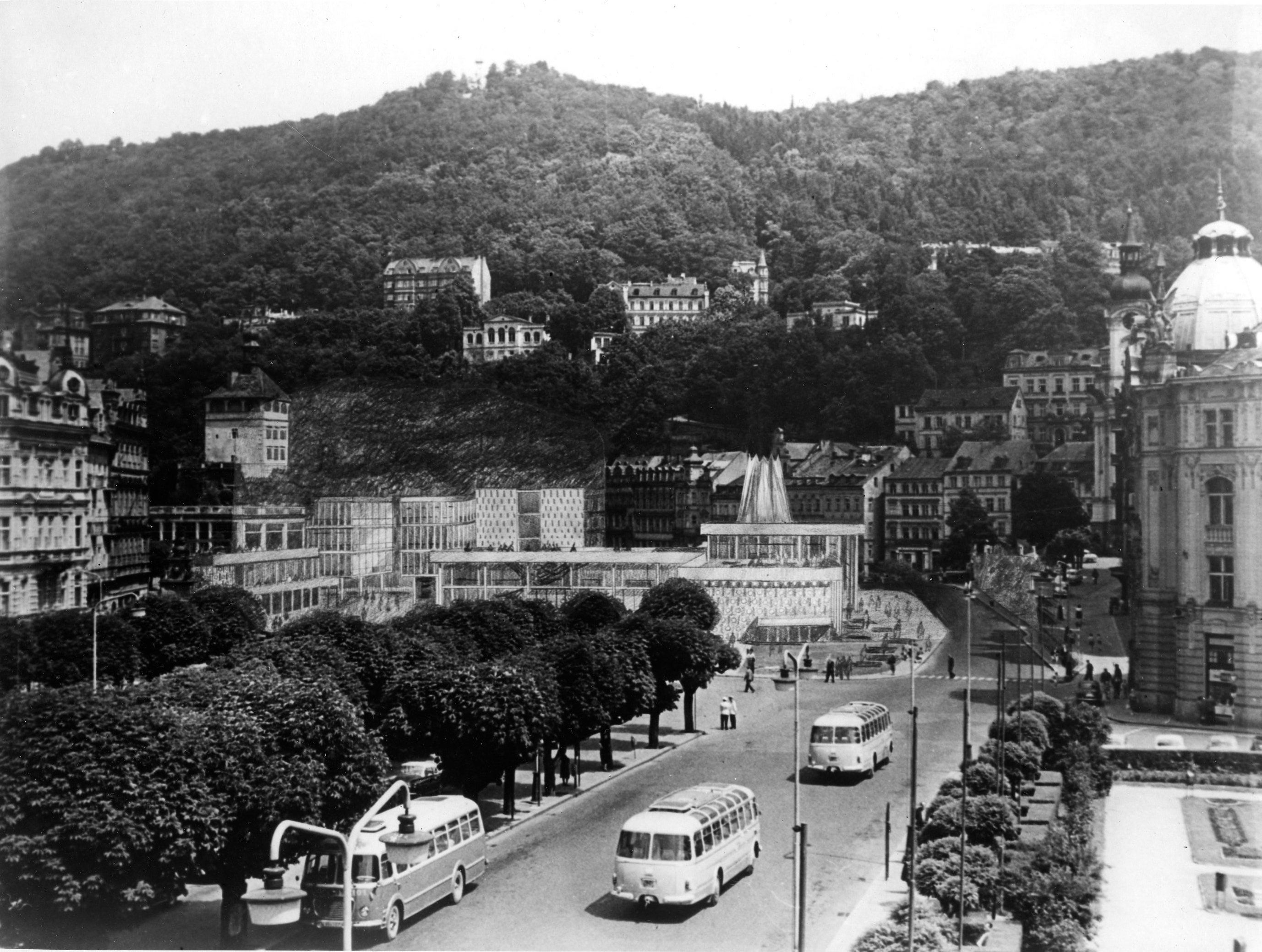
Winning project Vřídelní Kolonáda Karlovy Vary health spa resort and urban landscaping 1961

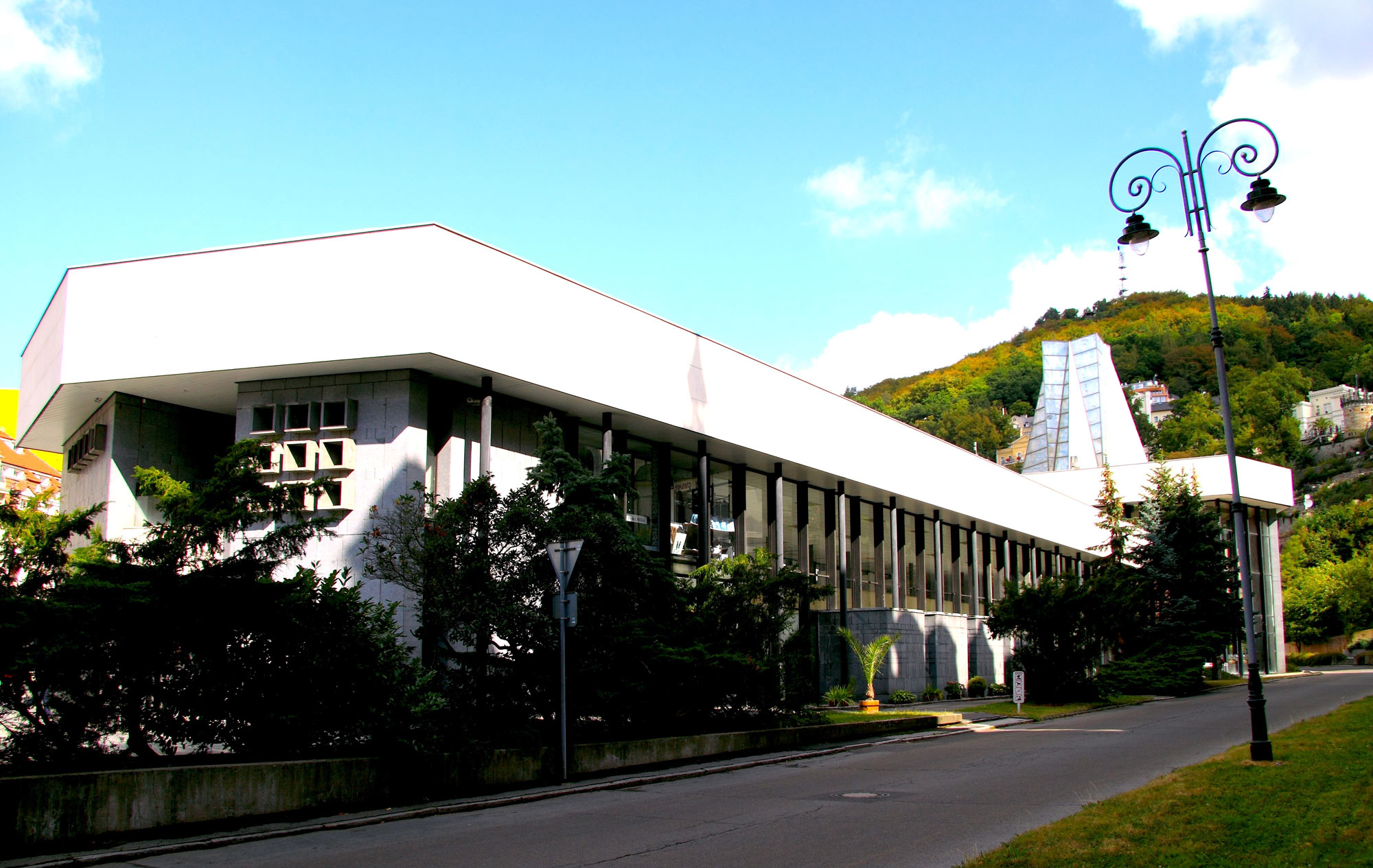
Vřídelní Kolonáda Karlovy Vary health spa resort 1975

== Competitions ==
Jaroslav Otruba participated in many national and international architectural competitions. Among the more prestigious national competitions were the competition for the State Theater and Opera in Brno 1956, (third place in the open competition and second place in an invitation-only competition), in 1960 a competition for the town plan design for a spa center in Karlovy Vary (first place in an exclusive competition), in 1966 a competition for a town plan for the spa area in Františkovy Lázně (first place). In 1970 he collaborated with architect Šrámek in an architectural competition for the design of the dispatcher building at the Main Railroad Station in Prague (first place).

Otrubova participated in several international competitions, placing fifth in an architectural competition for the design of the Plaza for UN in Geneva in 1957. In 1958 he participated in an international architectural competition for the design of the town hall in Toronto, Canada and a memorial to victims in former Nazi German Auschwitz concentration camp in occupied Poland (now Auschwitz-Birkenau State Museum, Oświęcim). In 1962 he collaborated with architect Jindřich Krise in a competition for the design of the main railroad station in Sofia, Bulgaria and in 1965 in the EUROKURSAL competition in San Sebestian, Spain.

For his basic concept for stations of the Prague Metro line C in 1974 Jaroslav Otruba was presented with 1973‘s Prague City Award.

=== Timeline of Awards and Competitions ===
| Year | Project |
|---|---|
| 1940 | Competition for design of renovation of Charles Square, Prague (collaboration with Ing.arch.VC. Ivan Vacek) – 2nd place |
| 1945 | Competition for apartment house in Záluží u Mostu (Litvínov) (collaboration with Ing.arch. B. Bubla) – 2nd place |
| 1946 | Design of hotel in Záluží u Mostu |
| 1946 | Design for Community Center in Záluží u Mostu |
| 1947 | Competition for town hall in Košice – honorable mention award |
| 1947 | Design of memorial for victims of occupation of Březnice (sculpture by O.Kozák). Memorial erected 1947 |
| 1947 | Design for railroad station and hotel in Prostějov. Construction completed 1952 |
| 1947 | Design for two apartment houses for railroad employees in Prostějov. Construction completed 1952 |
| 1947 | Design of Department of National health in Březnice (collaboration with Ing.arch. V. Šedivý and Ing.arch. J.Krásný) |
| 1948 | Competition for Dukla memorial (collaboration with sculptor O.Kozák) – honorable mention award |
| 1948 | Competition for memorial of Kaunicových Dormitories in Brno (collaboration with sculptor O.Kozák) – honorable mention award |
| 1948 | Design of dispatcher building for railroad station in Řečkovice u Brna. Construction completed 1952 |
| 1949 | Design of dispatcher building for railroad station in Tišnov, near Brno |
| 1949 | Design of three dispatcher buildings between Havlíčkuv Brod. Brno Construction completed in Přibyslav |
| 1949 | Design of dispatcher building and landscape design in Ostrava. Partial completion 1950-1952 |
| 1949 | Architectural competition for National Opera and Ballet Theater in Brno – 3rd place in general competition |
| 1949 | Architectural competition for National Ballet Theater in Brno – 2nd place in finalist competition |
| 1956 | International competition for UNESCO Plaza in Geneva – 5th place |
| 1956 | Architectural competition for Physical Education Center (ČKD) in Prague 8 (collaboration with Prof. Ing, arch. F. Čermák and Ing.arch J.Paroubek) – 2nd place in final competition |
| 1957 | Architectural competition for the University of Agriculture in Prague, Suchdol-Lysolaje – honorable mention |
| 1957 | International architectural competition for Toronto City Hall, Ontario, Canada |
| 1957 | International architectural competition for war memorial in Auschwitz concentration camp (collaboration with Naděje Otrubová) |
| 1959 | Architectural competition for Metropolitan Children's Faculty Hospital in Motol, Prague (collaboration with Naděje Otrubová) – honorable mention |
| 1959 | Architectural competition for the complex and urban landscaping design for health spa resort in Karlovy Vary - 2nd place (highest award). Construction of thermal spring colonnade completed in 1975 |
| 1961 | Architectural competition for the complex and urban landscaping design for health spa resort in Karlovy Vary (selected architects only) – 1st place |
| 1962 | International architectural competition for the complex and urban landscaping design for the main railroad station in Sofia, Bulgaria (urban design by Prof.Dr.Ing.arch. J.Krise) |
| 1965 | International architectural competition for Eurokursal in San Sebastian, Spain |
| 1965 | Design for Engineering and Industrial complex in Prague, Vršovice - Construction completed 1967 |
| 1965 | Architectural competition for the complex and urban landscaping design for health spa resort in Františkovy Lázně – 1st place |
| 1965 | Architectural competition for the complex and urban landscaping design for city center and main railroad station in Prague – 3rd place |
| 1968 | Design for headquarters for Ministry of Highways in Prague, Vinohradská. Construction completed 1974 |
| 1968 | Design for Headquarters of Ministry of Transportation (SUDOP) in Žižkov, Prague. Construction completed in 1974 |
| 1968 | First architectural study and concept design for Prague Metro |
| 1970 | Selective architectural competition for design of Central Railroad station in Prague. Joint recipient of 1st prize with Ing. arch. J.Šrámek |
| 1970 – 1974 | Leading architect with Metroprojekt, Design and completion of line "C" of Prague Metro |
| 1970 – 1974 | Award of excellence of the National Council of the capital city of Prague for the year 1973 |
| 1972 – 1976 | Leading architect with Metroprojekt Design and completion of line "A" of Prague Metro |
| 1982 | Patent and copyright for attachment of aluminum tiles in Prague Metro line "A" approved |

== The Artist ==
Jaroslav Otruba's second profession as an artist. His painting evolved in different styles, influenced by the heavy political pressure of the early 1950s. At the beginning of his painting career he used oil paints on canvas, but later discovered synthetic acrylic paints which he applied to paper. Otruba's early paintings reflect abstract configurations of communication: antennas and various objects from outer space. As he became further immersed in the world of architecture, Otruba's paintings often portrayed architectural objects, such as Gothic cathedrals and imaginary abstract cities. After a trip to the United States, his paintings consisted of countless variations on skyscrapers and cities full of color, often in congruence with his earlier European cities and historical styles.

In the 1990s he experimented with abstract painting, concentrating on lines and colors, movement of lines and circles, sometimes interpreting a city within a dramatic storm. In 2000 he started to paint different cities and small towns from old maps. In 2001 an illness prevented him from continuing his passion for painting.

Jaroslav Otruba did not pursue exhibition or compensation for his paintings. He had one art exhibition at Most Hospital in 1983. His paintings are held in private collections in Europe, the United States, and Australia. After his death in 2007, his wife sold one of his paintings in an art auction at Prague Gallery Kodl in 2009
