= Jaroslav Koma =

Slovak ice hockey player

- Born: January 19, 1985 (age 41) Prešov, Czechoslovakia
- Height: 5 ft 9 in (175 cm)
- Weight: 190 lb (86 kg; 13 st 8 lb)
- Position: Defence
- Shot: Right
- Played for: HC Pardubice; HC Litvínov; HC Kometa Brno; BK Mladá Boleslav; HC Vítkovice; HK Dukla Trenčín; HC Slavia Praha; HC '05 Banská Bystrica
- Playing career: 2004–2019

Jaroslav Koma (born 19 January 1985) is a Slovak former professional ice hockey defenceman.

Koma played in the Czech Extraliga for HC Pardubice, HC Litvínov, HC Kometa Brno, BK Mladá Boleslav, HC Vítkovice and HC Slavia Praha. He also played in the Tipsport Liga for HK Dukla Trenčín and HC '05 Banská Bystrica.

== Career statistics ==
			Regular season					Playoffs
Season	Team	League	GP	G	A	Pts	PIM	GP	G	A	Pts	PIM
2003–04	HC Presov U20	Slovak U20	46	6	13	19	75	—	—	—	—	—
2003–04	PHK Prešov	Slovak2	7	0	3	3	0	4	0	0	0	2
2004–05	HC Presov U20	Slovak U20	37	7	14	21	32	—	—	—	—	—
2004–05	PHK Prešov	Slovak2	27	1	2	3	4	6	0	0	0	2
2005–06	HC Havirov U20	Czech U20	40	6	18	24	77	—	—	—	—	—
2006–07	HC Pardubice	Czech	29	0	1	1	20	7	0	1	1	4
2006–07	HC Hradec Králové	Czech	22	1	3	4	32	5	1	2	3	6
2007–08	HC Pardubice	Czech	19	1	0	1	6	—	—	—	—	—
2007–08	HC Litvínov	Czech	23	1	6	7	30	—	—	—	—	—
2008–09	HC Pardubice	Czech	19	2	0	2	0	—	—	—	—	—
2008–09	HC Vrchlabí	Czech2	22	4	3	7	49	—	—	—	—	—
2008–09	HC Kometa Brno	Czech2	2	0	0	0	2	16	2	2	4	10
2009–10	HC Kometa Brno	Czech	21	0	3	3	30	—	—	—	—	—
2009–10	HC Olomouc	Czech2	1	0	0	0	0	10	2	4	6	8
2010–11	HC Kometa Brno	Czech	2	1	0	1	0	—	—	—	—	—
2010–11	HC Olomouc	Czech2	27	4	4	8	6	4	0	1	1	2
2011–12	HC Rebel Havlíčkův Brod	Czech2	28	7	3	10	18	5	0	0	0	6
2011–12	BK Mladá Boleslav	Czech	10	0	0	0	8	—	—	—	—	—
2011–12	HC Vitkovice	Czech	8	0	0	0	2	3	0	0	0	0
2012–13	HK Dukla Trencin	Slovak	29	4	9	13	40	—	—	—	—	—
2012–13	HC Slavia Praha	Czech	12	1	1	2	6	5	0	1	1	4
2013–14	HC AZ Havířov 2010	Czech2	38	4	11	15	63	—	—	—	—	—
2013–14	HC Banska Bystrica	Slovak	3	0	1	1	2	—	—	—	—	—
2014–15	Piráti Chomutov	Czech2	45	6	11	17	44	5	0	1	1	0
2015–16	Deggendorfer SC	Germany3	38	13	17	30	40	6	2	1	3	6
2016–17	EV Dingolfing	Germany5	—	—	—	—	—	—	—	—	—	—
2017–18	EV Dingolfing	Germany5	—	—	—	—	—	—	—	—	—	—
2018–19	EV Dingolfing	Germany5	—	—	—	—	—	—	—	—	—	—
Czech totals			143	6	11	17	102	35	3	3	6	32
Czech2 totals			185	26	35	61	214	45	5	10	15	32
