= Jaroslav (Pardubice District) =

- Municipality
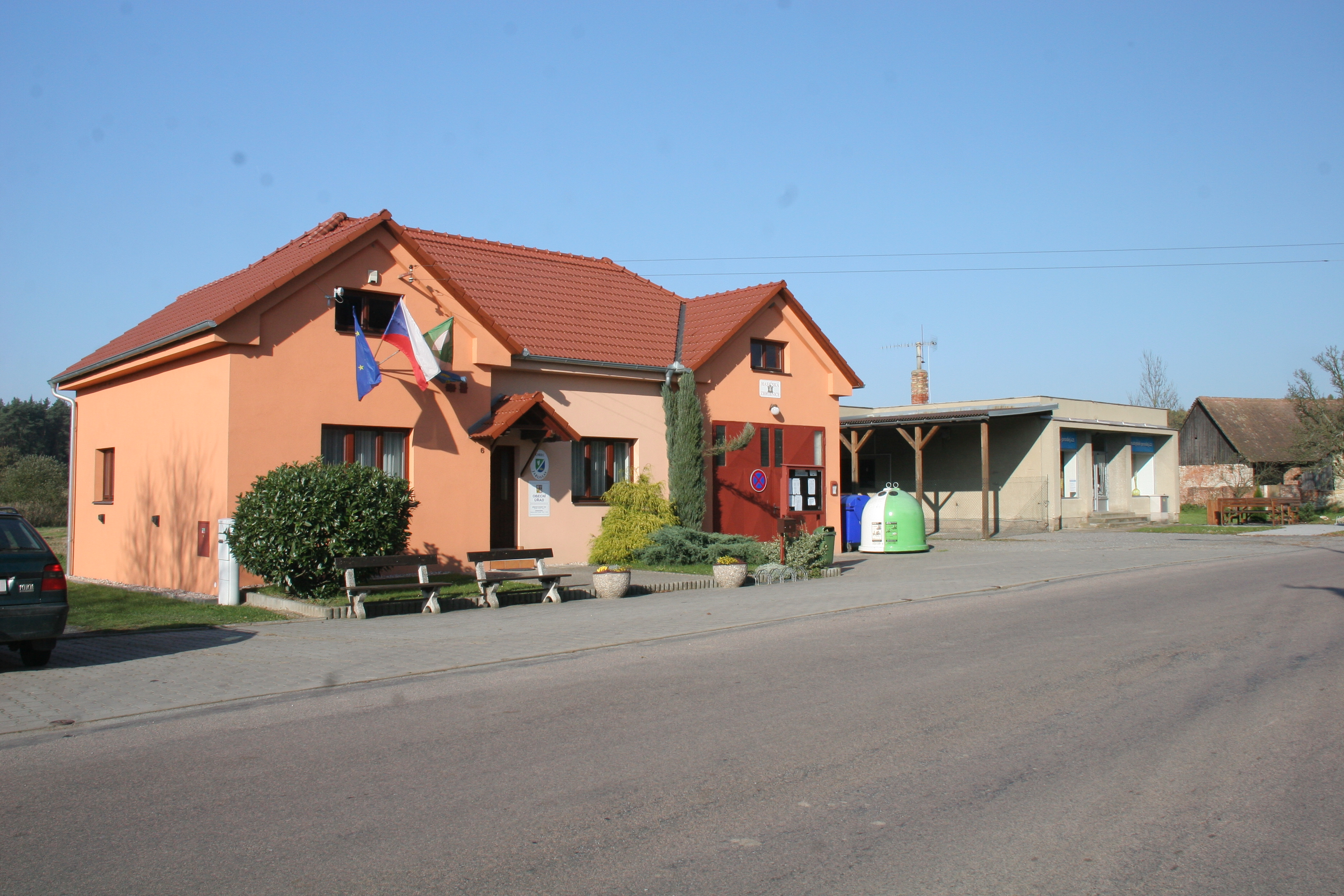
- Municipal office

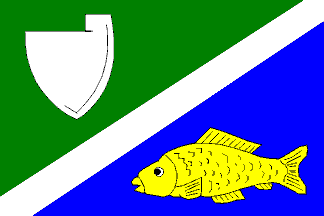
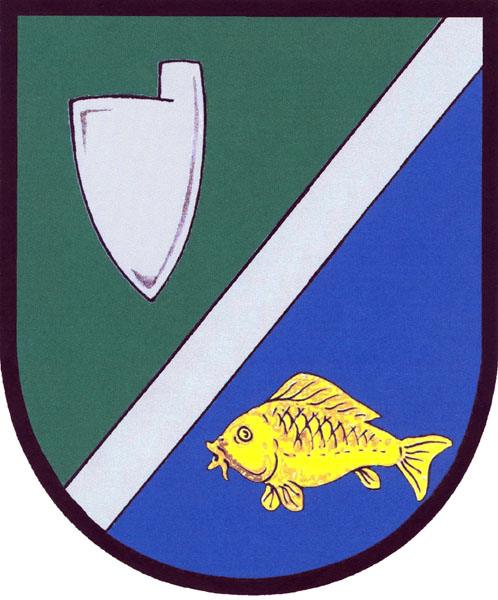
- Flag Coat of arms

- Location in the Czech Republic
- Coordinates: 50°0′44″N 16°4′41″E
- Country: Czech Republic
- Region: Pardubice
- District: Pardubice
- First mentioned: 1399

Area
  - Total: 4.94 km^{2} (1.91 sq mi)
- Elevation: 275 m (902 ft)

Population (2026-01-01)
  - Total: 269
  - Density: 54.5/km^{2} (141/sq mi)
- Time zone: UTC+1 (CET)
  - Summer (DST): UTC+2 (CEST)
- Postal code: 534 01
- Website: www.obec-jaroslav.cz

Jaroslav is a municipality and village in Pardubice District in the Pardubice Region of the Czech Republic. It has about 300 inhabitants.

== Demographics ==
Historical population
Year	Pop.	±%
1869	360	—
1880	345	−4.2%
1890	383	+11.0%
1900	300	−21.7%
1910	323	+7.7%
1921	324	+0.3%
1930	319	−1.5%
1950	265	−16.9%
1961	243	−8.3%
1970	227	−6.6%
1980	198	−12.8%
1991	199	+0.5%
2001	212	+6.5%
2011	225	+6.1%
2021	219	−2.7%
Source: Censuses
