= Jaroslav Kůs =

Czech ice hockey player

- Born: March 3, 1990 (age 36) Czechoslovakia
- Height: 6 ft 3 in (191 cm)
- Weight: 205 lb (93 kg; 14 st 9 lb)
- Position: Centre
- Shot: Left
- Played for: Piráti Chomutov; SK Kadaň; HC Děčín; HC Energie Karlovy Vary; HC Most
- NHL draft: Undrafted
- Playing career: 2008–2023

Jaroslav Kůs (born March 3, 1990) is a Czech professional ice hockey player. He currently plays with Piráti Chomutov in the Czech Extraliga.

Kůs made his Czech Extraliga debut playing with Piráti Chomutov debut during the 2012–13 Czech Extraliga season.

== Career statistics ==
			Regular season					Playoffs
Season	Team	League	GP	G	A	Pts	PIM	GP	G	A	Pts	PIM
2004–05	KLH Chomutov U18	Czech U18 3	23	9	11	20	16	—	—	—	—	—
2005–06	HC Litvínov U18	Czech U18	43	8	20	28	50	—	—	—	—	—
2006–07	HC Litvínov U18	Czech U18	36	8	15	23	26	—	—	—	—	—
2006–07	HC Chemopetrol U20	Czech U20	2	0	0	0	0	—	—	—	—	—
2007–08	HC Litvínov U20	Czech U20	10	0	0	0	4	—	—	—	—	—
2007–08	KLH Chomutov U20	Czech U20 2	—	—	—	—	—	—	—	—	—	—
2008–09	KLH Chomutov U20	Czech U20	35	11	19	30	16	3	1	3	4	2
2008–09	KLH Chomutov	Czech2	1	0	0	0	0	—	—	—	—	—
2008–09	SK Kadaň	Czech2	1	0	0	0	0	4	0	0	0	0
2009–10	KLH Chomutov U20	Czech U20	31	13	26	39	42	1	1	2	3	2
2009–10	KLH Chomutov	Czech2	15	2	4	6	10	—	—	—	—	—
2009–10	HC Děčín	Czech3	6	1	2	3	0	—	—	—	—	—
2010–11	KLH Chomutov U20	Czech U20	33	7	31	38	38	—	—	—	—	—
2010–11	KLH Chomutov	Czech2	32	8	9	17	14	—	—	—	—	—
2011–12	Piráti Chomutov U20	Czech U20	2	2	3	5	0	—	—	—	—	—
2011–12	Piráti Chomutov	Czech2	15	2	4	6	2	—	—	—	—	—
2011–12	SK Kadaň	Czech2	31	4	11	15	31	—	—	—	—	—
2012–13	Piráti Chomutov	Czech	12	0	4	4	4	—	—	—	—	—
2012–13	SK Kadaň	Czech2	35	1	13	14	28	—	—	—	—	—
2013–14	Piráti Chomutov	Czech	9	0	0	0	0	—	—	—	—	—
2013–14	SK Kadaň	Czech2	38	5	13	18	16	—	—	—	—	—
2014–15	SK Kadaň	Czech2	33	8	14	22	20	4	0	2	2	4
2015–16	HC Energie Karlovy Vary	Czech	33	2	13	15	14	—	—	—	—	—
2015–16	SK Kadaň	Czech2	18	7	11	18	16	—	—	—	—	—
2016–17	SK Trhači Kadaň	Czech2	44	10	32	42	55	—	—	—	—	—
2017–18	Piráti Chomutov	Czech	1	0	0	0	0	—	—	—	—	—
2017–18	HC Litvínov	Czech	3	0	0	0	0	—	—	—	—	—
2017–18	SK Trhači Kadaň	Czech2	37	10	13	23	46	—	—	—	—	—
2017–18	HC Most	Czech3	1	2	1	3	0	—	—	—	—	—
2018–19	SK Trhači Kadaň	Czech2	48	6	35	41	66	—	—	—	—	—
2019–20	SK Trhači Kadaň	Czech2	41	11	29	40	79	—	—	—	—	—
2020–21	Piráti Chomutov	Czech4	1	2	2	4	0	—	—	—	—	—
2021–22	Piráti Chomutov	Czech4	14	10	34	44	29	1	2	3	5	0
2022–23	Piráti Chomutov	Czech3	1	0	0	0	2	1	0	0	0	2
Czech totals			58	2	17	19	18	—	—	—	—	—
Czech2 totals			389	74	188	262	383	8	0	2	2	4
