= Jaroslav Hrbáček =

Czech academic and zoologist

Jaroslav Hrbáček (12 May 1921, in Brno – 16 July 2010, in Prague) was a Czech academic and zoologist.
