= Jaroslav Chlebek =

Slovak football player

Personal information
- Date of birth: 10 February 1976 (age 50)
- Height: 1.91 m (6 ft 3 in)
- Position: Midfielder

Senior career*
Years	Team	Apps	(Gls)
2009–2011	Třinec	36	(0)
Total		36	(0)
- * Club domestic league appearances and goals

Jaroslav Chlebek (born 10 February 1976) is a Slovak football player who plays as a defender. He plays for Czech 2. Liga side Fotbal Třinec where he is captain. Notable former clubs include MFK Ružomberok, SK Dynamo České Budějovice and Slovan Bratislava.
