= Jaroslav Moučka (ice hockey) =

Czech ice hockey player

- Born: September 10, 1992 (age 32); Czechoslovakia
- Height: 6 ft 1 in (185 cm)
- Weight: 207 lb (94 kg; 14 st 11 lb)
- Position: Forward
- Shoots: Right
- Czech Extraliga team: HC Pardubice
- NHL draft: Undrafted
- Playing career: 2012–present

Jaroslav Moučka (born September 10, 1992) is a Czech professional ice hockey forward.

== Career ==
Moučka made his Czech Extraliga debut playing with HC Pardubice during the 2013–14 Czech Extraliga season. He plays with HC Pardubice of the Czech Extraliga.
