= Jaroslav Starý (fencer) =

Czech fencer (1915–1989)

Personal information
- Born: 17 August 1915 Prague, Czechoslovakia
- Died: November 1989 (aged 74)

Sport
- Sport: Fencing

Jaroslav Starý (17 August 1915 – November 1989) was a Czech fencer. He competed in the individual and team sabre events at the 1948 Summer Olympics.
