= Jaroslav Ježek (designer) =

Czech industrial designer

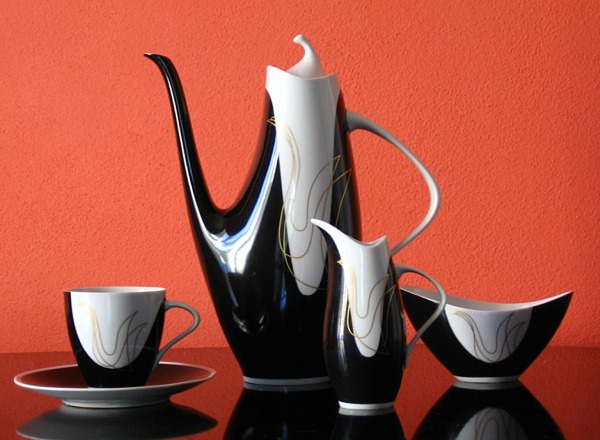
Porcelain set Elka by Jaroslav Ježek

Jaroslav Ježek (26 January 1923 – 23 July 2002) was a Czech industrial designer. He was one of the founders of the Brussels style, an important development in Czechoslovak design in 1950s and 60s. Ježek created 52 complete porcelain sets and more than one hundred designs for porcelain sculptures.

== Biography ==
Jaroslav Ježek, nephew of the Czech composer Jaroslav Ježek, was born in 1923 in Podlesí near Příbram. Between 1945 and 1949 he studied Art Education under Professor Sejpka, Cyril Bouda and Karel Lidický at Charles University in Prague but on the recommendation of Professor Eckert, of the Atelier of Porcelain and Ceramics (a department of the Prague Academy of Performing Arts) he decided to concentrate instead on industrial production. Ježek left Charles University for a scholarship place in the art department of the Thun porcelain manufactory in Klášterec nad Ohří, and remained there until 1954. In 1955 he was recruited by the new state-run industrial porcelain development center at Lesov, near Karlovy Vary.

In 1957 Ježek was invited to create designs for the Expo 58 in Brussels. His porcelain set Elka was exhibited there, and was awarded the Expo Grand Prix for Ceramics. Ježek also designed the porcelain set Asmanit for the Brussels' Expo restaurant. He was one of the leading exponents for the "Brussels style", which was characterised by the use of organic shapes, diagonal elements and surfaces marked by pastel shadows of yellow, purple, green, azure and gray. It later became a signature design style in many Czech households. Other exponents of the "Brussels style" applied it to synthetic materials such as plastics, laminates and Formica.

The success of Elka inspired Ježek to create similar extravagant sets of porcelain tableware. In 1959 his Ex, Manon and Tria designs were approved for production as luxury giftware, and his simpler Orava and Ciráno porcelain sets for everyday use. Other sets - Blanka and Hanka - were produced in 1960 and 1961, in Dalovice and Loket. In the 1960s, Ježek drew upon historical styles of the Baroque and the early 19th century, but also developed his own extravagant designs, with sets like Kleopatra and Giovanna (influenced by Elka), and original designs such as Ryby (Fishes). His works were influenced also by modern painting, and in addition to his designer tasks he was also an active painter. Ježek remained in the Lesov development center up to his retirement.

He died on 23 July 2002, in Karlovy Vary.

== Selected works ==
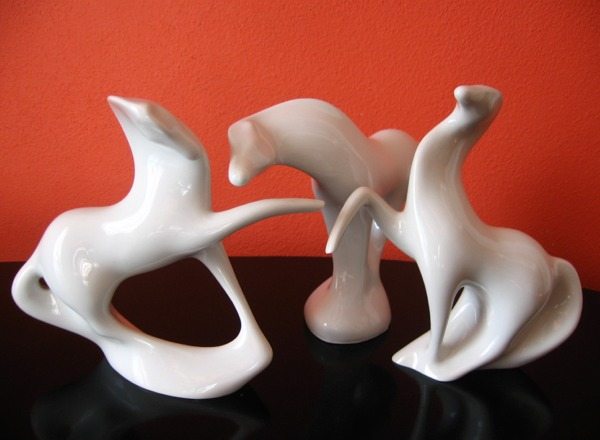
Mare and Stallions, porcelain sculptures by the Czech designer Jaroslav Ježek

Porcelain sculptures

- 1958 - Hřebečkové (Stallions), Klisnička (Mare), Volavky (Herons)
- 1959 - Páv (Peacock), Jitro (Morning)
- 1963 - Velký býk (Big Bull)

Porcelain sets

- 1956 - Oblázek (Peeble) - (unrealized)
- 1957 - Elka
- 1958 - Asmanit (ovenware porcelain)
- 1959 - Ex, Tria, Manon, Orava
- 1963 - Rafaela
- 1966 - Romana
- 1964 - Nefertiti

== Awards ==
- 1958 - Grand Prix at the Expo 58 in Brussels (porcelain sculptures Mare and Stallions)
- 1958 - Grand Prix at the Expo 58 in Brussels (porcelain set Elka)
- 1962 - Gold medal at the International Exhibition of Ceramic AIC in Prague (collection of figural sculptures)
- 1962 - Gold medal at the International Exhibition of Ceramic AIC in Prague (collection of utilitarian porcelain)
- 1963 - State Award for excellent work
- 1967 - Silver medal at the International Exhibition of Ceramic AIC in Istanbul (porcelain set Romana)
