= Jaroslav Starý (footballer) =

Czech footballer (born 1988)

Personal information
- Date of birth: 9 February 1988 (age 38)
- Place of birth: Czechoslovakia
- Height: 1.81 m (5 ft 11 in)
- Position: Defender

Team information
- Current team: Vlašim
- Number: 14

Senior career*
Years	Team	Apps	(Gls)
2009–2010	Slavia Prague	2	(0)
2010–	Slovácko	3	(0)
2011	→ Viktoria Žižkov (loan)	9	(0)
2012–	→ Vlašim (loan)	14	(1)

International career^{‡}
2003–2004	Czech Republic U16	7	(2)
2004–2005	Czech Republic U17	11	(2)
2005–2006	Czech Republic U18	9	(2)
- * Club domestic league appearances and goals as of 30 June 2012 ‡ National team caps and goals as of 31 December 2011

Jaroslav Starý (born 9 February 1988) is a Czech football player who is currently playing for Vlašim, on loan from 1. FC Slovácko. He started his professional career at Slavia Prague, where he made his Gambrinus liga debut against Teplice on 13 March 2010. He has represented his country at under-18 level.
