= Jaroslav Ježek (chess player) =

Czech chess player

Personal information
- Born: 9 March 1926
- Died: 1998 (aged 71–72)

Chess career
- Country: Czechoslovakia; Czech Republic
- Title: ICCF Grandmaster (1985)
- ICCF rating: 2457 (April 2000)
- ICCF peak rating: 2517 (July 1995)

Jaroslav Ježek (9 March 1926 – 1998) was a Czech chess player who held the ICCF title of International Correspondence Chess Grandmaster (1985). He was a European Team Chess Championship team medalist (1957).

== Biography ==
In the 1950s Jaroslav Ježek was one of the leading Czechoslovak chess players. He repeatedly competed in the Czechoslovak Chess Championship finals.

Jaroslav Ježek played for Czechoslovakia in the Chess Olympiad:

- In 1956, at second reserve board in the 12th Chess Olympiad in Moscow (+3, =6, -2).

Jaroslav Ježek played for Czechoslovakia in the European Team Chess Championship:

- In 1957, at tenth board in the 1st European Team Chess Championship in Vienna (+1, =3, -1) and won team bronze medal.

In later years, Ježek actively participated in correspondence chess tournaments. In 1956-1959, he participated in 2nd World Correspondence Chess Championship and ranked in 10th place. In 1985, Jaroslav Ježek was awarded the International Correspondence Chess Grandmaster (GMC) title.
