= Vyšehoří =

- Municipality
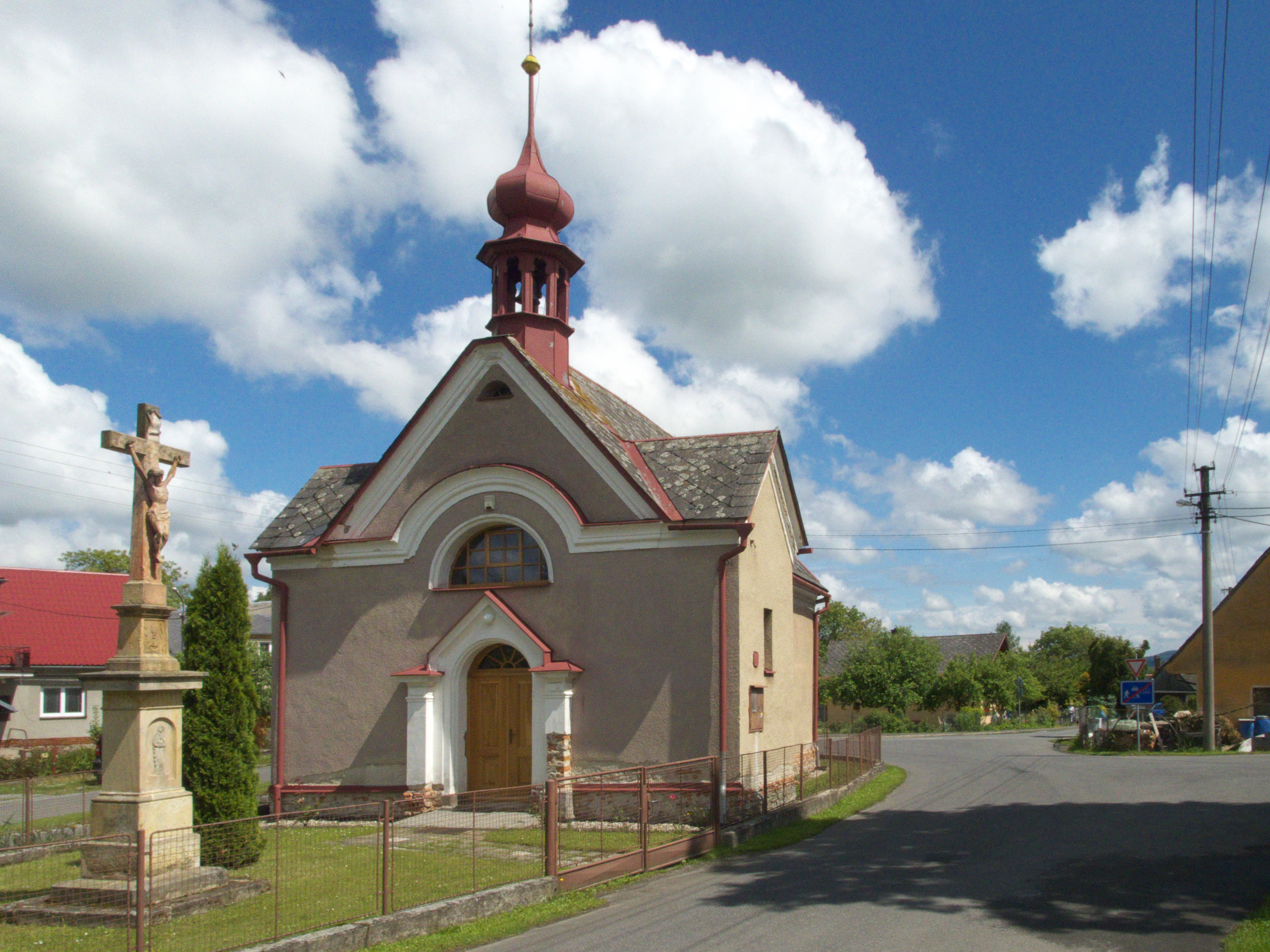
- Chapel of Saint John of Nepomuk

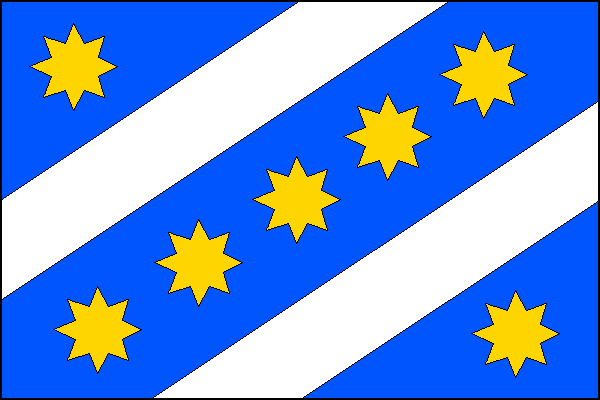
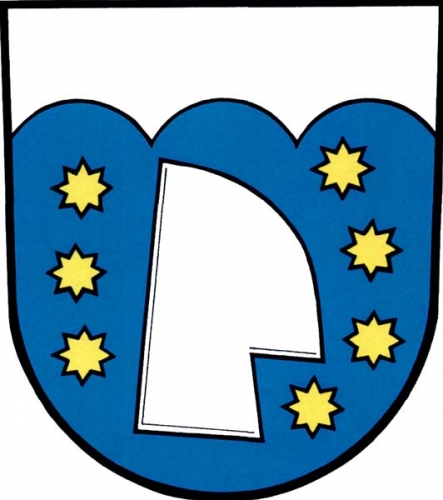
- Flag Coat of arms

- Location in the Czech Republic
- Coordinates: 49°56′1″N 16°52′42″E
- Country: Czech Republic
- Region: Olomouc
- District: Šumperk
- First mentioned: 1397

Area
  - Total: 3.47 km^{2} (1.34 sq mi)
- Elevation: 324 m (1,063 ft)

Population (2026-01-01)
  - Total: 284
  - Density: 81.8/km^{2} (212/sq mi)
- Time zone: UTC+1 (CET)
  - Summer (DST): UTC+2 (CEST)
- Postal codes: 789 01
- Website: www.vysehori.cz

Vyšehoří (German: Wyschehor) is a municipality and village in Šumperk District in the Olomouc Region of the Czech Republic. It has about 300 inhabitants.

== Etymology ==
The name Vyšehoří is derived from the phrase výše v horách, i.e. 'higher in the mountains'. It refers to its hilly location.

== Geography ==
Vyšehoří is located about 7 kilometres (4 mi) west of Šumperk and 45 km (28 mi) northwest of Olomouc. It lies mostly in the Zábřeh Highlands, only the southern part of the municipal territory extends into the Mohelnice Depression. The highest point is at 550 m (1,804 ft) above sea level.

== History ==
The first written mention of Vyšehoří is from 1397, when it became property of Petr of Kravaře. The Lords of Kravaře owned it as part of the Ruda estate until 1442, when they sold the estate to the Tunkl of Brníčko family. Vyšehoří became part of the Zábřeh estate, which remained so until fall of the feudal system in 1848.

== Demographics ==
Historical population

Year	Pop.	±%
1869	291	—
1880	278	−4.5%
1890	268	−3.6%
1900	294	+9.7%
1910	300	+2.0%

Year	Pop.	±%
1921	291	−3.0%
1930	311	+6.9%
1950	241	−22.5%
1961	252	+4.6%
1970	233	−7.5%

Year	Pop.	±%
1980	206	−11.6%
1991	169	−18.0%
2001	197	+16.6%
2011	215	+9.1%
2021	247	+14.9%

Source: Censuses

== Transport ==
The I/11 road, which connects Hradec Králové with Šumperk and continues further to Ostrava, runs along the eastern municipal border.

== Sights ==
There are no protected cultural monuments in the municipality. The main landmark is the Chapel of Saint John of Nepomuk.
