= Brníčko =

- Municipality
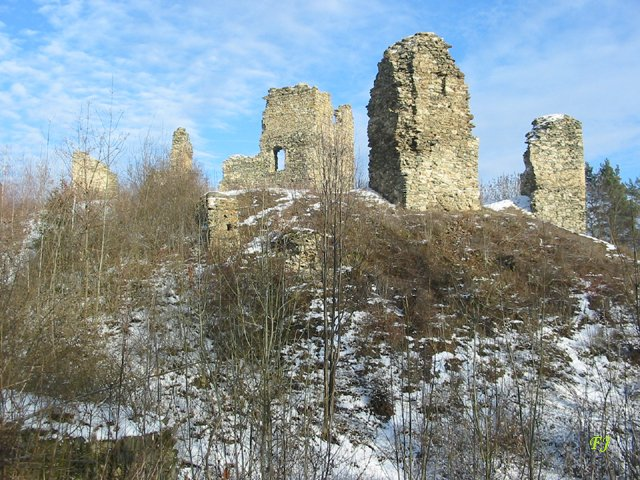
- Brníčko Castle ruins

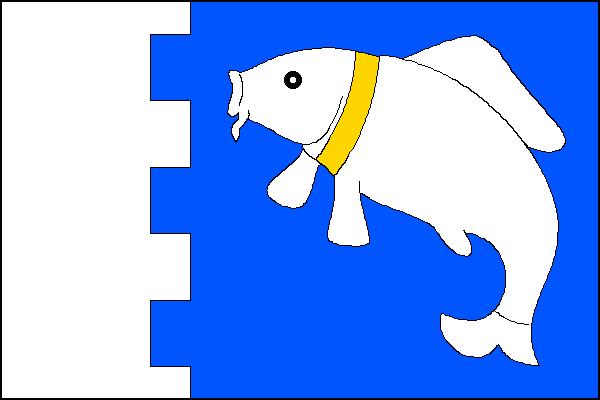
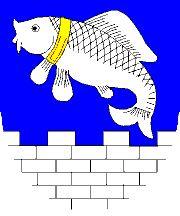
- Flag Coat of arms

- Location in the Czech Republic
- Coordinates: 49°53′42″N 16°58′6″E
- Country: Czech Republic
- Region: Olomouc
- District: Šumperk
- First mentioned: 1350

Area
  - Total: 8.49 km^{2} (3.28 sq mi)
- Elevation: 300 m (980 ft)

Population (2026-01-01)
  - Total: 635
  - Density: 74.8/km^{2} (194/sq mi)
- Time zone: UTC+1 (CET)
  - Summer (DST): UTC+2 (CEST)
- Postal codes: 789 75
- Website: obecbrnicko.cz

Brníčko is a municipality and village in Šumperk District in the Olomouc Region of the Czech Republic. It has about 600 inhabitants.

== Administrative division ==
Brníčko consists of two municipal parts (in brackets population according to the 2021 census):

- Brníčko (561)
- Strupšín (80)

== Geography ==
Brníčko is located about 8 kilometres (5 mi) south of Šumperk and 38 km (24 mi) northwest of Olomouc. It lies in the Hanušovice Highlands. The highest point is at 587 m (1,926 ft) above sea level. The built-up area is situated in the valley of the Loučka Stream.

== History ==
The first written mention of Brníčko is from 1350. The local castle was the seat of the aristocratic Tunkl of Brníčko family. From the late 14th century until the Thirty Years' War, Brníčko was a small town and the centre of a small estate. After the war, it was acquired by the Liechtenstein family and lost its significance.

== Demographics ==
Historical population

Year	Pop.	±%
1869	871	—
1880	927	+6.4%
1890	938	+1.2%
1900	1,034	+10.2%
1910	1,090	+5.4%

Year	Pop.	±%
1921	964	−11.6%
1930	1,015	+5.3%
1950	731	−28.0%
1961	760	+4.0%
1970	727	−4.3%

Year	Pop.	±%
1980	689	−5.2%
1991	604	−12.3%
2001	615	+1.8%
2011	620	+0.8%
2021	641	+3.4%

Source: Censuses

== Transport ==
There are no railways or major roads passing through the municipality.

== Sights ==
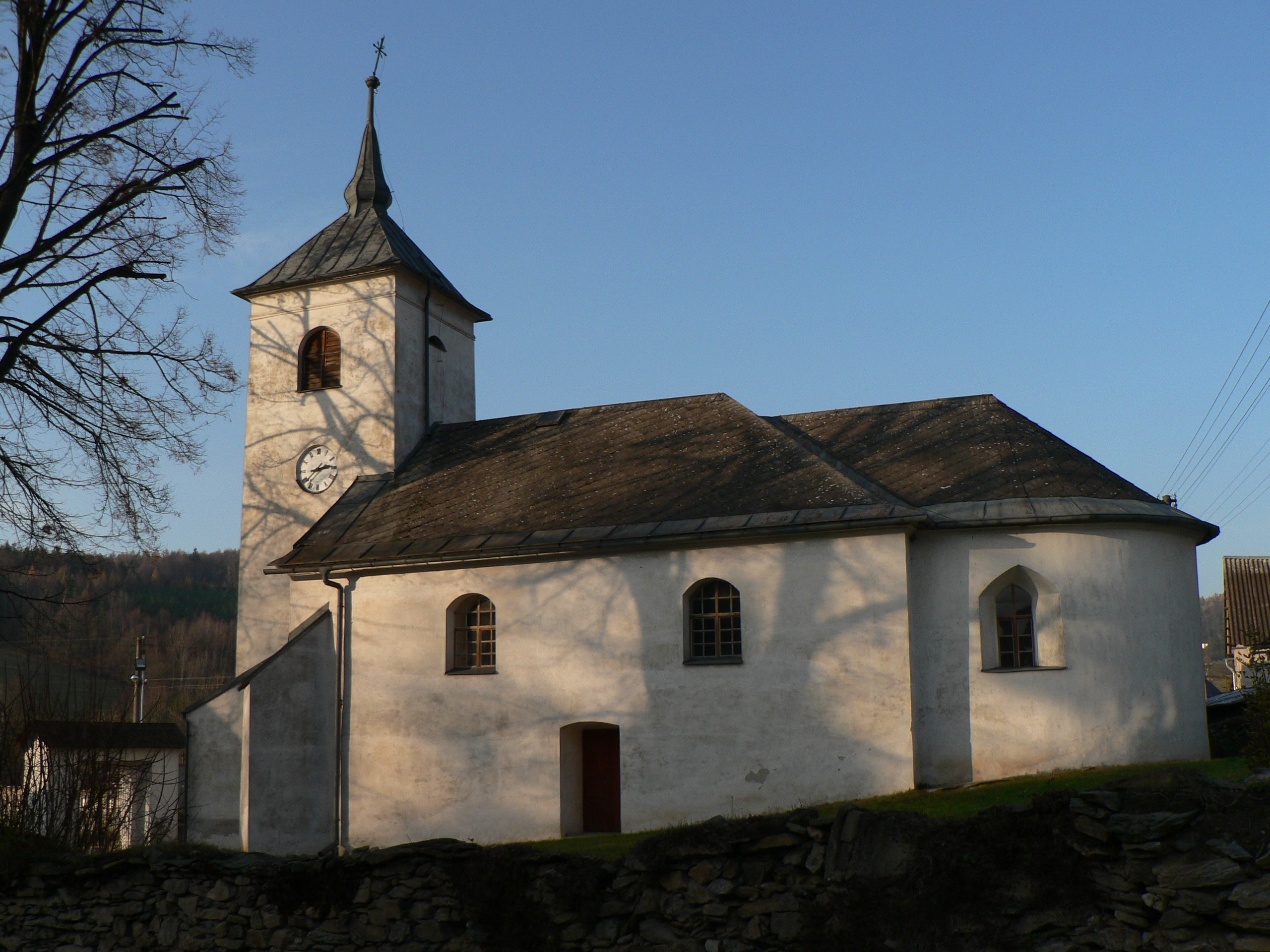
Church of the Nativity of the Virgin Mary

The main tourist destination is the ruin of Brníčko Castle. It is a significant landmark of the landscape, located on a hill above the village of Brníčko. It was built in the 1330s and first documented in 1356. The high walls of the northeastern palace, three massive fortification pillars, and other elements have been preserved to this day.

The Church of the Nativity of the Virgin Mary is a simple rural church. It is a unique example of Romanesque architecture in the region. Baroque modifications were made, but the Romanesque character has been preserved.
