= Ctirad Kohoutek =

Ctirad Kohoutek (18 March 1929 in Zábřeh, Czechoslovakia – 19 September 2011 in Brno, Czech Republic) was a contemporary Czech composer, music theorist, and pedagogue.

== Life ==
In 1948–1949 he studied composition, musical theory and conducting under the famous composers Vilém Petrželka, Jan Šoupal, and Jaroslav Kvapil at the Brno Conservatory, later at the Janáček Academy of Music and Performing Arts in Brno. In 1963, he attended the Summer School of Music in Dartington, he attended also courses of Pierre Boulez and György Ligeti in Darmstadt (1965). He worked as a teacher at the JAMU in Brno. Since 1980 he was appointed the director of the Czech Philharmonic.

He is the brother of astronomer Luboš Kohoutek, who named the minor planet he discovered in 1975, 2375 Radek in his honor.

== Selected works ==
Stage

- O Kohoutkovi a Slepičce (The Cockerel and the Little Hen), Short Opera for children's soloists, children's choir and instrumental ensemble (1988–1989); libretto by Vladimír Šefl

Orchestral

- Festivalová předehra (Festival Overture) (1955–1956)
- Velký přelom (Great Turning Point), Symphony (1960–1962)
- Symfonické tance (Symphonic Dances) (1961)
- Sinfonietta (1962–1963)
- Preludia (Preludes) for chamber orchestra (1965)
- Miniatury (Miniatures) for string orchestra (1966)
- Divadlo světa (Theatre of the World; Teatro del mondo), Symphonic Rotation in Four Scenes (1968–1969)
- Panteon, Sound Image (1970)
- Slavnostní prolog (Festive Prologue) (1971)
- Slavnosti světla (Celebrations of Light), Cycle of Symphonic Pictures (1974–1975)
- Symfonické aktuality (Symphonic Actualities), Concert Frescoes (1976–1978)
- Pocta životu (Honour to Life; Omaggio a vita), Symphonic Monolith (1988–1989)
- Jediná naděje (The Only Hope; L'unica speranza), Symphonic Watercolor (1997)
- Pohledy na člověka (Views of Man), 2 Reflections (1989–1997)

Wind band

- Symfonický tanec (Symphonic Dance) for symphonic band (2001–2004)

Concertante

- Concerto for violin and orchestra (1958); also for violin and piano (1987)
- Concertino for cello and chamber orchestra (1964–1966)

Chamber music

- Sonatina semplice for oboe and piano (1950, revised 1991)
- Suita romantica for viola and piano (1957)
- Suita giocosa (Suite Giocosa) for wind quintet (1958–1959, revised 1992)
- String Quartet (1959)
- Concertino for cello and piano (1964–1966)
- Dvě allegra (Due allegri) for clarinet and piano (1965, revised 1992)
- Miniatury (Miniatures) for 4 horns (1965), or for 4 saxophones (2005)
- Memento, Concerto for percussion and wind instruments (1966)
- Panychida (Prayer for the Dead), Music in Two Sound Layers for 2 violas, 2 pianos, percussion and tape (1968)
- Tkaniny doby (Tissues of Time), Sound Fantasies for bass clarinet (or cello) and piano with percussion (1977)
- Metavariace na dvě moravské lidové písně (Metavariations on Two Moravian Folk Songs) for accordion (1978), or organ (1982)
- Minuty jara (Minutes of Spring), Impressions for wind quintet (1980)
- Mateníky, 3 Pieces for 2 accordions or accordion ensemble (1986, 1991)
- Motivy léta (Motifs of Summer), Musical Experiences for violin, cello and piano (1990)
- Žerty a úsměvy (Jokes and Smiles), Novelettes for oboe, clarinet and bassoon (1991)
- V zahradách chrámů Kyota (In Kyoto Temple Gardens), Meditation for English horn (or bass clarinet) and percussion (1992)
- Šťastné chvilky (Happy Moments), Little Album of Memories for 2 violins (1992), or for flute and violin (2007)
- Zimní ticha (Winter Silence), Impressions and Thoughts for brass and percussion (1992–1993)
- Oživené zátiší (Still Life Revived), Fragment for horn (1994), or bassoon, or tenor saxophone (1995–1997)
- Podzimní zpěvy (Autumn Songs), Rhapsodic Movements for string quartet (1994–1995)
- Proměny vody (Water Metamorphoses), Poetic Sketches for 4 flutes (1996)
- Protipóly (Opposite Poles), Duo for 2 trumpets (1998–1999)
- Kouzlo dřeva (The Magic of Wood), Sculptures by Antonín Suchan for violin and piano (1999–2000)
- Drobné radosti (Small Joys), Movements for flute with string quartet (2006)
- Doušky z pramenů (Sips from the Spring), Duo for violin and oboe (or clarinet) (2007)

Organ

- Rapsodia eroica (1963–1965)
- Metavariace na dvě moravské lidové písně (Metavariations on Two Moravian Folk Songs) (1978, 1982); original version for accordion
- Dávno je tomu... (Long Ago Is It...), Mosaic Album Leaf (1998)

Piano

- Letní den (A Summer Day), Notes from Childhood (1944, revised 1996)
- Invence (Inventions) (1965)
- Loutkové scény (Puppet Scenes), Cycle of Short Pieces (1969)
- Prvosenky (Primroses), Piano Sketches from Youth (2002)
- Malá hudební pohoda (A Little Musical Relaxation), Suite (2004)

Vocal

- Z Hané (From Hanakia), Songs in Folk Tone for baritone and piano (1950, revised 1991); word by Ondřej Přikryl
- Za všechny děti: Ukolébavka černošské mámy (For All Children: Black Mama's Lullaby), Cantata for alto, mixed chorus and orchestra (1951–1952); words by Jiří Navrátil
- Balady z povstání (Jano – Jablíčka malinová) (Ballads from the Uprising), 2 Cantatas to words by Jarmila Urbánková (1960)
- Pátý živel (The Fifth Element), Melodrama for reciter and small orchestra (or organ, piano and percussion) (1962); words by Oldřich Mikulášek
- Lyrické texty (Lyrical Texts), 3 Songs for 2 mezzo-sopranos, piano and percussion (1976); words by Vladimíra Binarová, Eva Hřibová and Josef Pavlík
- Zrození člověka (The Birth of Man), Vocal Monologues for high male and female voices and orchestra (or piano) (1981); words by Czech poets
