= Jaroslav Miller =

Czech historian (born 1971)

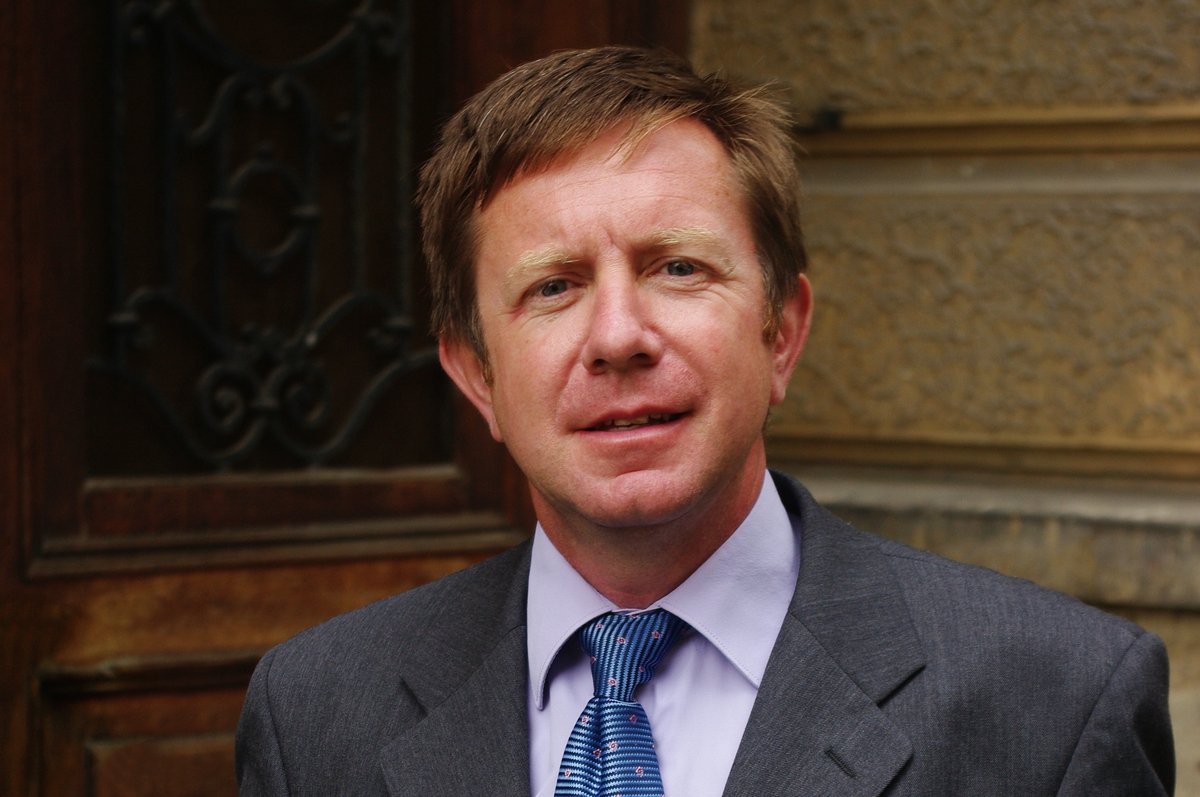
Jaroslav Miller

Jaroslav Miller (born 8 January 1971) is a Czech historian who is a professor of history and rector at Palacký University in Olomouc. His focus is urban studies, the history of political thought and more recently also issues related to Czech and Slovak exile.

== Life ==
Miller was born in Šumperk. He studied history and philology at Palacký University in Olomouc, Central European University in Budapest, and Lady Margaret Hall at the University of Oxford. His teachers included Josef Jařab, Ralf Dahrendorf, Stephen Greenblatt and Robert John Weston Evans.

He has taken part in many long-term fellowships at universities and scientific institutions in Canada, Hungary, United States, Great Britain, Germany and Australia. He was twice appointed a fellow of the German scientific Alexander von Humboldt Foundation (2006 in Marburg, 2010 in Münster) and the American Andrew W. Mellon Foundation (2004, 2010 Wolfenbüttel). In 2008 he was a Fulbright Fellow at Georgia College and State University. During the 2010–2011 academic year, he held a Guest Professorship at the University of Western Australia in Perth. In 2012, the US Ambassador appointed him a Fulbright Program Ambassador to the Czech Republic. In the same year he was appointed professor of history.

In 2008 the British publishing house Ashgate Publishing published his monograph Urban Societies in East-Central Europe, 1500–1700. In 2010 he published in New York and Budapest (together with László Kontler) the monograph Friars, Nobles and Burghers – Sermons, Images and Prints: Studies of Culture and Society in Early-Modern Europe.

On 16 October 2013 he was elected as the Rector of Palacký University for the period 2014–2018. His term began on 1 February 2014.

== Awards ==
Miller has received several academic and scientific awards. In 2005 he was awarded the "R. John Rath Prize for Best Study in Habsburg History" or "Best Urban History Monograph Award".

== Selected works ==
Miller's monographic scientific works include:

- Urban Societies in East-Central Europe, 1500 – 1700, (Ashgate: Aldershot – New York, 2008).
- The Palatine Myth: Frederick V. and the Image of the Bohemian War in Early Stuart England, (ARGO: Prague, 2004).
- The Birth of Leviathan Postponed: The Crisis of the Stuart Monarchy, 1603 – 1641, (ARGO: Prague, 2006).
- The Closed Society and its Enemies: The City in East Central Europe (1500 – 1700), (Nakladatelství Lidové noviny: Prague, 2006).
- John Barclay – Argenis: Intellectual Roots of European Absolutism, (Nakladatelství Lidové noviny: Prague, 2009).
- With László Kontler: Friars, Nobles and Burghers – Sermons, Images and Prints: Studies in Culture and Society in Early Modern Europe (New York – Budapest: CEU Press, 2010).
