= Radoslav Nenadál =

Czech writer and translator (1929–2018)

- Born: 30 October 1929; Šumperk, Czechoslovakia
- Died: 17 July 2018 (aged 88)
- Education: Charles University
- Occupations: Writer, translator
- Writing career
- Language: Czech (and translations from English to Czech)

Radoslav Nenadál (30 October 1929 – 17 July 2018) was a Czech writer and translator of English-language literature.

He was born on 30 October 1929 in Šumperk, but in his childhood, he moved to Prague with his family. He then studied English and Czech at the Philosophical Faculty of Charles University. After studying, he began to work as a college educator.

He translated into Czech, for example, works by Ernest Hemingway, Truman Capote, John Irving and others. His translations include the novel Sophie's Choice by American prose writer William Styron. In 1981, Nenadal won the Translation Section Award for the Philosopher and Oyster Book of James Thurber, as well as the Odeon Prize for Work in American Literature. In 2017 he was brought to the Hall of Fame by the Municipality of Translators.

He wrote several novels such as Rakvářova dcera a jiné prózy (1985), Přijď zpět (anebo radši ne), Dušinky (1989), Gaudeamus či My tě zazdíme, Aido, dále Škorpión, Zahrada či Sešitky chrámové pěvkyně.

He died on 17 July 2018 at the age of 88.
