= Gerda Frömel =

Czechoslovak sculptor (1931–1975)

- Gerda Frömel
- Born: 1931; Šumperk, Czechoslovakia
- Died: 3 August 1975 (aged 43–44); County Mayo, Ireland
- Known for: Sculpture

Gerda Frömel (1931 – 3 August 1975) was a sculptor, born in Czechoslovakia, who lived for an extended period in Ireland, where her work received critical acclaim. She received commissions for sculpture and stained glass and exhibited at the Irish Exhibition of Living Art, the Independent Artists Exhibition, and The Dawson Gallery. She received awards from the Arts Council, the Royal Institute of the Architects of Ireland and the Waterford Glass Company.

== Personal life ==
Gerda Frömel was born in Czechoslovakia in 1931, the eldest of four daughters, to an Austrian mother and German father. Her parents were forcibly required to leave shortly after the Second World War, in 1945, and try to return to Germany as refugees. They tried to settle in Austria and finally in Stuttgart.

Frömel studied sculpture at the Arts Schools in Stuttgart, Darmstadt and Munich from 1948 to 1952.

Frömel met Werner Schürmann while in college in Munich. They married in 1955 and moved to Ireland in 1956, as Schürmann had been offered a post teaching metalwork at the National College of Art and Design.

The couple lived in Woodtown Park, outside Rathfarnham, where Schürmann started a foundry. They had four sons and a daughter. Their daughter died aged two in a drowning accident. In 1966 Schürmann left Ireland and went back to Germany to become an opera singer. The couple didn't formally split for some years after, hoping to make the arrangement work.

== Exhibiting and awards ==
It was in Ireland that she began to exhibit her work. She worked on commissions including a particularly well-known piece called Sails for P.J.Carroll and Son, Dundalk. This was, at the time, the largest private sculptural commission in Ireland. Frömel also worked in stained glass for churches in Ireland and Germany, including a stained glass window at St Brigid's Cathedral, Kildare. In 1957 she began to annually exhibit in the Irish Exhibition of Living Art (IELA), while in 1962 and 1963 she exhibited at the Independent Artists Exhibition 1962 and 1963. In 1964 and 1970 she had a solo exhibition in The Dawson Gallery, and a joint show there with Michael Scott in 1967.

Frömel's work achieved critical acclaim. She won the Arts Council sculpture scholarship, the sculpture prize in the Irish Church Art Exhibition and the Royal Institute of the Architects of Ireland award in 1962. She received the Waterford Glass Company Award at the Oireachtas Art Exhibition in 1970. In 1973 she won a gold medal Oireachtas award for sculpture.

== Death and legacy ==
Frömel died in a drowning accident on 3 August 1975 aged 44. Retrospectives of her work were held at the IELA in 1975, with a special display and a tribute to her; a more substantial one at the Municipal Gallery the following year; and in 2015 in the FE McWilliam Gallery, Banbridge.

Her work is held in many public collections, including the Irish Museum of Modern Art, the Carroll's Collection and the Bank of Ireland. It has been included in landmark exhibitions such as ‘The Moderns’ (2010–2011), ensuring that her work "continues to be considered within the canon of Irish and international Modernism".
