= Eugen Brixel =

Austrian composer, musician and musicologist

Eugen Brixel (27 March 1939 – 16 October 2000) was an Austrian composer, musician and musicologist. The focus of his work was international wind music research.

== Life ==
Brixel was born in 1939 in Šumperk. After the World War II, driven out by the Czechs, his family finally arrived in Vienna, where he completed his compulsory schooling with the school brothers. At first, Eugen Brixel learned the profession of druggist, in accordance with his parents' wishes. On 12 June 1956 he passed the druggist's examination, but his passion belonged to playing the clarinet.

From the age of sixteen he studied the clarinet with Leopold Wlach and Karl Österreicher at the Vienna Music Academy (today the University of Music and Performing Arts Vienna) and graduated with distinction in 1962. After passing the Externistenmatura on 11 October 1960, he also studied theatre studies, musicology and psychology at the University of Vienna, where he obtained a doctorate in Dr. phil. on 16 July 1967.

In 1964, Brixel married his wife Eva Leeb, in 1965 his daughter Constanze Viola was born and in 1973 his daughter Regine Cosima.

He served in the military from 1967 to 1969 with the Gardemusik Vienna and the Militärmusik Salzburg and passed the military conductor's examination in Vienna on 7 November 1968. Between 1969 and 1974 Eugen Brixel was head of the municipal music school in Feldbach. He founded the theatre association "Die Theatraliker", initiated the Feldbach Summer Festival, was the initiator of a big band and took over the direction of the Stadtmusik Feldbach.

In the Styrian Wind Music Association he was first active from 1970 as regional youth advisor, then from 1978 as federal youth advisor in the Austrian Wind Music Association (ÖBV), before the ÖBV appointed him federal bandmaster in 1989. He retained this function until his death.

At the Graz University of Music, Eugen Brixel worked as a university assistant from 1972, and from 1978 as a professor (LI) until his death in 2000. At the Graz University of the Arts, Eugen Brixel was active in the field of wind didactics, as conductor of the university wind orchestra and through the establishment and direction of the wind orchestra conductor course. In the three international organisations in the bosom of UNESCO dedicated to specific questions of wind music, he was anchored in the presidium: in the CISM as chairman of the music advisory board, in the IGEB (International Society for the Research and Promotion of Wind Music) as vice-president and in the WASBE (World Association for Symphonic Bands and Ensembles) as an advisory board member.

Brixel succumbed to cancer on 16 October 2000, aged 61.

== Prizes and awards ==
- 1983: Ehrenzeichen des Landes Steiermark
- 1997: Ehrenzeichen für Verdienste um die Republik Österreich
- 2000: Ehrenzeichen des Landes Steiermark

== Work ==
=== Solo and ensemble works ===
- Audiamus igitur – Burlesque for 2 trumpets, horn, trombone, tuba, Verlag Möseler, 1982
- Sonatine für Klarinette solo

=== Works for wind orchestra ===
- Bagatellen – ein österreichisches Divertimento in 4 Sätzen, Verlag Helbling
- Esmeralda – Musik aus Südeuropa, Verlag Kliment
- Transatlantic – Rhapsodie, Verlag Adler
- Viennensia – Suite, Verlag Helbling
- Apropos Strauss – zeitgenössische Originalmusik, Verlag Helbling
- Disneyland – Suite, Verlag Kliment
- Salut an Carl Michael (paraphrase), Konzertmusik, Verlag Ziehrer
- Play Fahrbach, Verlag Kliment
- Jungbläser-Parade – Konzertmarsch, Verlag Helbling
- Musica Solemnis – Sakrale Musik, Verlag Helbling

=== Arrangements ===
- Harmoniemusik D72 (C), Schubert Franz
- Ouvertüre für Harmoniemusik, Viktorin Hallmayr

=== Stage music ===
- Rittercocktail (Musical, 1961)
- Politik im Walzertakt oder Virginia und der Kaiser (musical, libretto: Hermann Demel, 1968)
- Die deutschen Kleinstädter (1971)
- Rapunzel (Märchen, 1982)
- Lippl vulgo Faust (Volksstück von Gerda Klimek, 1993)

== Publications ==
- Die Blasmusik und ihre instrumentengeschichtliche Entwicklung, 1976, Oberneukirchen
- Klarinetten-Bibliographie I, 1977, Wilhelmshaven
- Der Jungmusiker, 1980, Oberneukirchen.
- Bericht über die vierte Internationale Fachtagung zur Erforschung der Blasmusik, Uster/Schweiz.
- with Wolfgang Suppan: Das große steirische Blasmusikbuch, 1981, Vienna
- (with Martin und Pils): Das ist Österreichs Militärmusik, 1982, Graz
- Das große oberösterreichische Blasmusikbuch, Brandstätter, Vienna; Munich 1984. ISBN 978-3-85447-031-1
- Die Klarinette und das Saxophon, 1983, Oberneukirchen
- (with M. Schönherr): Karl Komzak. Vater – Sohn – Enkel, 1989, Vienna
- Essays in specialist journals
- Co-editor of the book series "Alta musica", 1975–2000.
- Published by E. Rameis: Die österreichische Militärmusik – von ihren Anfängen bis zum Jahr 1918, 1976, Tutzing 1976
