= 2013 Palacký University Rector election =

← 2009	16 October 2013	2017 →
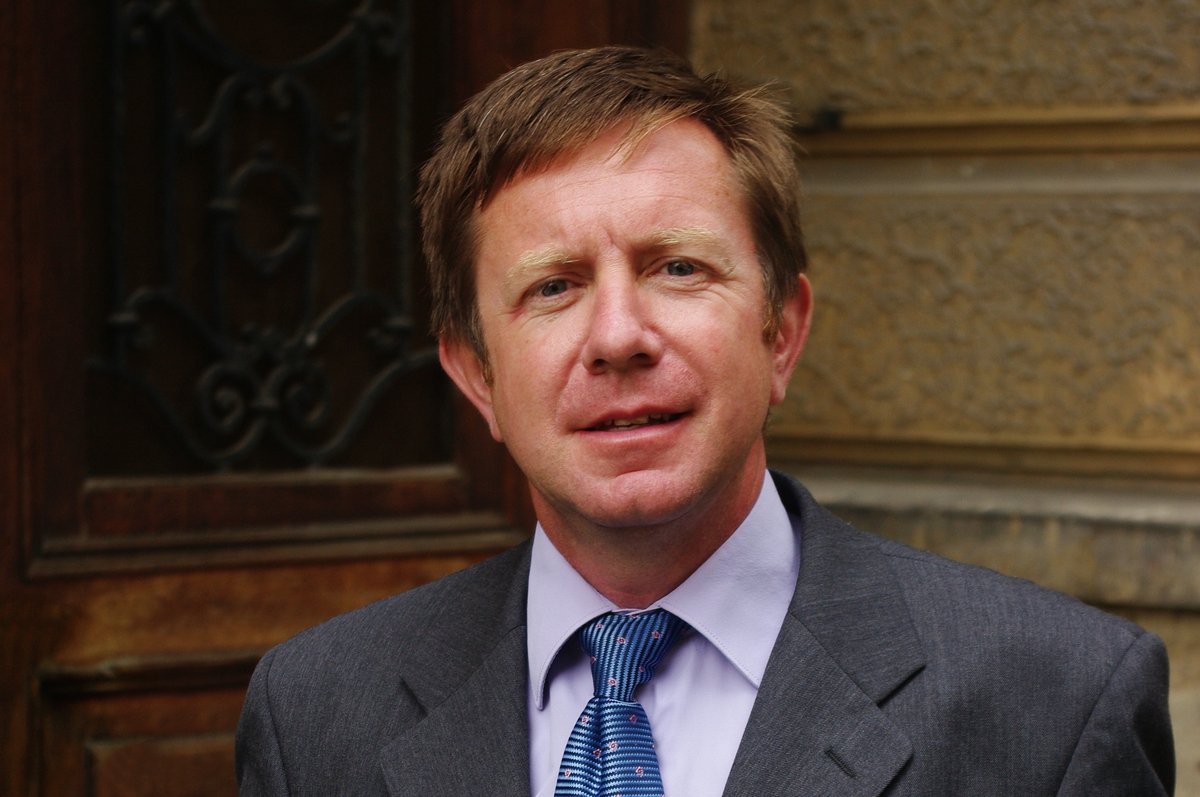

Candidate	Jaroslav Miller	Miroslav Mašláň
Electoral vote	15	9
Percentage	62.5%	37.5%
Rector before election
Miroslav Mašláň
Elected Rector
Jaroslav Miller

Rector election was held at Palacký University on 16 October 2013. Historian Jaroslav Miller defeated the incumbent Rector Miroslav Mašláň.

== Candidates ==
- Miroslav Mašláň, the incumbent Rector sought reelection.
- Jaroslav Miller, Head at Department of History at the Faculty of Arts. He announced his candidacy on 24 April 2013.

== Voting ==
Round	Jaroslav Miller	Miroslav Mašláň
1st round	15	9

== Aftermath ==
Miller was appointed by president on 1 February 2014.
