= Šumperk =

Town in Olomouc Region, Czech Republic

- Town
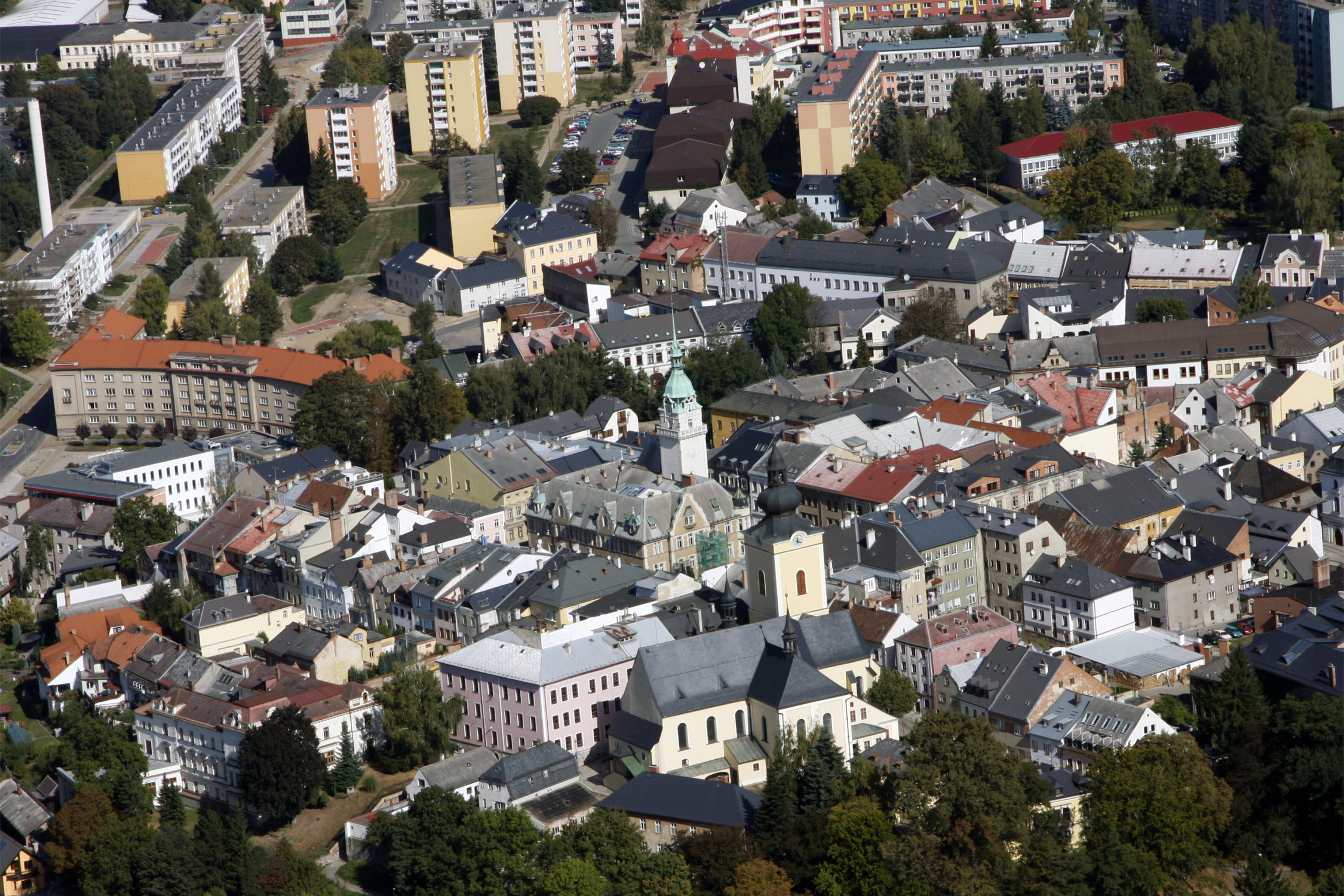
- Aerial view of Šumperk

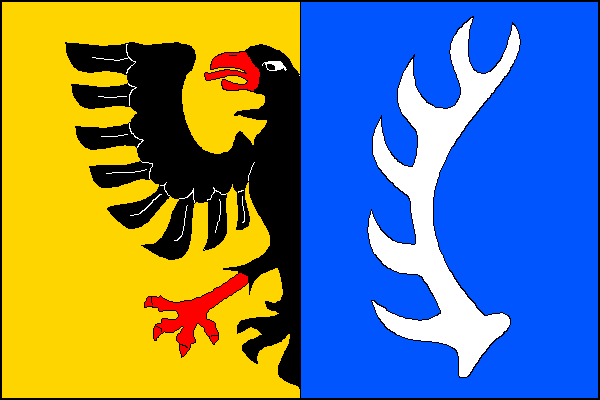
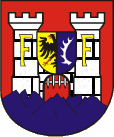
- Flag Coat of arms

- Location in the Czech Republic
- Coordinates: 49°57′55″N 16°58′14″E
- Country: Czech Republic
- Region: Olomouc
- District: Šumperk
- First mentioned: 1281

Government
  - Mayor: Martin Kuchtík (Nezávislá volba)

Area
  - Total: 27.88 km^{2} (10.76 sq mi)
- Elevation: 315 m (1,033 ft)

Population (2026-01-01)
  - Total: 24,444
  - Density: 876.8/km^{2} (2,271/sq mi)
- Time zone: UTC+1 (CET)
  - Summer (DST): UTC+2 (CEST)
- Postal code: 787 01
- Website: www.sumperk.cz

Šumperk (Czech pronunciation: [ˈʃumpɛrk]; German: Mährisch Schönberg) is a town in the Olomouc Region of the Czech Republic. It has about 24,000 inhabitants. The town is located in the Hanušovice Highlands on the stream Bratrušovský potok.

Šumperk is an industrial town, but it also contains valuable historical and architectural monuments. The historic town centre is well preserved and is protected as an urban monument zone.

== Etymology ==
The original German name is derived from Schön Berg, meaning "beautiful hill", which later supplemented by a distinguishing adjective Mährisch (i.e. Moravian). The Czech name Šumperk evolved from a direct phonetic transcription.

After World War II and the expulsion of Germans, there was a suggestion of giving the town a name with Czech origins. Suggestions included approximate translations such as Krásná Hora, Krásov or Krásno nad Děsnou, and names unrelated to the original name, such as Svobodov, Velenov, Lnářov and Přadlenov. In the end the name of Šumperk remained unchanged.

== Geography ==
Šumperk is located about 45 kilometres (28 mi) north of Olomouc. It lies entirely in the Hanušovice Highlands, but for its proximity to the Hrubý Jeseník mountains, the town is sometimes nicknamed "The Gate to Jeseník." The highest point of the municipal territory is the hill Ohařův kámen with at 689 m (2,260 ft) above sea level.

Šumperk is located on the stream Bratrušovský potok. It is a tributary of the Desná River, which forms the southern municipal border.

== History ==
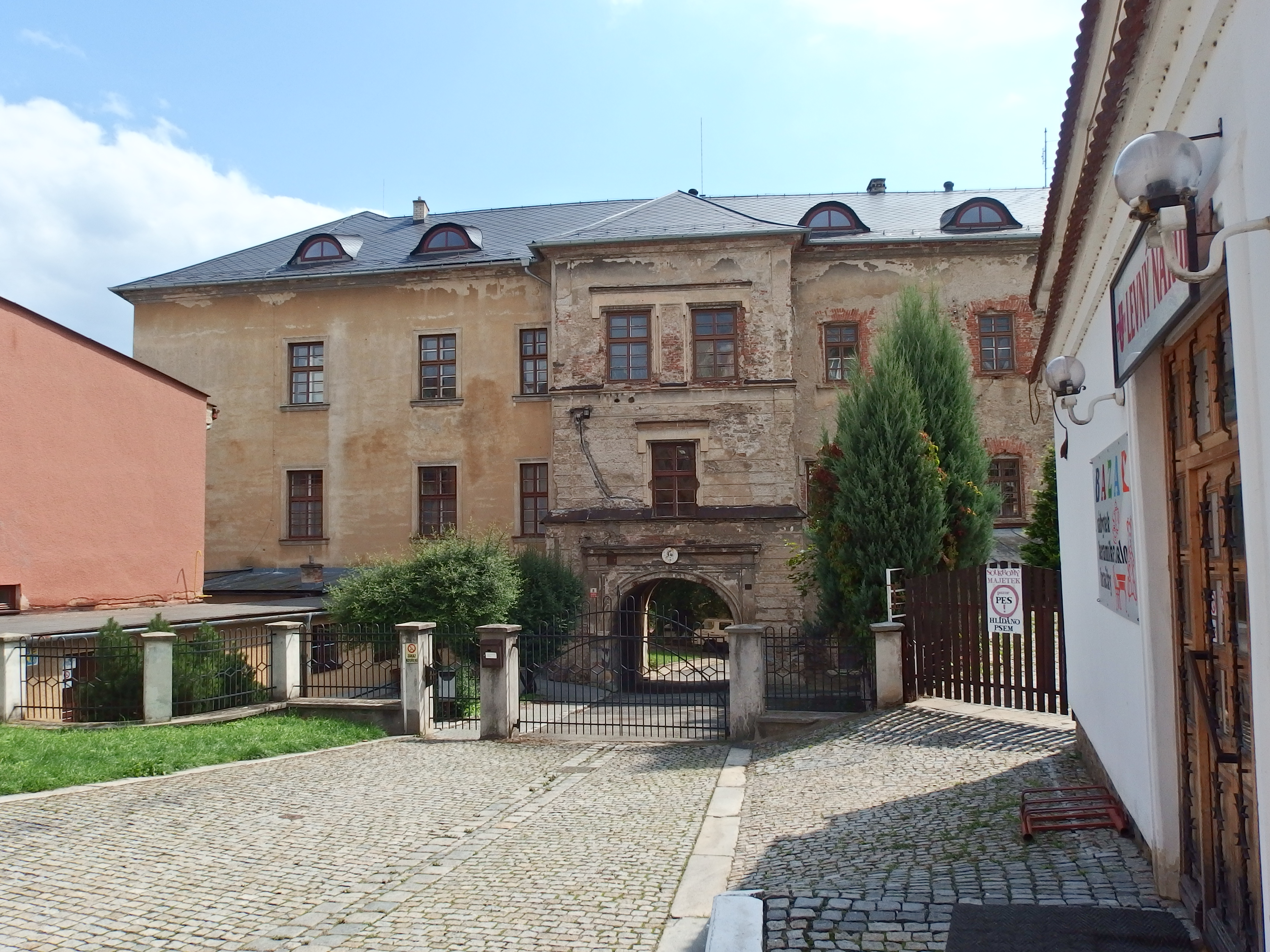
Šumperk Castle, today a secondary school

=== 13th–16th centuries ===
Šumperk was probably established by German settlers from Silesia in the second half of the 13th century. The town rapidly became prosperous due to rich deposits of precious metals. Šumperk belonged to the Margrave of Moravia. The first written mention of Šumperk is from 1281. This document refers to Jeneč of Šumperk, a town administrator who lived in a small fort on the outskirts. The fort has not been preserved. A Dominican monastery was founded in 1297.

Šumperk was sold to the Lords of Lipá by Margrave Charles in 1340. Šumperk was regained by the Margrave of Moravia in 1352. In 1391, Jobst of Moravia granted Magdeburg rights for Šumperk including "The Mile Right", guaranteeing a production and trade monopoly for the inhabitants of the town up to a distance of 1 German mile (7.5 km (4.7 mi)) from town gates. Šumperk inhabitants were also granted permission for brewing.

In 1490, Šumperk was the location of a meeting of Bohemian and Moravian provincial diet members, at which they came to an agreement about Vladislaus II's candidature for Bohemian throne. In 1496, Šumperk was bought by the Zierotin family.

=== 16th–17th centuries ===
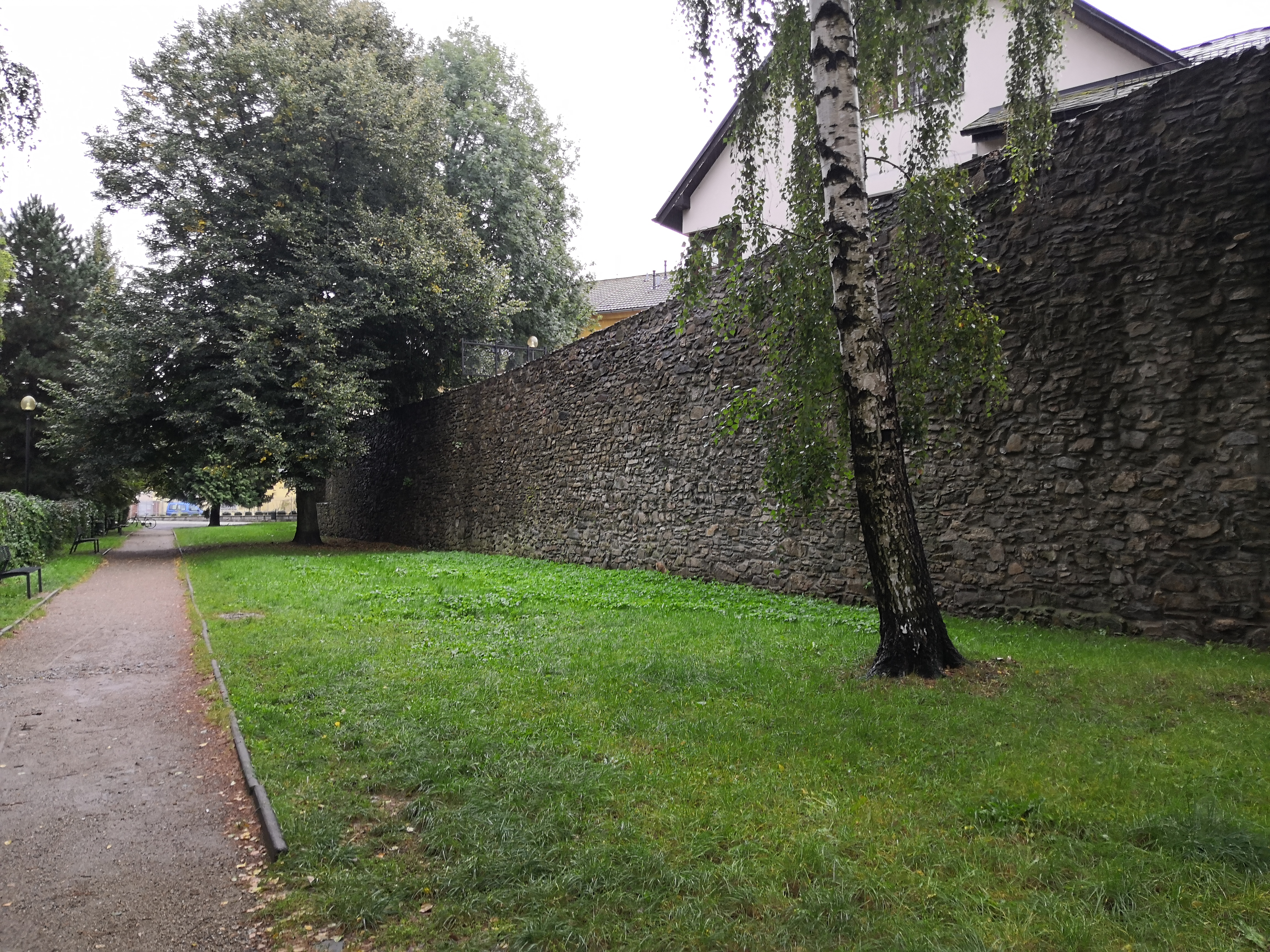
Remains of the town walls

The Zierotins became permanent owners of Šumperk in 1507. Petr of Zierotin chose Šumperk Castle as his family seat and has built the town walls. In the relatively peaceful 16th century, the town became prosperous, mainly due to the textile craft. The prosperity enabled the town to buy itself out of serfdom, and it became directly subordinate to the Bohemian king in 1562. During the second half of the 16th century, the town was hit by three plague epidemics and devastating floods.

In 1622, Šumperk lost its privileges for participating in the Bohemian Revolt and was acquired by the House of Lichtenstein, who owned the town until the fall of the feudal system in 1848. At the end Thirty Years' War, between 1642 and 1646, the town was conquered and looted several times by Swedish army. In 1669, Šumperk was hit by a large fire, which destroyed the entire town. By the end of the 17th century, the town was rebuilt in ruins.

Between 1679 and 1693, 25 people from Šumperk were killed in witch trials.

=== 18th–19th centuries ===
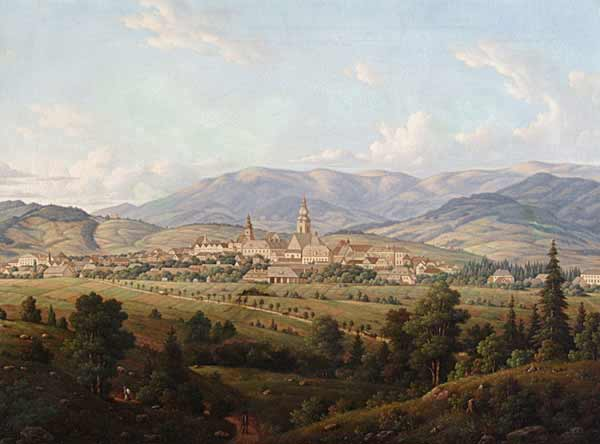
A View of Šumperk, painting by N. Malizius from 1864

Vienna industrialist Johann Ernst Klapperoth established a factory producing corduroy in 1785, the first of its kind in the Habsburg monarchy. The number of factories in the town rose gradually through the 19th century, when large linen and textile factories were established. A flax spinning mill was opened in 1842. During the 19th century, Šumperk became the Moravian centre for the industrial production of linen and silk.

Other local businesses included a brewery (opened 1861), a foundry (opened 1868), a factory producing earthenware (opened 1868), a mineral oil refinery (opened 1871), a textile machine factory (opened 1898), a factory producing iron goods (opened 1903), three large sawmills (in 1905), three brickworks (in 1905), two factories producing flying shuttles and bobbins (in 1905). Other businesses operating in the early 20th century were two leather factories, a factory processing fats, a cardboard factory, a slaughterhouse, a power plant and gasworks.

In 1871, a railway line between Šumperk and Zábřeh was completed.

In the second half of the 19th century, due to the development of industry and economic prosperity, the urban and architectural face of the town changed significantly, and important Viennese architects were invited to build villas and other buildings. For its approach to the appearance of Vienna, Šumperk was sometimes nicknamed "Little Vienna".

=== 20th century ===
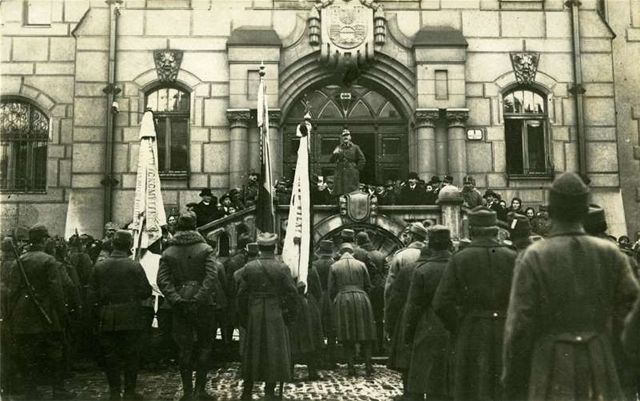
Czechoslovak soldiers occupy Šumperk in December 1918, photo taken the front of town hall

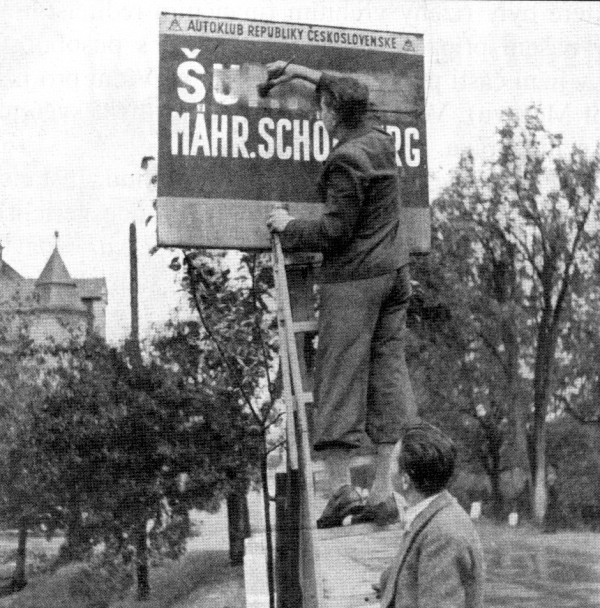
Sudeten German removes Czech name in 1938

Sudeten Germans on the Imperial Austro-Hungarian Council declared sovereignty for German-inhabited Moravia, including Šumperk, under the name Sudetenland of the Republic of German-Austria. Czechs did not accept the division and, following the idea of the Bohemian state rights, declared that all of Bohemia and Moravia be included the establishing Czechoslovak state.

One of the German rebels was the mayor of Šumperk, Gustav Oberleithner, who became vice-prime minister. On 7 November, Czech envoys demanded surrender of Šumperk's German self-government. Establishing facts on the grounds, Czechoslovak troops invaded the German-speaking areas. On 15 December 1918, Šumperk surrendered at the threat of shots to be fired to the town.

After the Munich Agreement in 1938, Šumperk was occupied by the Wehrmacht, and was attached to Nazi Germany as part of Reichsgau Sudetenland. The last Czech families moved inland. The occupation and the World War II halted the economic prosperity and brought great casualties.

After the World War II, the German inhabitants of the town were expelled. Šumperk was rapidly repopulated, especially by Czechs from inland. On 21 August 1968, Šumperk was occupied by the Polish People's Army, which was replaced by the Red Army on 3 October 1968. Jan Zajíc, a student of the Šumperk Industrial School, committed suicide by self-immolation as a political protest against Soviet occupation, following Jan Palach.

== Demographics ==
Historical population

Year	Pop.	±%
1869	9,651	—
1880	10,983	+13.8%
1890	13,331	+21.4%
1900	14,658	+10.0%
1910	16,448	+12.2%

Year	Pop.	±%
1921	16,006	−2.7%
1930	18,739	+17.1%
1950	17,192	−8.3%
1961	19,266	+12.1%
1970	23,683	+22.9%

Year	Pop.	±%
1980	28,108	+18.7%
1991	30,422	+8.2%
2001	29,490	−3.1%
2011	26,737	−9.3%
2021	25,182	−5.8%

Source: Censuses

== Economy ==
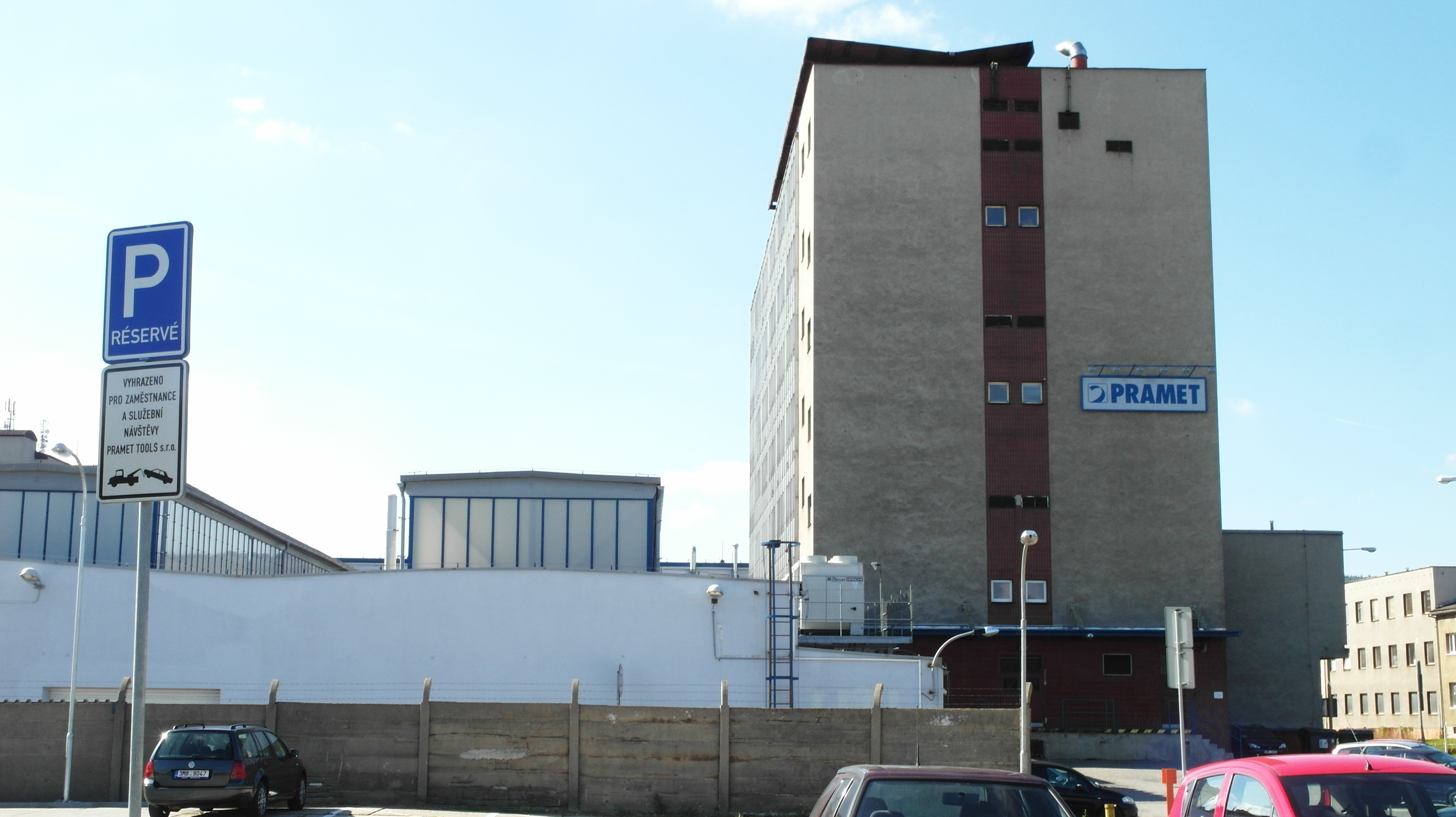
Pramet factory

Šumperk was a significant centre of the textile industry throughout the Austria-Hungary, interwar and Communist eras. Thanks to factories focusing on the production of natural and synthetic silk, Šumperk has become a European centre of silk industry. Communist rule nationalised every company in Šumperk and united them into a large national company named Hedva. The silk production in Hedva ended in 1998 and only thread production continued. However, in 2019, this production ended as well and that meant the end of textile industry tradition in the town.

Today, Šumperk is still an industrial town, even though the focus has changed. The largest industrial employer is TDK Electronics, which produces ferrites for automotive purposes. The beginnings of production in Šumperk date back to 1956, when the ferrites were produced under Pramet brand. The second largest industrial company is Dormer Pramet, a manufacturer and supplier of cutting tools. It is a successor of the Pramet company, which was founded here in 1951.

A significant company is also Škoda Pars which renovates old trains and trams; its best known product is the RegioNova train.

The largest non-industrial employer is the Šumperk hospital.

== Transport ==
Šumperk is the terminus and start of the railway lines from/to Olomouc, further continuing to Brno or Vyškov.

== Culture ==
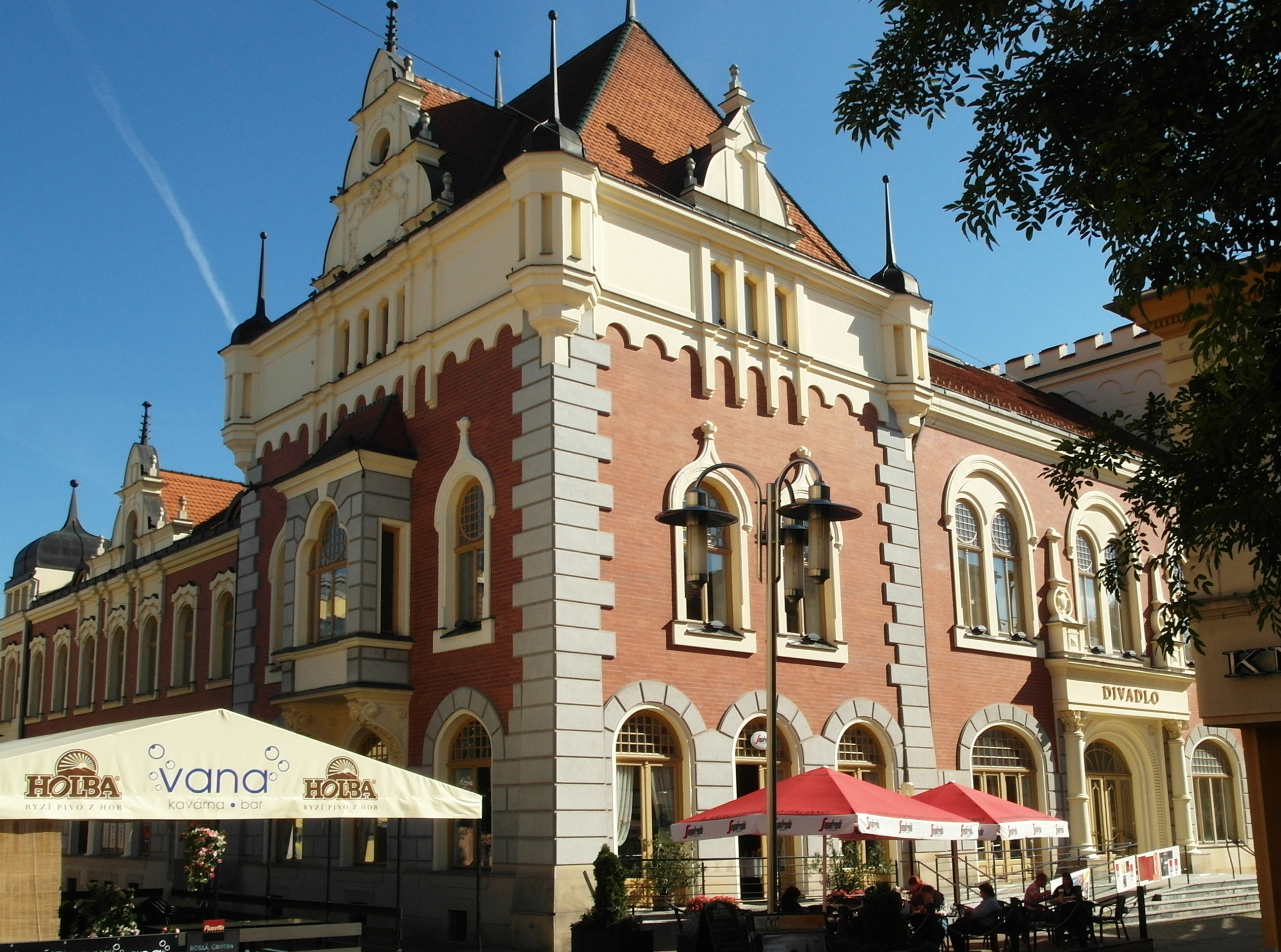
North Moravian Theatre

Cultural institutions located in Šumperk include a cinema, the North Moravian Theatre, or a regional museum. The main cultural facilities are the Šumperk Cultural Hall and the town's library.

Several festivals take place annually in the town:

- Blues Alive is the biggest international blues festival in Central Europe. It was established in 1996.
- Slavnosti města Šumperka ('Festival of the town of Šumperk') is a festival with a historical theme, a tradition since 1998.
- Město čte knihu ('The town reads a book') is a literary and film festival, which has been held annually since 2005. The purpose of the festival is to read a selected book by a selected author.
- Klášterní hudební slavnosti ('Monastery music festivities') is a series of classical music concerts during the summer. The festival was established in 2007.
- Divadlo v parku ('Theatre in park') is a theatre festival. The festival, organised by the local theatre, hosts professional ensembles from other towns and cities.
- International Folklore Festival is a parade of folk ensembles from all over the world that takes place every year in several places in the town.

== Sport ==
The town's ice hockey club Draci Šumperk plays in the third tier of the Czech ice hockey system, being relegated in the 2022/2023 season.

FK Šumperk is the town's football club, playing in the fourth tier of the Czech football system.

== Sights ==
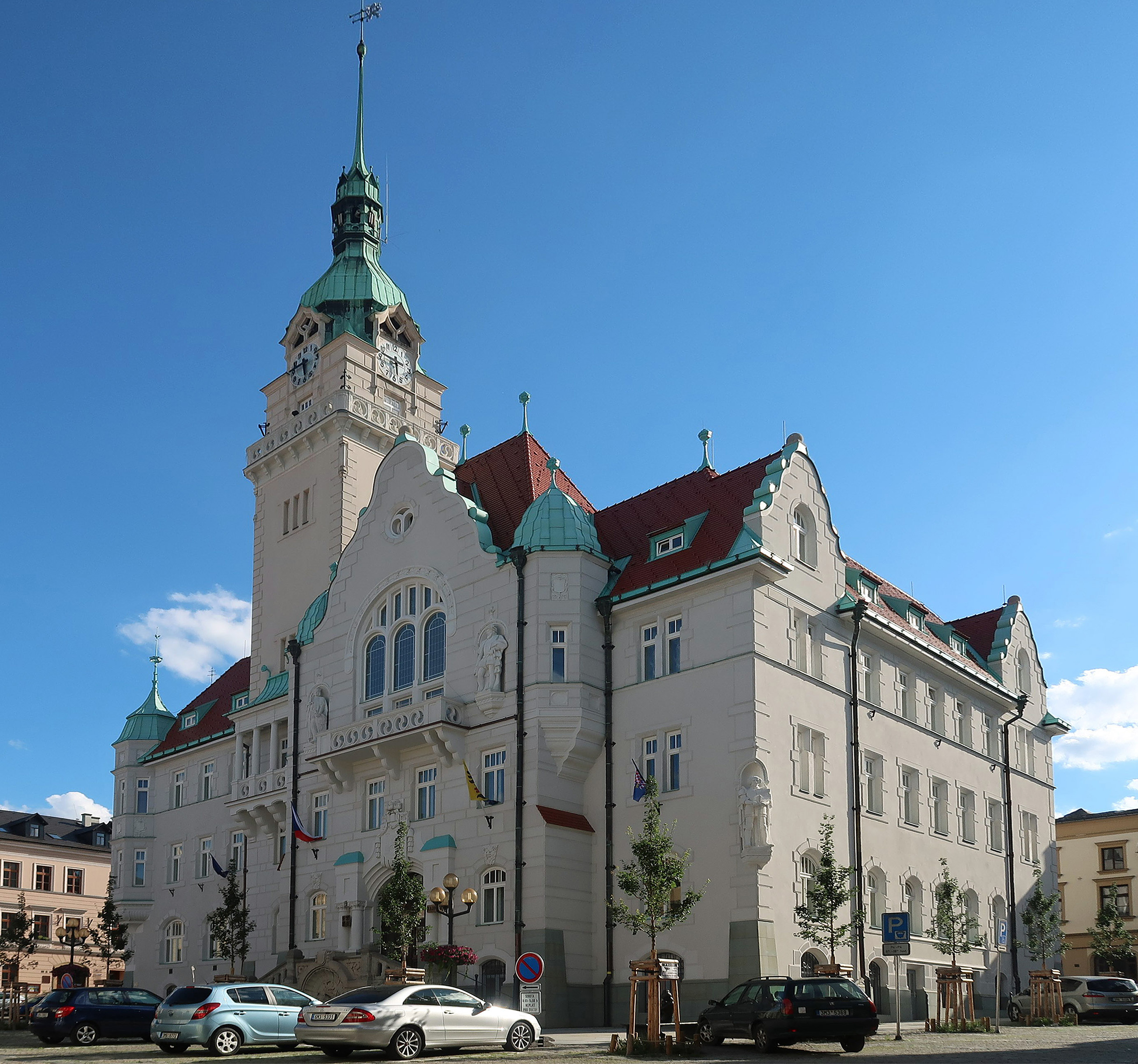
Town hall

In the second half of the 19th century and first half of the 20th century, many architectural gems were created in the town, first especially in the Neoclassical and Neo-Renaissance styles, later in the Functionalist style. Notable is the town hall which is a landmark of the town centre. It was built in the Saxon Neo-Renaissance style in 1909–1911, and replaced an old Gothic town hall first mentioned in 1475.

Pavlínin dvůr is a former manor house, rebuilt into a Neo-Renaissance residence in 1876. Today the building serves as the regional museum. It is located in a large town park Sady 1. května, which was created from the ornamental garden of the residence. Other significant buildings are the library that was built in 1893–1894 and rebuilt in 1928, Neoclassical former German grammar school from 1897, or the Neo-romantic theatre building from 1901 to 1902.

Valuable functionalistic buildings include Hotel Grand built in 1931–1932 and Ottokar Katzer's house from 1930.

The former Church of the Annunciation is a remnant of Dominican monastery, which was abolished in 1784. After the fire in 1784 it was rebuilt in the Baroque style. Today this valuable historic monument serves cultural and social purposes. The monastery building serves as the seat of a secondary medical school.

Geschader's House, today known as House of the European Meeting, is one of the oldest houses in Šumperk. In its Gothic cellar is a permanent exhibition on the witch trials in the region.

Other sights in Šumperk include Church of Saint John the Baptist, Church of Saint Barbara, and fragments of the town walls.

== Notable people ==
- Leo Slezak (1873–1946), tenor singer
- Gertrude Pitzinger (1904–1997), German opera singer
- Roman Karl Scholz (1912–1944), Austrian writer and resistance fighter
- Radoslav Nenadál (1929–2018), writer and translator
- Gerda Frömel (1931–1975), Irish-German sculptor
- Hans Klein (1931–1996), German politician
- Eugen Brixel (1939–2000), Austrian composer and musician
- Miroslav Krobot (born 1951), actor and theatre director
- Miroslav Tulis (born 1951), athlete
- Jan Balabán (1961–2010), writer, journalist and translator
- Ivana Kubešová (born 1962), middle-distance runner
- Jaroslav Mostecký (born 1963), author
- Jiří Dopita (born 1968), ice hockey player
- Jaroslav Miller (born 1971), professor of history and rector
- Ondřej Sokol (born 1971), director, actor and translator
- Simona Babčáková (born 1973), actress
- Aleš Valenta (born 1973), freestyle skier, Olympic winner
- Alena Kupčíková (born 1976), contemporary artist
- Radoslav Kováč (born 1979), football player and manager
- Ivana Večeřová (born 1979), basketball player
- Jan Hudec (born 1981), Czech-Canadian skier
- Jakub Kindl (born 1987), ice hockey player

== Twin towns – sister cities ==
Šumperk is twinned with:

- Bad Hersfeld, Germany
- Ebreichsdorf, Austria
- Maarssen, Netherlands
- Mikulov, Czech Republic
- Nysa, Poland
- Prievidza, Slovakia
- Sulmona, Italy
- Vaasa, Finland

== Gallery ==
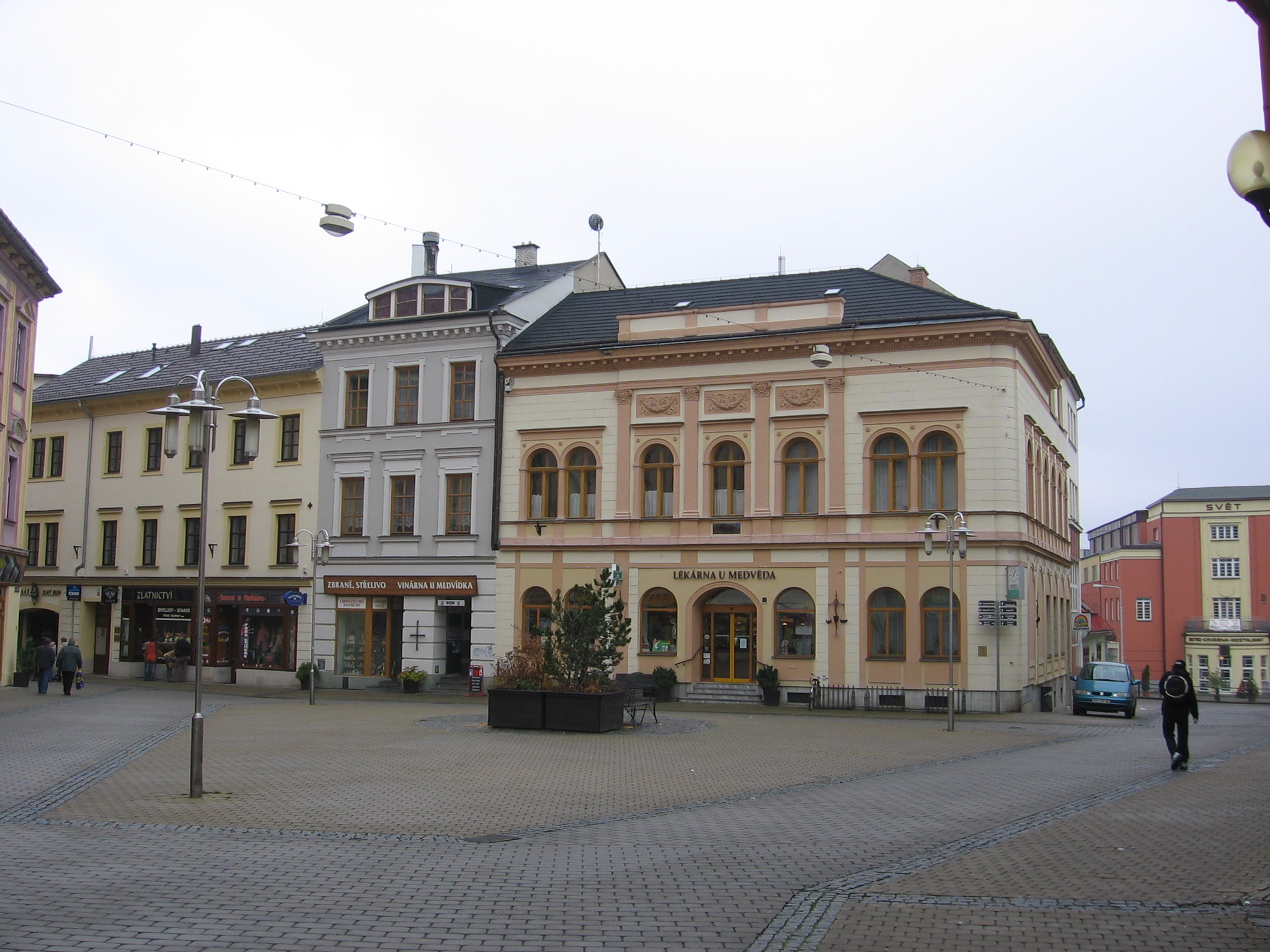
Part of Hlavní třída Street

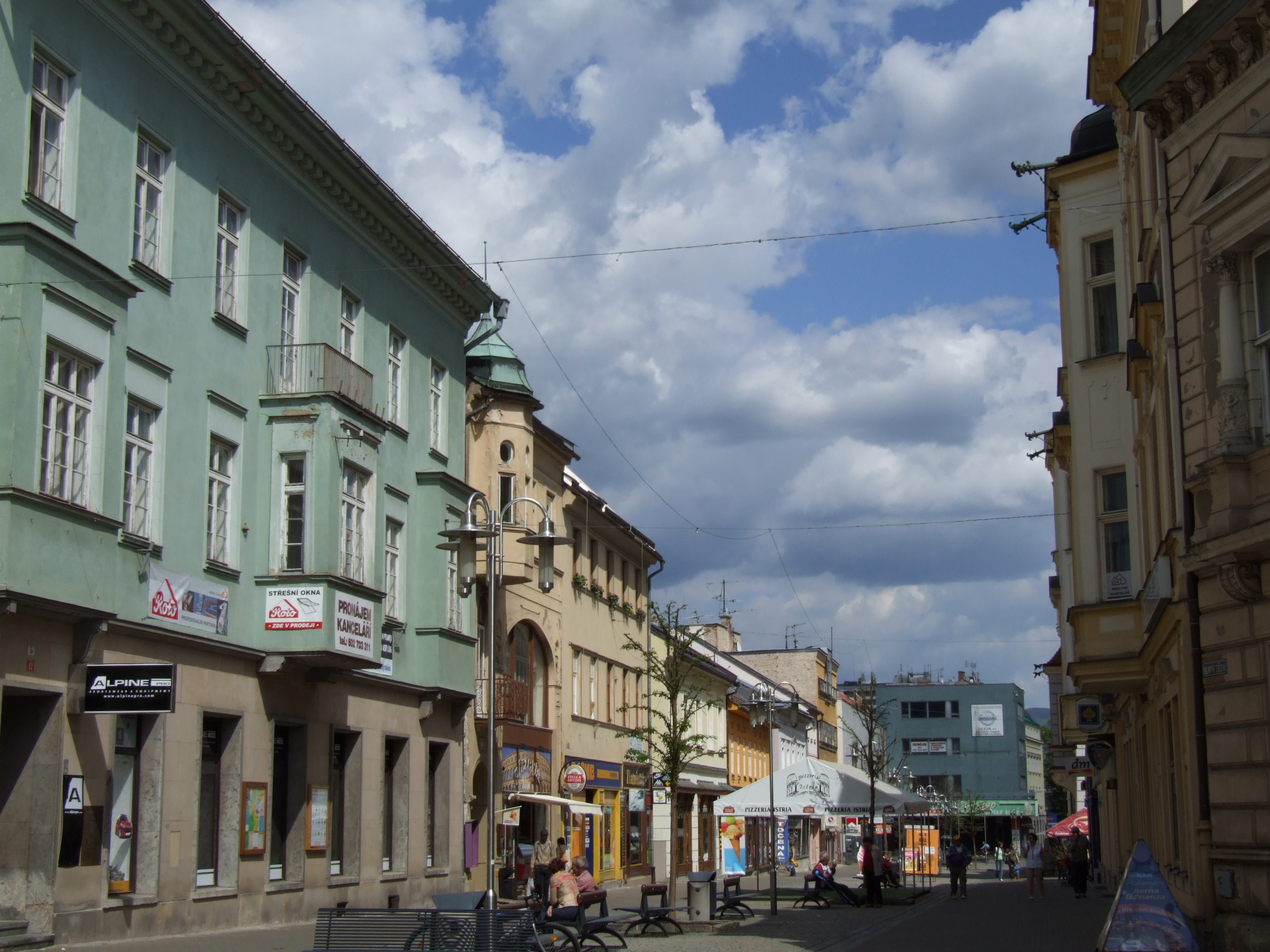
Part of Hlavní třída Street

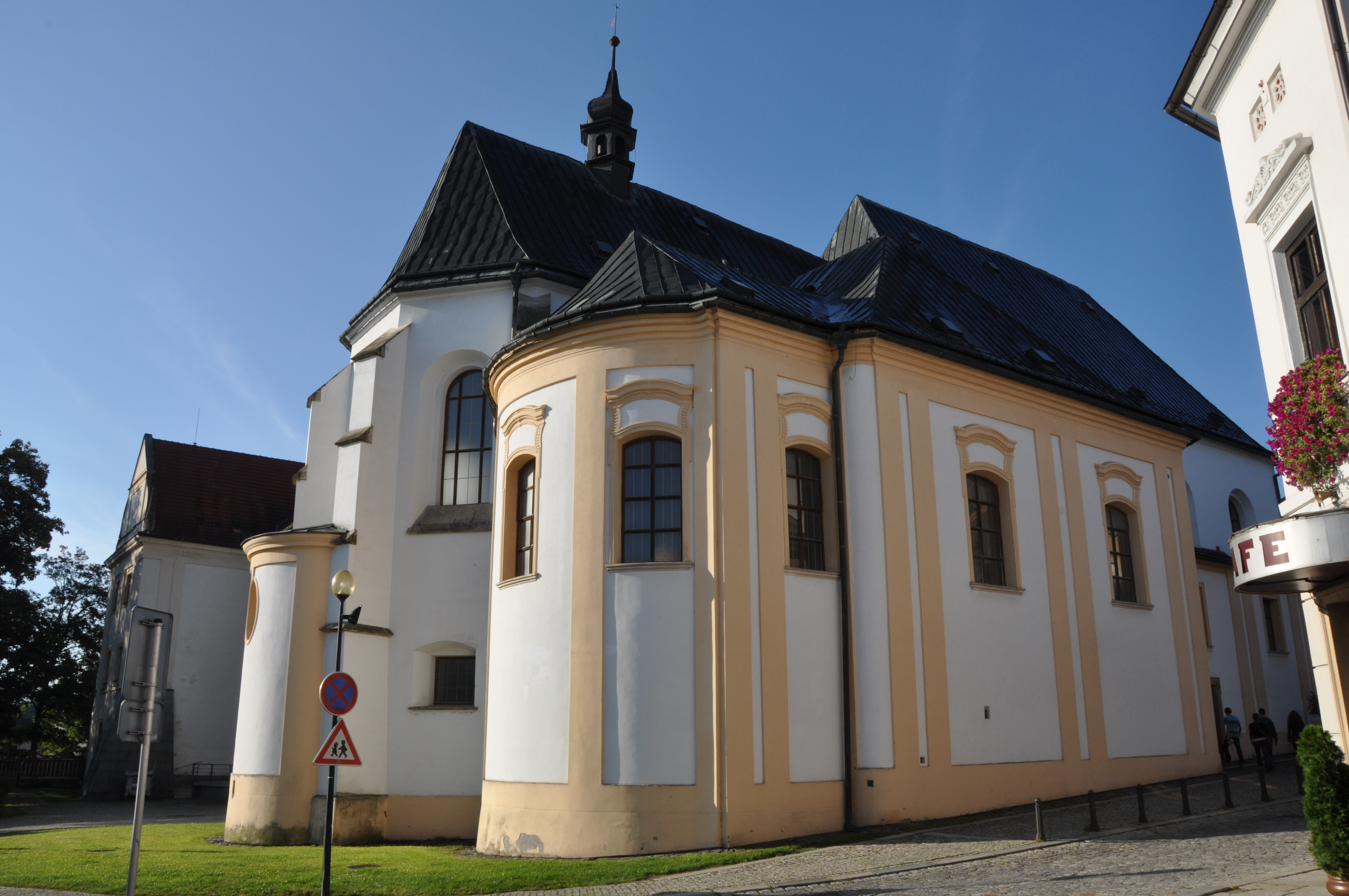
Former Church of the Annunciation

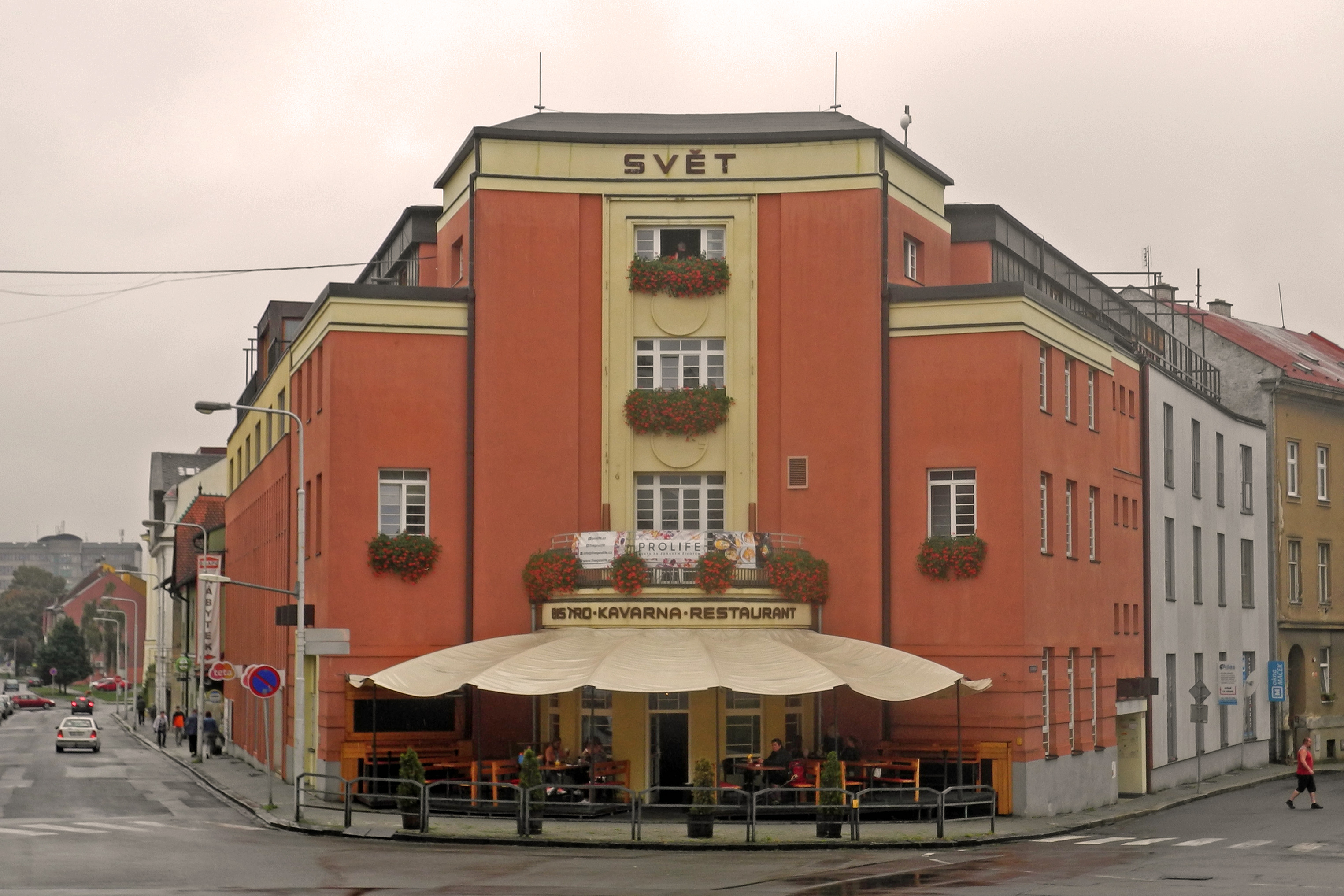
Former Svět Cinema

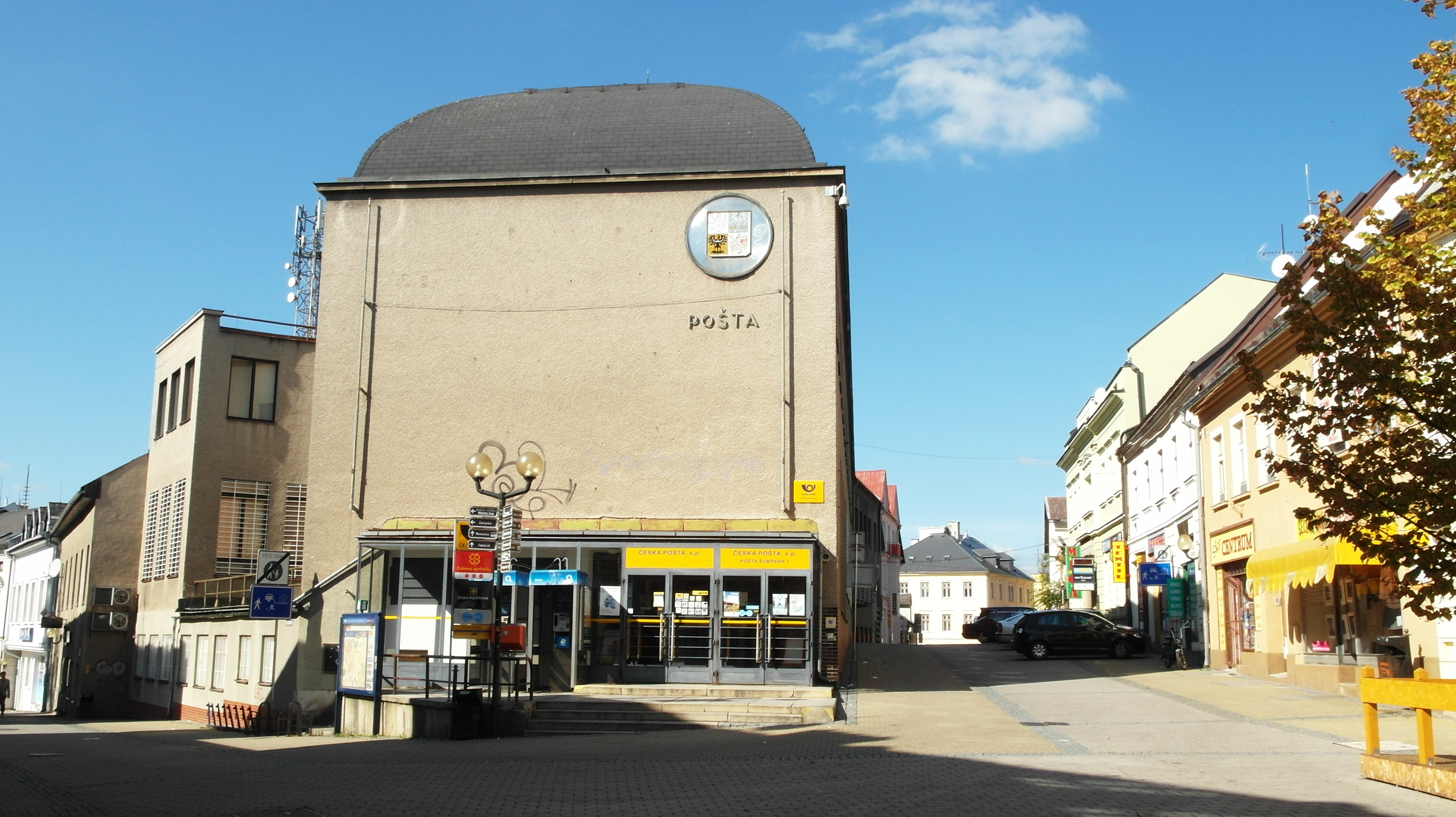
Functionalist post office

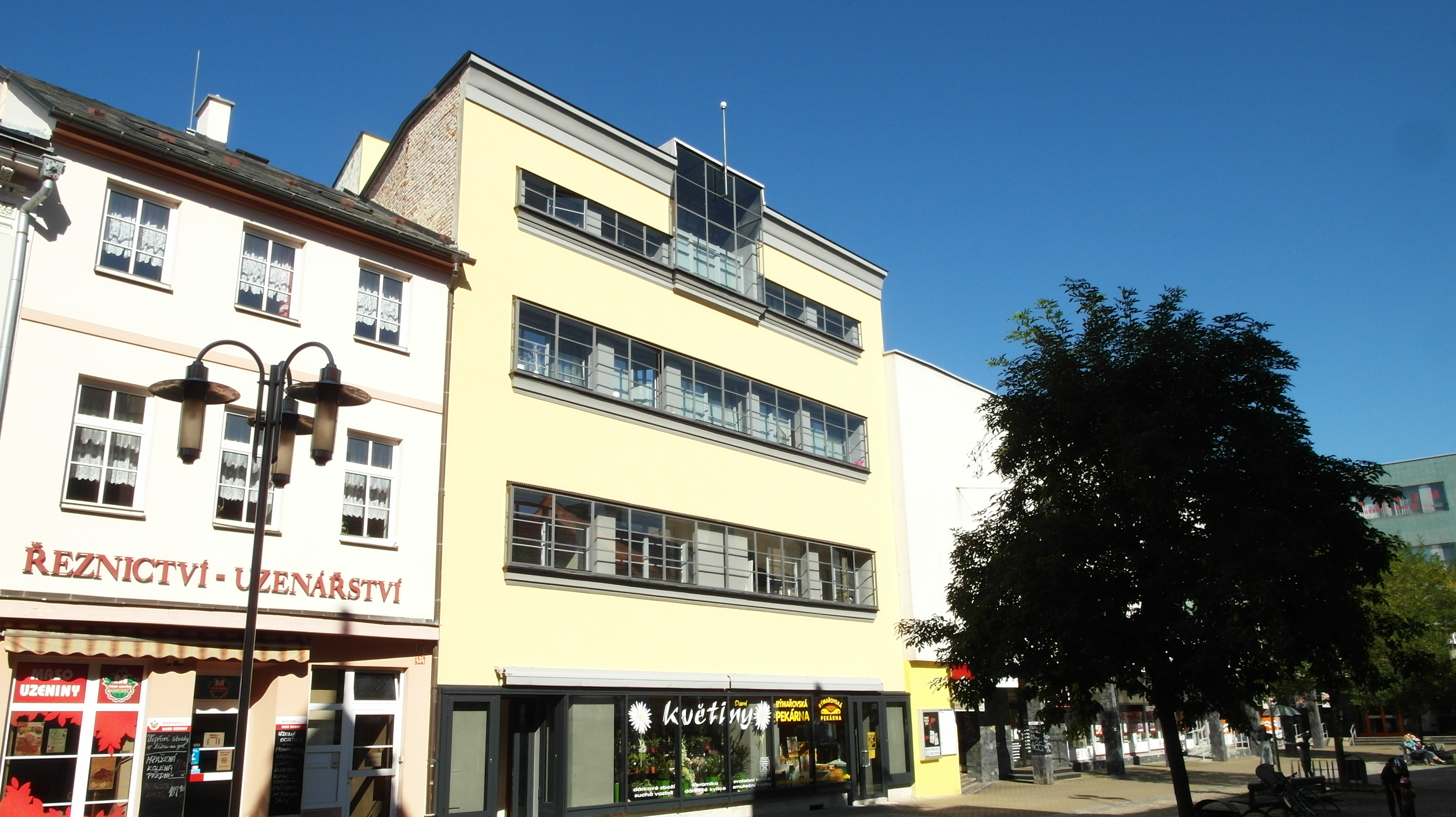
Functionalist resident and commercial house
