= Zábřeh =

- Town
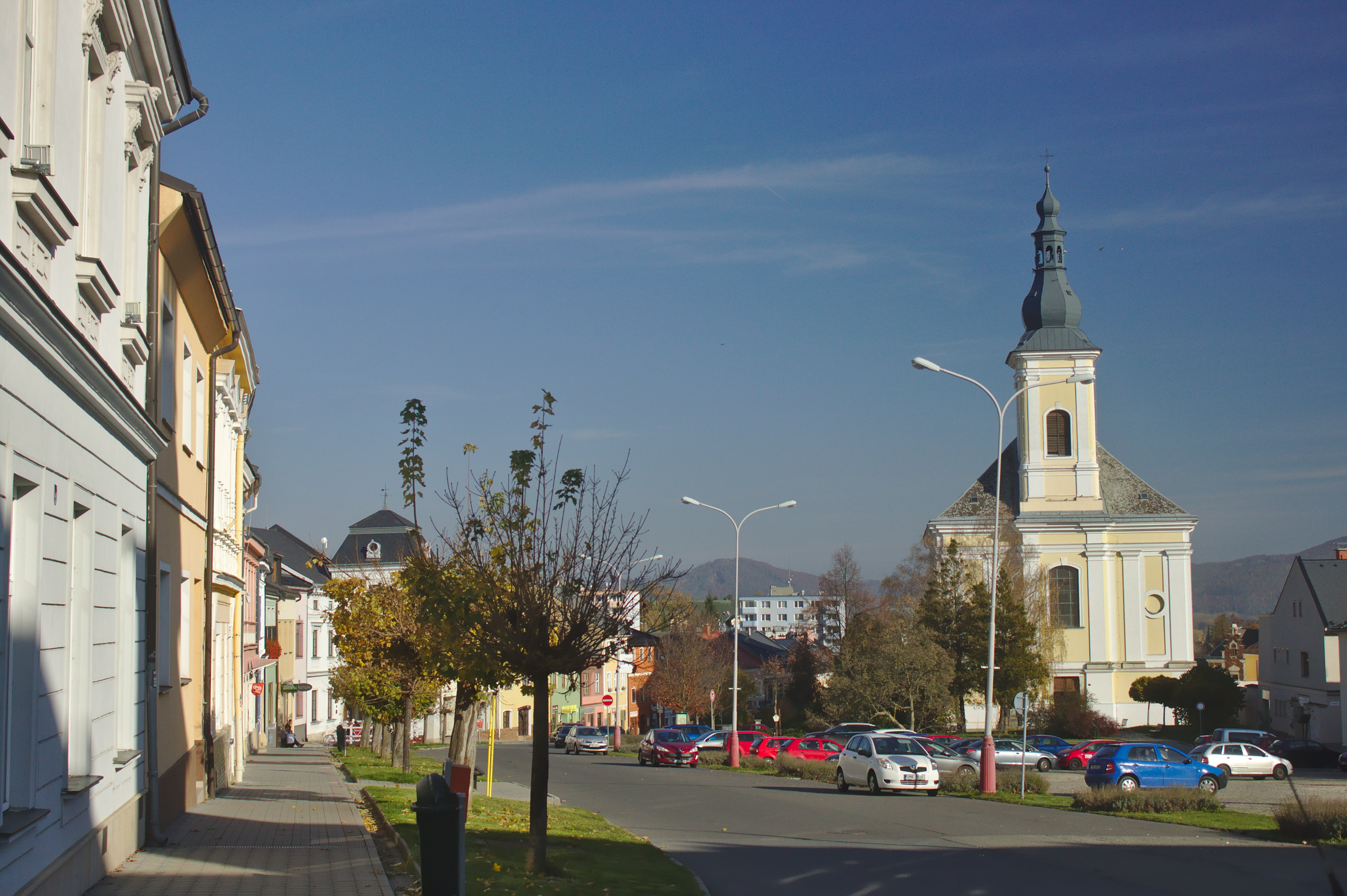
- Town square with the Church of Saint Bartholomew

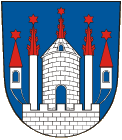
- Flag Coat of arms

- Location in the Czech Republic
- Coordinates: 49°52′57″N 16°52′20″E
- Country: Czech Republic
- Region: Olomouc
- District: Šumperk
- First mentioned: 1254

Government
  - Mayor: František John (KDU-ČSL)

Area
  - Total: 34.59 km^{2} (13.36 sq mi)
- Elevation: 285 m (935 ft)

Population (2026-01-01)
  - Total: 13,157
  - Density: 380.4/km^{2} (985.2/sq mi)
- Time zone: UTC+1 (CET)
  - Summer (DST): UTC+2 (CEST)
- Postal code: 789 01
- Website: www.zabreh.cz

Zábřeh (Czech pronunciation: [ˈzaːbr̝ɛx]; German: Hohenstadt) is a town in Šumperk District in the Olomouc Region of the Czech Republic. It has about 13,000 inhabitants. The town is situated on the Moravská Sázava River, on the border between the Mohelnice Depression and Zábřeh Highlands.

Among the most important owners of the town in its feudal history were the Tunkl of Brníčko and Liechtenstein families. The historic character of the town was destroyed by a fire at the end of the 18th century. The town became an industrial centre in the 19th century, but today no large industrial companies are based here.

== Administrative division ==
Zábřeh consists of five municipal parts (in brackets population according to the 2021 census):

- Zábřeh (12,982)
- Dolní Bušínov (37)
- Hněvkov (203)
- Pivonín (66)
- Václavov (191)

Dolní Bušínov and Hněvkov form two exclaves of the municipal territory.

== Etymology ==
The name Zábřeh is derived from za břehem, meaning 'behind the riverbank'. It is a reference to the river which flows through the town. The former German name Hohenstadt means 'high town'.

== Geography ==
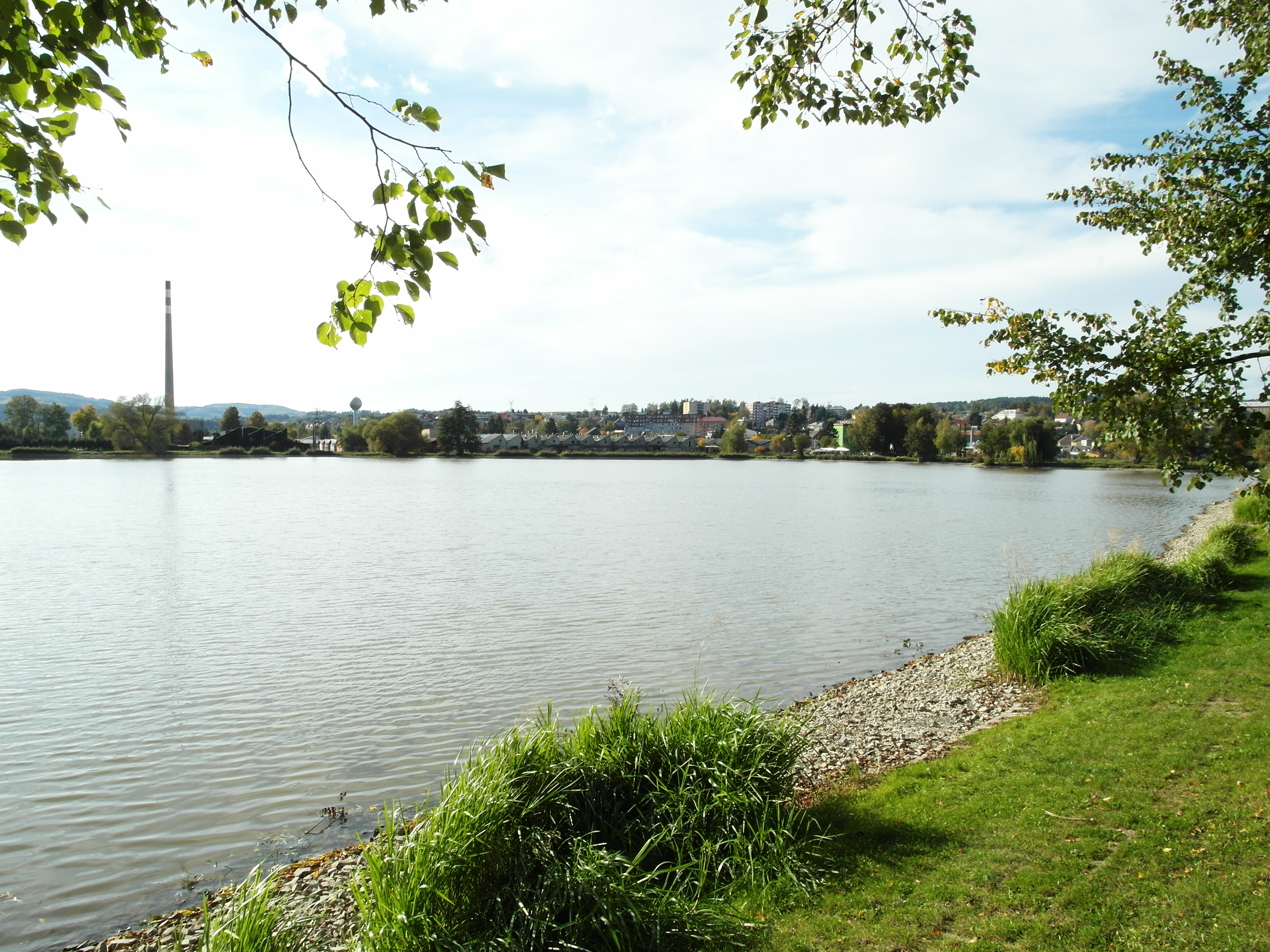
Oborník Pond with the abandoned textile factory in the background

Zábřeh is located about 11 kilometres (7 mi) southwest of Šumperk and 41 km (25 mi) northwest of Olomouc. The eastern half of the municipal territory lies in the Mohelnice Depression lowland and the second half lies on the hillside of the Zábřeh Highlands. The highest point is at 537 m (1,762 ft) above sea level. The Moravská Sázava River flows through the south of the town. Oborník pond is located in the built-up area.

== History ==
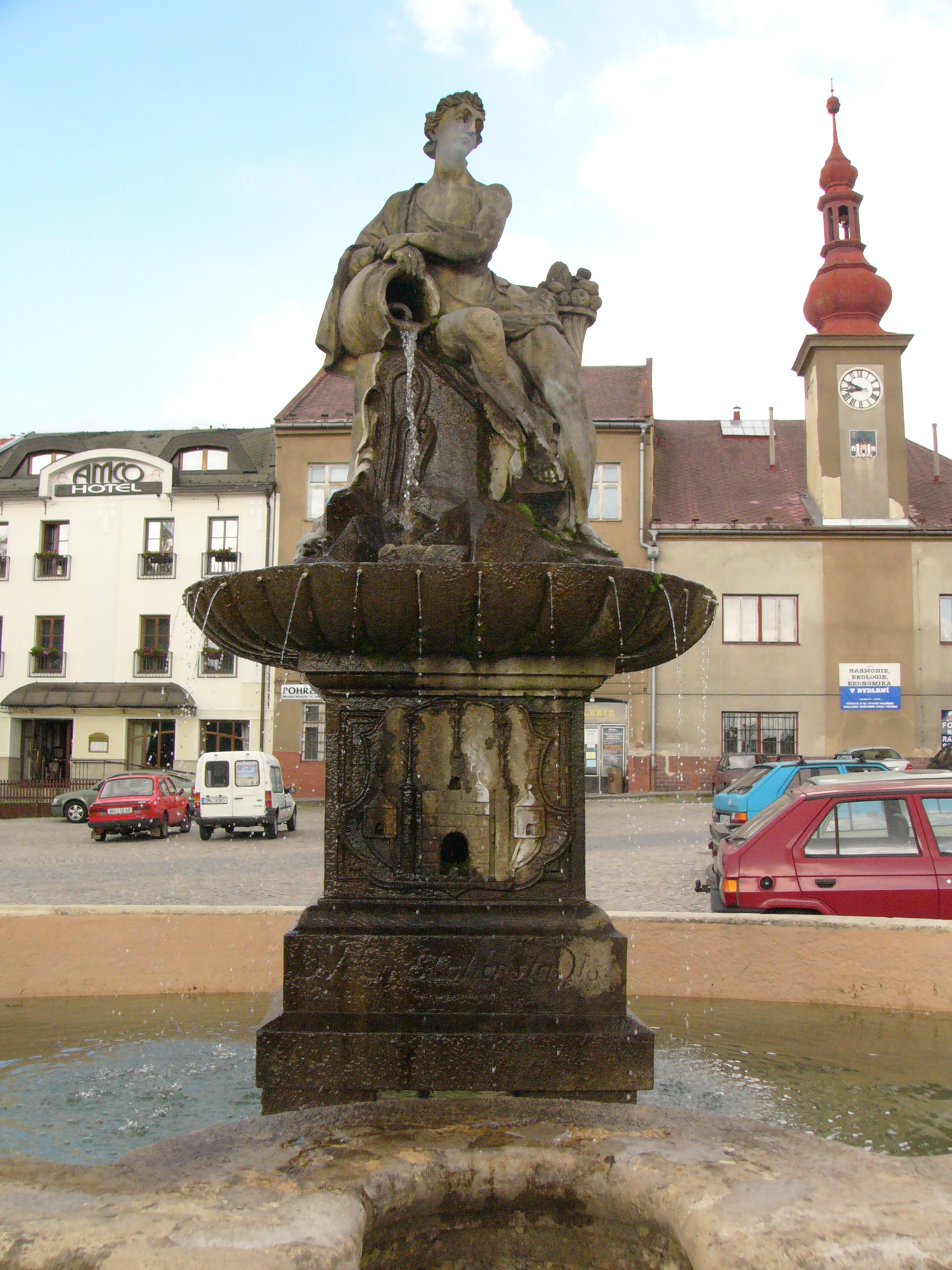
Fountain on the town square

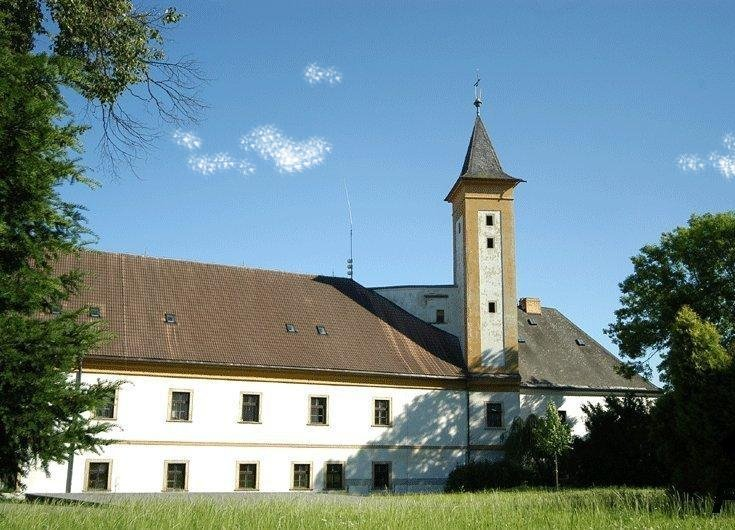
Zábřeh Castle

The first written mention of Zábřeh is from 1254. It was most likely a settlement that was intended to protect the ford. A fortress was probably founded here together with the settlement. In 1278, Zábřeh was first referred to as a town.

From the mid-14th century until 1392, the Zábřeh estate was held by the Moravian branch of the Sternberg family, then shortly by Jobst of Moravia, who donated it to lords of Kravaře in 1397. In the late 14th or early 15th century, the local fortress was rebuilt into a castle.

In 1442, Jiří od Kravaře sold Zábřeh to the Tunkl of Brníčko family, who became the most significant owners of the town. It was the only aristocratic family that ever had its seat at Zábřeh Castle. They made Zábřeh the centre of one of the largest estates in Moravia. They had expanded and rebuilt the castle in the late Gothic style and established ponds here, of which only one has survived. They were also known for conflicts with neighbouring families and vassals.

In 1508, Jindřich Tunkl was forced to sell the whole estate to Mikuláš Trčka of Lípa due to large debts. Trčka of Lípa traded the estate with the Boskovic family in 1512, In the 16th century, the significance of Zábřeh declined. The Zábřeh Castle was rebuilt in the Renaissance style in the 1560s and 1570s. The estate was inherited by the Zierotin family in 1589.

After the properties of the Zierotins were confiscated after the Battle of White Mountain, Zábřeh was acquired by the Liechtenstein family, who owned it from 1622 until 1848. The Thirty Years' War affected Zábřeh mainly from the economic point of view, and the town never managed to return to its previous economic and cultural significance. The castle was partially baroque modified in 1661, then the northern Baroque wing was added in 1727–1736. After the abolition of the lordship system, the Baroque wing of the castle was sold by Prince Aloys II of Liechtenstein to the town of Zábřeh.

After a devastating fire at the end of the 18th century, almost all the houses had to be rebuilt. In the first half 19th century, the Prague–Olomouc railway was built through the town, and thus the current appearance of the town was created. After the railway station was built after 1845, Zábřeh became an important commercial and industrial centre of the region.

Until 1918 Zábřeh was part of Austria-Hungary, head of the district with the same name, one of the 34 Bezirkshauptmannschaften in Moravia.

In 1938, the town was annexed by Nazi Germany and administered as part of the Reichsgau Sudetenland. Most Jews were killed during the Holocaust. The German speaking population was expelled in 1945 according to the Beneš decrees. Abandoned houses were taken over by Czechs from different parts of the country.

== Demographics ==
Zábřeh became a border town of the linguistic border between German and Czech. In 1880, the town's majority was German-speaking, but after the Czech's successful claim to the whole of Bohemia, the town's majority was Czech-speaking by 1930.

Historical population

Year	Pop.	±%
1869	5,790	—
1880	6,017	+3.9%
1890	6,599	+9.7%
1900	7,166	+8.6%
1910	7,918	+10.5%

Year	Pop.	±%
1921	8,078	+2.0%
1930	9,122	+12.9%
1950	8,449	−7.4%
1961	9,293	+10.0%
1970	11,420	+22.9%

Year	Pop.	±%
1980	14,253	+24.8%
1991	15,005	+5.3%
2001	14,561	−3.0%
2011	14,001	−3.8%
2021	13,479	−3.7%

Source: Censuses

== Economy ==
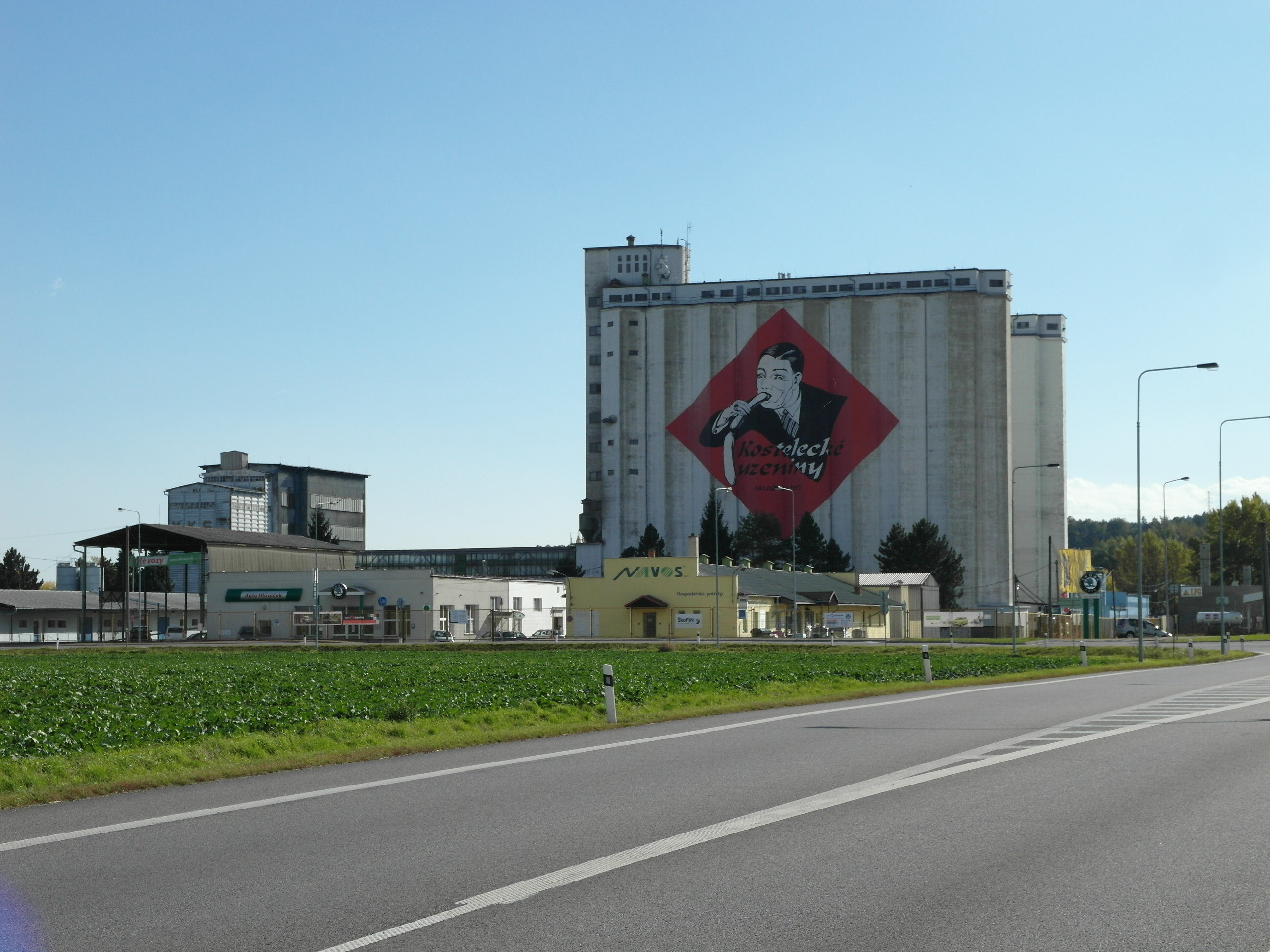
The silo on the outskirts

Zábřeh was historically a centre of textile industry profiting from its location next to the international railway. The large dyeing plant was founded here by the German industrialist Wilhelm Brass after 1870. After the World War II, the factory was nationalised and joined to the Perla national company. The textile production ended here in 2005.

Today, no major industrial companies are based in Zábřeh. The largest industrial company is HDO, which processes zinc alloy.

The Sulko factory produces plastic windows and doors. Part of the production is exported to west Europe. There is also a production plant of one of the largest Czech dairies, OLMA, owned by Agrofert. Fresh milk is processed here.

Zábřeh is situated in fertile lowland which is used for agricultural production. Maize, wheat, oilseed rape, poppy and fodder plant are grown. A tall silo is situated on the outskirts of the town.

== Transport ==
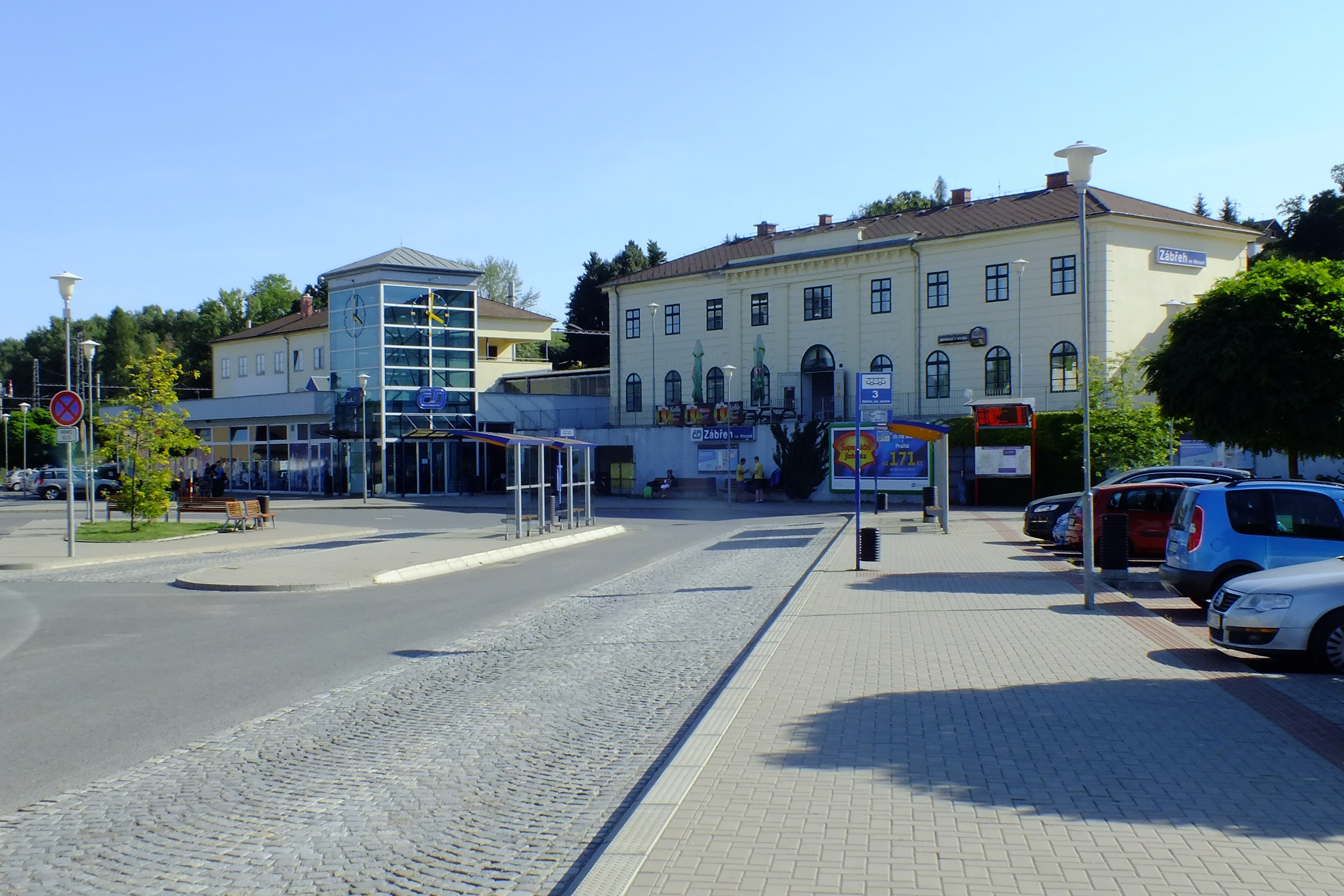
Zábřeh na Moravě railway station

The international railway corridor Prague–Zábřeh–Ostrava–Warsaw runs along the Moravská Sázava. The town's main railway station is named Zábřeh na Moravě (lit. 'Zábřeh in Moravia') to distinguish it from the eponymous station in Dolní Benešov. There is also a railway station of local significance, Zábřeh na Moravě zastávka.

== Culture ==
Zábřeh is located in the Haná ethnographic region.

== Sights ==
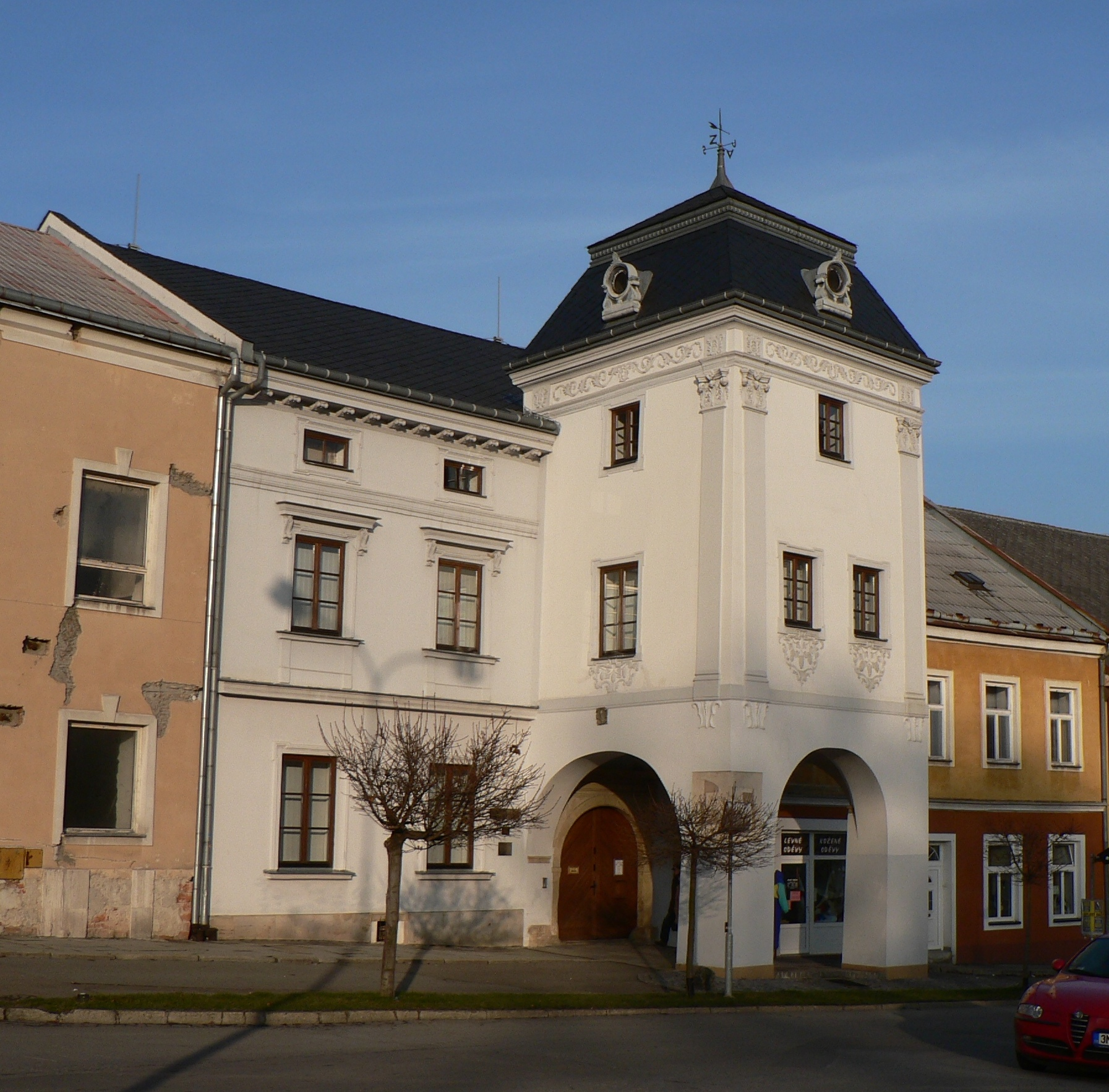
Zábřeh Museum

The main landmark of Zábřeh is the Zábřeh Castle. Since 1991, it has been used as the municipal office.

In the middle of the town square are a plague column from 1713 and a late Baroque fountain from 1829.

The parish Church of Saint Bartholomew was founded in the mid-13th century. Due to its poor condition it was demolished in 1750 and in 1754 the current baroque church was built in its site. The church tower houses a parish museum with displays of liturgical objects and a presentation on the history of bells. The second town's church, Church of Saint Barbara, was built in 1772.

The House Under The Arcades is one of the oldest houses in Zábřeh and one of the most valuable monuments. This Renaissance house from the 16th century was built on the site of two medieval houses, which were joined into one building. Today it houses the town museum.

== Notable people ==
- Josef Mik (1839–1900), entomologist
- Jan Eskymo Welzl (1868–1948), traveller, adventurer, gold-digger and writer
- Ctirad Kohoutek (1929–2011), composer
- Luboš Kohoutek (born 1935), astronomer
- Jaroslav Mostecký (born 1963), writer
- Jiří Valík (born 1966), athlete
- Ondřej Bank (born 1980), alpine skier
- Pavel Pumprla (born 1986), basketball player
- Emil Novák (born 1989), snowboarder
- Robin Wagner (born 1993), cyclist

== Twin towns – sister cities ==
Zábřeh is twinned with:

- Handlová, Slovakia
- Ochsenfurt, Germany
