= Jaroslav Mostecký =

Czech fantasy writer (1963–2020)

Jaroslav Mostecký (29 September 1963 in Zábřeh – 13 December 2020) was a Czech science fiction writer.

== Biography ==
He won the science fiction fandom related Karel Čapek prize in 1997.

Mostecký died from COVID-19 during the COVID-19 pandemic in the Czech Republic.
