= Tunkl of Brníčko family =

The Tunkl of Brníčko family, fully Tunkl of Brníčko and Zábřeh (Czech: Tunklové z Brníčka; German: Tunkl von Aschbrunn und Hohenstad, Latin: Tunkl de brniczko et in zabrzeh; also Tunkel/Tunckel, Dunkl/Dunkel) was a Moravian aristocratic family. The nobiliary particle is a reference to their major castle, called Brníčko and their manor at Zábřeh.

== Coat of arms ==
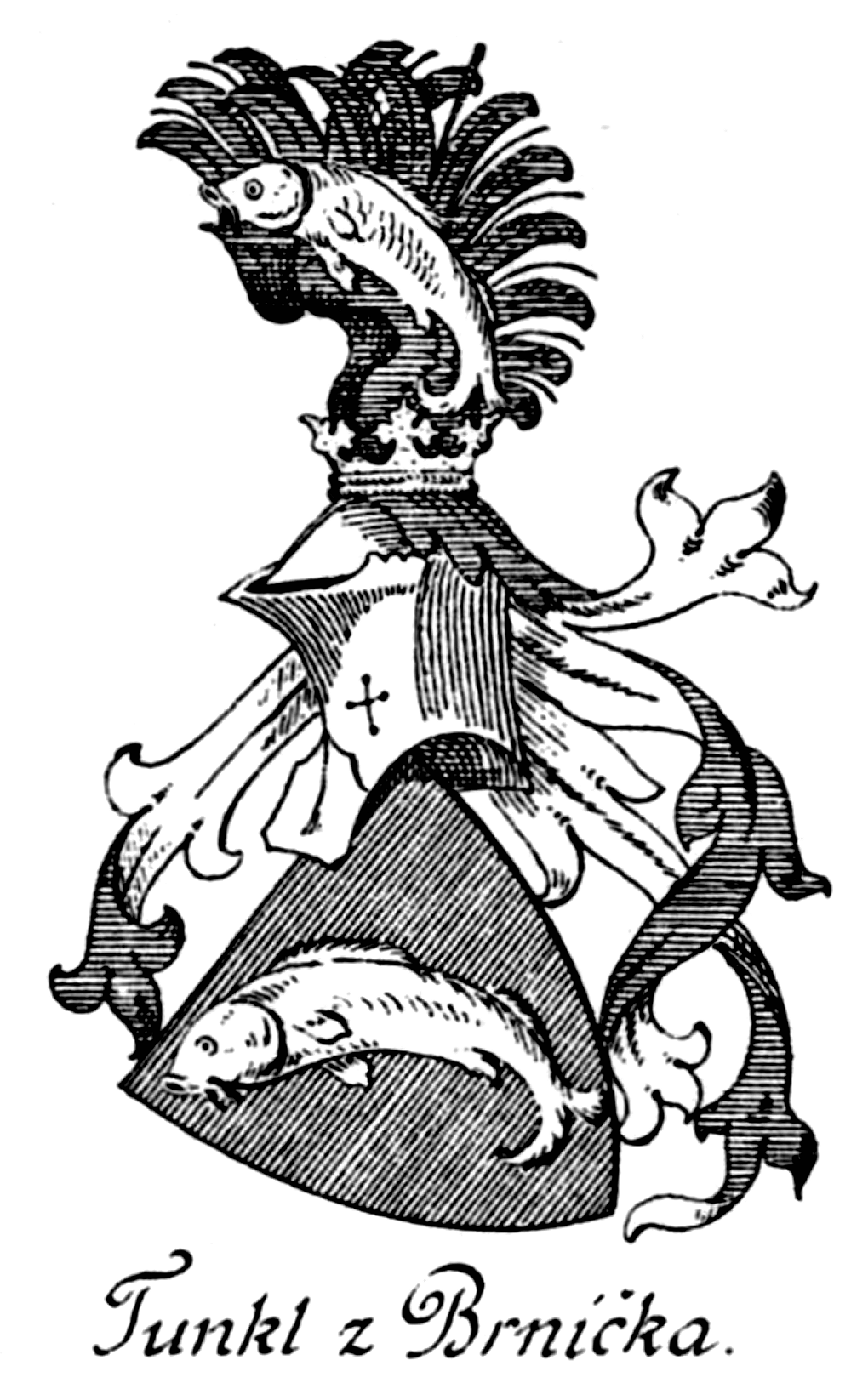
Coat of arms

The coat of arms is a fish, resembling a carp, decorated by a golden collar.

== History ==
Mikuláš Tunkl received Hranice town in 1380 from Jobst of Moravia. His son Jan the Elder Tunkl obtained the Brníčko castle and the Zábřeh manor. He also accompanied Frederick III, Holy Roman Emperor during his journey to Rome. Jiří Tunkl and Jan the Younger Tunkl helped the emperor escape from the besieged city of Vienna in 1426. Grateful for their actions, the emperor promoted the House of Tunkl to the status of korouhevní panstvo (knight banneret). This status allowed them to attend the provincial Diet of Moravian Margraviate and thus to participate in Moravian self-government.

During the Bohemian War (1468–1478), the Tunkl of Brníčko family supported George of Poděbrady and was defeated in the Battle of Zvole. After this fiasco, the house changed sides and fought for Matthias Corvinus in the Battle of Ivanovice ve Slezsku. Despite the fact that the house lost this battle, Matthias Corvinus recognized their willingness to collaborate and gave them several hereditary rights.

Jindřich Tunkl sold his inheritance and moved to Prague where he became the Burgrave of Prague Castle and the vogt of Lower Lusatia.

During the 16th century, the house became poor. Since then house members have served as state clerks or military officers.
