= Jan Šoupal =

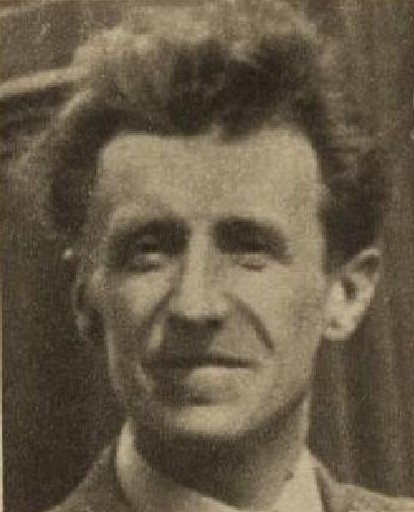
Jan Šoupal

Jan Šoupal (October 21, 1892 – November 25, 1964) was a Czech choirmaster, conductor and composer. He is notable particularly as arranger of folk songs for male choirs. Several music schools in Moravia are named in his honor.
