= Jarosław (given name) =

Polish masculine given name

- Pronunciation: Polish: [jaˈrɔ.swaf]
- Gender: masculine
- Language: Polish

Origin
- Origin: jar ("strong, fierce") + sław ("glory, fame")
- Region of origin: Poland

Other names
- Nickname: Jarek
- Related names: Jaroslav, Yaroslav

Jarosław (Polish: [jaˈrɔ.swaf]) is a Polish masculine given name. It is composed of the Slavic elements jar meaning "strong, fierce" and sław meaning "glory, fame".

The feminine form of the name is Jarosława (Polish: [jarɔˈswava]). Diminutive forms of the name include Jarek.

Jarosław is equivalent to the Czech and Slovak name Jaroslav and the Ukrainian and Russian name Yaroslav.

== Notable people with the name ==
=== Royalty and nobility ===
- Jarosław, Duke of Opole (1143–1201), Duke of Opole and Bishop of Wrocław
- Jarosław Bogoria of Skotniki (c. 1276–1376), Polish nobleman and bishop

=== A-J ===
- Jarosław Ambroziak (born 1962), Polish footballer
- Jarosław Araszkiewicz (born 1965), Polish football player and manager
- Jarosław Bako (born 1964), Polish footballer
- Jarosław Białek (born 1981), Polish footballer
- Jarosław Bieniuk (born 1979), Polish footballer
- Jarosław Biernat (1960–2019), Polish footballer
- Jarosław Boberek (born 1963), Polish actor
- Jarosław Brawata (born 1956), Polish judoka
- Jarosław Chwastek (born 1975), Polish footballer
- Jarosław Dąbrowski (1836–1871), Polish nobleman, general and independence activist
- Jaroslaw Drelich (born 1957), Polish-American engineer and scientist
- Jarosław Drozd (born 1955), Polish politologist and diplomat
- Jarosław Duda (computer scientist), Polish computer scientist
- Jarosław Duda (politician) (born 1964), Polish politician
- Jarosław Dworzański (born 1955), Polish politician
- Jarosław Fojut (born 1987), Polish footballer
- Jarosław Gibas (born 1967), Polish novelist and journalist
- Jarosław Gierejkiewicz (born 1965), Polish footballer
- Jarosław Godek (born 1981), Polish rower
- Jarosław Gonciarz (born 1970), Polish politician
- Jarosław Gowin (born 1961), Polish politician and editor
- Jarosław Grzędowicz (born 1965), Polish science-fiction and fantasy writer
- Jarosław Gugała (born 1959), Polish journalist, actor and musician
- Jarosław Guzy (born 1955), Polish politician and businessman
- Jarosław Góra (born 1964), Polish footballer
- Jarosław Hampel (born 1982), Polish motorcycle speedway rider
- Jarosław Iwaszkiewicz, (1894–1980), Polish writer, poet and translator
- Jarosław Jach (born 1994), Polish footballer
- Jarosław Jagiełło (born 1971), Polish politician
- Jarosław Janowski (born 1967), Polish rower
- Jarosław Jaros (born 1978), Polish cabaret actor
- Jarosław Jechorek (born 1961), Polish basketball player

=== K-P ===
- Jarosław Kaczyński (born 1949), Polish politician
- Jarosław Kalinowski (born 1962), Polish politician
- Jarosław Kaniecki (born 1967), Polish sprinter
- Jarosław Kapuściński (born 1964), Polish composer and pianist
- Jarosław Kaszowski (born 1978), Polish footballer
- Jarosław Kilian (born 1962), Polish director
- Jarosław Kisiel (born 1964), Polish fencer
- Jarosław Kotewicz (born 1969), Polish high jumper
- Jarosław Kowalczyk (born 1989), Polish racing cyclist
- Jarosław Kozakiewicz (born 1961), Polish artist
- Jarosław Kozidrak (1955–2018), Polish musician
- Jarosław Krajewski (born 1983), Polish politician
- Jarosław Krzyżanowski (born 1975), Polish footballer
- Jarosław Królewski (born 1986), Polish entrepreneur and investor
- Jarosław Kubicki (born 1995), Polish footballer
- Jarosław Kukowski (born 1972), Polish painter
- Jarosław Kukulski (1944–2010), Polish composer
- Jarosław Kuźniar (born 1978), Polish television and radio presenter
- Jarosław Lasecki (born 1961), Polish politician, entrepreneur and manager
- Jarosław Lato (born 1977), Polish footballer
- Jarosław Leitgeber (1848–1933), Polish writer, bookseller and publisher
- Jarosław Lewak (born 1973), Polish judoka
- Jarosław Lindenberg (born 1956), Polish diplomat and philosopher
- Jarosław Lindner (born 1988), Polish footballer
- Jarosław Lipszyc (born 1975), Polish poet and journalist
- Jarosław Łomnicki (1873–1931), Polish geologist and entomologist
- Jarosław Margielski (born 1987), Polish politician
- Jarosław Marycz (born 1987), Polish cyclist
- Jarosław Mazurkiewicz (born 1979), Polish footballer
- Jarosław Miczek (born 1982), Polish slalom canoeist
- Jarosław Mika (born 1962), Polish military officer
- Jarosław Mikołajewski (born 1960), Polish poet, writer and translator
- Jarosław Morawiecki (born 1964), Polish ice hockey player
- Jarosław Mucha (born 1997), Polish volleyball player
- Jarosław Musiał (1962–2021), Polish illustrator and comic book artist
- Jarosław Niezgoda (born 1995), Polish footballer
- Jarosław Nowicki (rower) (born 1970), Polish rower
- Jarosław Nowicki (born 1961), Polish footballer
- Jarosław Olech (born 1974), Polish powerlifter
- Jarosław Pacoń (1972–2021), Polish footballer
- Jaroslaw Padoch (1908–1998), Ukrainian jurist and journalist
- Jarosław Paśnik (born 1983), Polish footballer
- Jaroslaw Pelenski (1929–2022), Polish-Ukrainian historian and political scientist
- Jarosław Pijarowski (born 1971), Polish artist and art curator
- Jarosław Popiela (born 1974), Polish footballer

=== R-Z ===
- Jarosław Rodzewicz (born 1973), Polish fencer
- Jarosław Rębiewski (born 1974), Polish road cyclist
- Jarosław Rusiecki (born 1961), Polish politician
- Jarosław Marek Rymkiewicz (1935–2022), Polish poet, writer and literary critic
- Jarosław Sachajko (born 1971), Polish politician
- Jarosław Sellin (born 1963), Polish politician and journalist
- Jarosław Skrobacz (born 1967), Polish football manager
- Jarosław Skulski (1907–1977), Polish actor
- Jarosław Stawiarski (born 1963), Polish politician
- Jarosław Studzizba (1955–2025), Polish footballer
- Jarosław Suchoples (born 1969), Polish historian
- Jarosław Szarek (born 1963), Polish journalist, writer and historian
- Jarosław Szczepankiewicz (born 1962), Polish diplomat
- Jarosław Szymczyk (born 1970), Polish police officer
- Jarosław Tkocz (born 1973), Polish footballer
- Jaroslaw Trochanowski, Polish-Lemko composer and musician
- Jarosław Urbaniak (born 1966), Polish politician
- Jarosław Wasik (born 1971), Polish singer and songwriter
- Jarosław Wałęsa (born 1976), Polish politician
- Jarosław Wierczuk (born 1977), Polish racing driver
- Jarosław Wołkonowski (born 1956), Polish-Lithuanian historian and university professor
- Jarosław Żaczek (born 1967), Polish politician
- Jarosław Zarębski (born 1979), Polish former road cyclist
- Jarosław Zieliński (born 1960), Polish politician
- Jarosław Ziętara (born 1968), Polish journalist

=== Jarosława ===
- Jarosława Jóźwiakowska (born 1937), Polish athlete
- Jarosława Mirowska, Polish spy

== See also ==
- Jarosław (disambiguation)
- Aaron Jarosław (fl. 18th century), Polish biblical scholar
- Jaroslav
- Polish name
- Slavic names
