= Jarek =

Male given name

- Pronunciation: Polish: [ˈjarɛk]
- Gender: Male

Other names
- Related names: Jarosław, Jaroslav, Jaromir

Jarek is a Slavic male given name. It can be a nickname for the Polish name Jarosław. Notable people with this name include:

- Jarek Broussard, American American football player
- Jarek Dymek (born 1971), Polish strongman competitor
- Jarek Goebel (born 1985), New Zealand Rugby player
- Jarek Hardy, Canadian musician with The Johnstones
- Jarek Kasar (born 1983), Estonian singer
- Jarek Kolář (born 1977), Czech video game designer and producer
- Jarek Kupsc (born 1966), Polish-American film director and screen writer
- Jarek Lancaster (born 1990), American American football player
- Jarek Molski, American disability rights campaigner
- Jarek Nohavica or Jaromír Nohavica, Czech musician and poet
- Jarek Pozarycki, Polish musician with Elgibbor
- Jarek Srnensky (born 1963), Swiss tennis player
- Jarek Śmietana (1951–2013), Polish jazz musician

Fictional characters

- Jarek, Mortal Kombat character

== See also ==
- Engelbert Jarek (1935–2017), Polish football player
