= 2011 Stanford Cardinal football team =

American college football season

2011 Stanford Cardinal football

Pac-12 North Division co-champion

Fiesta Bowl, L 38–41^{OT} vs. Oklahoma State
- Conference: Pac-12 Conference
- North Division

Ranking
- Coaches: No. 7
- AP: No. 7
- Record: 11–2 (8–1 Pac-12)
- Head coach: David Shaw (1st season)
- Offensive coordinator: Pep Hamilton (1st season)
- Offensive scheme: West Coast
- Defensive coordinator: Derek Mason (1st season)
- Co-defensive coordinator: Jason Tarver (1st season)
- Base defense: 3–4
- Captains: Andrew Luck; Michael Thomas
- Home stadium: Stanford Stadium

2011 Pac-12 Conference football standings
	Conf.			Overall
Team	W		L	W		L
North Division
No. 4 Oregon xy$	8	–	1	12	–	2
No. 7 Stanford x%	8	–	1	11	–	2
Washington	5	–	4	7	–	6
California	4	–	5	7	–	6
Oregon State	3	–	6	3	–	9
Washington State	2	–	7	4	–	8
South Division
No. 6 USC †	7	–	2	10	–	2
UCLA xy	5	–	4	6	–	8
Utah	4	–	5	8	–	5
Arizona State	4	–	5	6	–	7
Arizona	2	–	7	4	–	8
Colorado	2	–	7	3	–	10
Championship: Oregon 49, UCLA 31
$ – BCS representative as conference champion; % – BCS at-large representative; x – Division champion/co-champions; y – Championship game participant; † – USC ineligible for championship and postseason due to NCAA sanctions; Rankings from AP Poll

The 2011 Stanford Cardinal football team represented Stanford University in the 2011 NCAA Division I FBS college football season. The Cardinal were led by former offensive coordinator and new head coach David Shaw, as Jim Harbaugh departed following the 2010 season in order to become the head coach of the San Francisco 49ers. They played their home games at Stanford Stadium and are members of the North Division of the Pac-12 Conference. They finished the season with 11–2 in overall record, 8–1 in Pac-12 play to finish in a tie with Oregon for first place in the North Division. Due to their head-to-head loss to Oregon, they did not represent the division in the inaugural Pac-12 Football Championship Game. They were invited the Fiesta Bowl, their second consecutive BCS game, where they were defeated by Oklahoma State 38–41 in overtime.

== Schedule ==
Date	Time	Opponent	Rank	Site	TV	Result	Attendance
September 3	2:00 p.m.	San Jose State*	No. 7	Stanford Stadium; Stanford, CA (Bill Walsh Legacy Game)	CSNBA	W 57–3	47,816
September 10	12:30 p.m.	at Duke*	No. 6	Wallace Wade Stadium; Durham, NC	ESPNU	W 44–14	24,785
September 17	7:45 p.m.	at Arizona	No. 6	Arizona Stadium; Tucson, AZ	ESPN	W 37–10	49,636
October 1	7:30 p.m.	UCLA	No. 6	Stanford Stadium; Stanford, CA (rivalry)	FSN	W 45–19	50,360
October 8	4:30 p.m.	Colorado	No. 7	Stanford Stadium; Stanford, CA	Versus	W 48–7	50,360
October 15	4:30 p.m.	at Washington State	No. 7	Martin Stadium; Pullman, WA	Versus	W 44–14	30,843
October 22	5:00 p.m.	No. 22 Washington^{†}	No. 7	Stanford Stadium; Stanford, CA	ABC/ESPN3	W 65–21	50,360
October 29	5:00 p.m.	at No. 20 USC	No. 4	Los Angeles Memorial Coliseum; Los Angeles, CA (College GameDay, rivalry)	ABC/ESPN3	W 56–48 ^{3OT}	93,607
November 5	12:30 p.m.	at Oregon State	No. 4	Reser Stadium; Corvallis, OR	ABC	W 38–13	42,835
November 12	5:00 p.m.	No. 6 Oregon	No. 3	Stanford Stadium; Stanford, CA (College GameDay, rivalry)	ABC	L 30–53	50,360
November 19	7:15 p.m.	California	No. 8	Stanford Stadium; Stanford, CA (114th Big Game/Stanford Axe)	ESPN	W 31–28	50,360
November 26	5:00 p.m.	No. 22 Notre Dame*	No. 4	Stanford Stadium; Stanford, CA (Legends Trophy)	ABC	W 28–14	50,360
January 2, 2012	5:30 p.m.	vs. No. 3 Oklahoma State*	No. 4	University of Phoenix Stadium; Glendale, AZ (Fiesta Bowl)	ESPN	L 38–41 ^{OT}	69,927
*Non-conference game; ^{†}Homecoming; Rankings from AP Poll released prior to the game; All times are in Pacific time

== Game summaries ==
=== San Jose State ===
San Jose State at #7 Stanford

Team	1	2	3	4	Total
Spartans	0	3	0	0	3
• Cardinal	10	17	16	14	57

- Date: September 3
- Location: Stanford Stadium, Stanford, California
- Game start: 2:00 p.m. PDT
- TV announcers (CSNBA): Scott Reiss (Play-by-play), Mike McLaughlin (Color) & Chris Townsend (Sideline)

Scoring summary
1	8:51	STAN	Jordan Williamson 23-yard field goal	STAN 3–0
1	0:57	STAN	Andrew Luck 1-yard run (Jordan Williamson kick)	STAN 10–0
2	14:55	STAN	Zach Ertz 13-yard pass from Andrew Luck (Jordan Williamson kick)	STAN 17–0
2	9:48	STAN	Jordan Williamson 37-yard field goal	STAN 20–0
2	2:25	STAN	Ryan Hewitt 2-yard pass from Andrew Luck (Jordan Williamson kick)	STAN 27–0
2	0:49	SJSU	Harrison Waid 18-yard field goal	STAN 27–3
3	13:13	STAN	Safety, Matt Faulkner tackled by Ben Gardner in end zone	STAN 29–3
3	6:08	STAN	Stepfan Taylor 3-yard run (Jordan Williamson kick)	STAN 36–3
3	2:07	STAN	Stepfan Taylor 1-yard run (Jordan Williamson kick)	STAN 43–3
4	10:02	STAN	Tyler Gaffney 16-yard run (Jordan Williamson kick)	STAN 50–3
4	9:04	STAN	Coby Fleener 39-yard pass from Brett Nottingham (Jordan Williamson kick)	STAN 57–3

Known as the "Bill Walsh Legacy Game" (Bill Walsh was a graduate of San Jose State and a two-time head coach at Stanford), this game marked the 65th meeting between Stanford and San Jose State—the most times Stanford has faced a single non-Pac-12 opponent. Entering the game with a record-high #7 preseason ranking (this ties the 1950 team's #7 preseason ranking, the team's highest-ever ranking), the Cardinal achieved their 50th win in the series as 2011 Heisman Trophy runner-up Andrew Luck threw two touchdown passes and ran for a third. In all, six Stanford players scored touchdowns, with running back Stepfan Taylor scoring twice on short rushes.

=== At Duke ===
#6 Stanford at Duke

Team	1	2	3	4	Total
• Cardinal	7	10	13	14	44
Blue Devils	0	7	0	7	14

- Date: September 10
- Location: Wallace Wade Stadium, Durham, North Carolina
- Game start: 3:30 p.m. EDT
- TV announcers (ESPNU): Clay Matvick (Play-by-play), Brian Griese (Color) & Allison Williams (Sideline)

Scoring summary
1	10:01	STAN	Coby Fleener 3-yard pass from Andrew Luck (Jordan Williamson kick)	STAN 7–0
2	12:01	STAN	Jordan Williamson 40-yard field goal	STAN 10–0
2	2:14	DUKE	Lee Butler 76-yard interception return (Will Snyderwine kick)	STAN 10–7
2	0:39	STAN	Chris Owusu 10-yard pass from Andrew Luck (Jordan Williamson kick)	STAN 17–7
3	6:41	STAN	Coby Fleener 60-yard pass from Andrew Luck (Jordan Williamson kick)	STAN 24–7
3	4:06	STAN	Jeremy Stewart 30-yard run (kick failed)	STAN 30–7
4	14:56	STAN	Zach Ertz 3-yard pass from Andrew Luck (Jordan Williamson kick)	STAN 37–7
4	8:00	STAN	Tyler Gaffney 30-yard run (Jordan Williamson kick)	STAN 44–7
4	0:57	DUKE	Anthony Boone 2-yard run (Jeffrey Ijjas kick)	STAN 44–14

The Cardinal held a 10–0 lead late in the first half due to an Andrew Luck touchdown pass to Coby Fleener and a 40-yard Jordan Williamson field goal. Duke made a game of it after safety Lee Butler returned a deflected pass 76 yards for a touchdown and the Blue Devils recovered an onside kick on the next play. But Stanford held Duke to a single series, and following a short punt, scored another touchdown before halftime. The second half was all Stanford, as Luck threw two more touchdowns, Jonathan Stewart ran for a 30-yard score, and Tyler Gaffney added a one-yard plunge to rout the Blue Devils.

=== At Arizona ===
#6 Stanford at Arizona

Team	1	2	3	4	Total
• Cardinal	10	6	7	14	37
Wildcats	0	10	0	0	10

- Date: September 17
- Location: Arizona Stadium, Tucson, Arizona
- Game start: 7:45 p.m. MST
- TV announcers (ESPN): Carter Blackburn (Play-by-play), Brock Huard (Color) & Shelley Smith (Sideline)

Scoring summary
1	6:11	STAN	Jordan Williamson 20-yard field goal	STAN 3–0
1	1:59	STAN	Anthony Wilkerson 24-yard run (Jordan Williamson kick)	STAN 10–0
2	14:15	ARIZ	Jaime Salazar 27-yard field goal	STAN 10–3
2	9:42	STAN	Jordan Williamson 45-yard field goal	STAN 13–3
2	5:57	ARIZ	Juron Criner 6-yard pass from Nick Foles (Jaime Salazar kick)	STAN 13–10
2	1:22	STAN	Jordan Williamson 33-yard field goal	STAN 16–10
3	5:22	STAN	Zach Ertz 16-yard pass from Andrew Luck (Jordan Williamson kick)	STAN 23–10
4	14:54	STAN	Levine Toilolo 34-yard pass from Andrew Luck (Jordan Williamson kick)	STAN 30–10
4	8:00	STAN	Jeremy Stewart 2-yard run (Jordan Williamson kick)	STAN 37–10

Stepfan Taylor rushed for a career-high 153 yards and Andrew Luck threw for 325 yards as the Cardinal held the Wildcats scoreless in the second half to win 37–10. Arizona quarterback Nick Foles completed his first 17 passes for 198 yards and a touchdown, but after that, he was 7 for 16 and 41 yards as the Cardinal began to break down the passing attack. The victory was costly for the Cardinal, however, as junior linebacker and leading tackler Shayne Skov suffered a season-ending knee injury in the second quarter.

=== UCLA ===
UCLA at #6 Stanford

Team	1	2	3	4	Total
Bruins	0	7	6	6	19
• Cardinal	7	10	14	14	45

- Date: October 1
- Location: Stanford Stadium, Stanford, California
- Game start: 7:30 PDT
- TV announcers (FSN): Joel Meyers (Play-by-play), Brian Baldinger (Color) & Jim Knox (Sideline)

Scoring summary
1	0:09	STAN	Coby Fleener 18-yard pass from Andrew Luck (Jordan Williamson kick)	STAN 7–0
2	9:19	STAN	Stepfan Taylor 2-yard run (Jordan Williamson kick)	STAN 14–0
2	2:37	STAN	Jordan Williamson 23-yard field goal	STAN 17–0
2	0:08	UCLA	Joseph Fauria 12-yard pass from Richard Brehaut (Jeff Locke kick)	STAN 17–7
3	14:15	STAN	Coby Fleener 51-yard pass from Andrew Luck (Jordan Williamson kick)	STAN 24–7
3	10:31	UCLA	Joseph Fauria 13-yard pass from Richard Brehaut (kick failed)	STAN 24–13
3	2:43	STAN	Tyler Gaffney 16-yard run (Jordan Williamson kick)	STAN 31–13
4	13:21	UCLA	Josh Smith 7-yard run (kick failed)	STAN 31–19
4	10:22	STAN	Stepfan Taylor 1-yard run (Jordan Williamson kick)	STAN 38–19
4	1:51	STAN	Chris Owusu 5-yard pass from Andrew Luck (Jordan Williamson kick)	STAN 45–19

Coming into the game, Stanford trailed UCLA 45–33–3 in a series that dates back to 1925 and both teams had the same 19–19–2 record for games played at Stanford. Stanford's Coby Fleener scored on 18 and 51-yard receptions and Stepfan Taylor added two rushing touchdowns as the Cardinal downed UCLA 45–19. UCLA tight end Joseph Fauria caught two of the Bruin touchdown passes.

=== Colorado ===
Colorado at #7 Stanford

Team	1	2	3	4	Total
Buffaloes	0	7	0	0	7
• Cardinal	13	14	14	7	48

- Date: October 8
- Location: Stanford Stadium, Stanford, California
- Game start: 4:30 p.m. PDT
- TV announcers (Versus): Ted Robinson (Play-by-play), Glenn Parker (Color) & Akbar Gbaja-Biamila (Sideline)

Scoring summary
1	11:01	STAN	Max Bergen 75-yard blocked field goal return (Jordan Williamson kick)	STAN 7–0
1	5:33	STAN	Stepfan Taylor 1-yard run (kick failed)	STAN 13–0
2	12:54	COL	Tony Jones 7-yard pass from Tyler Hansen (Will Oliver kick)	STAN 13–7
2	6:48	STAN	Jeremy Stewart 1-yard run (Jordan Williamson kick)	STAN 20–7
2	2:07	STAN	Ryan Hewitt 1-yard pass from Andrew Luck (Jordan Williamson kick)	STAN 27–7
3	11:03	STAN	Ryan Hewitt 10-yard pass from Andrew Luck (Jordan Williamson kick)	STAN 34–7
3	2:03	STAN	Tyler Gaffney 1-yard run (Jordan Williamson kick)	STAN 41–7
4	11:02	STAN	Griff Whalen 30-yard pass from Andrew Luck (Jordan Williamson kick)	STAN 48–7

Andrew Luck threw for 370 yards—the second-most in his college career—and three touchdowns as the Cardinal routed Colorado, 48–7 and improved to 5–0 on the season, Stanford's best start since the 1951 season. Stanford linebacker Max Bergen blocked a Colorado field goal attempt in the first quarter and ran back the ball 75 yards for Stanford's first score. Fullback Ryan Hewitt caught two of Luck's touchdown passes with Griff Whalen catching the other. Three different running backs scored for the Cardinal on one-yard rushes.

=== At Washington State ===
#7 Stanford at Washington State

Team	1	2	3	4	Total
• Cardinal	3	7	14	20	44
Cougars	0	7	0	7	14

- Date: October 15
- Location: Martin Stadium, Pullman, Washington
- Game start: 4:30 p.m. PDT
- TV announcers (Versus): Ted Robinson (Play-by-play), Glenn Parker (Color) & Akbar Gbaja-Biamila (Sideline)

Scoring summary
1	1:34	STAN	Jordan Williamson 23-yard field goal	STAN 3–0
2	8:41	STAN	Jeremy Stewart 1-yard run (Jordan Williamson kick)	STAN 10–0
2	2:18	WSU	Carl Winston 2-yard run (Andrew Furney kick)	STAN 10–7
3	10:58	STAN	Levine Toilolo 10-yard pass from Andrew Luck (Jordan Williamson kick)	STAN 17–7
3	1:18	STAN	Levine Toilolo 26-yard pass from Andrew Luck (Jordan Williamson kick)	STAN 24–7
4	13:52	STAN	Stepfan Taylor 8-yard pass from Andrew Luck (Jordan Williamson kick)	STAN 31–7
4	4:26	STAN	Coby Fleener 28-yard pass from Andrew Luck (Jordan Williamson kick)	STAN 38–7
4	0:14	WSU	Marshall Lobbestael 1-yard run (Andrew Furney kick)	STAN 38–14
4	0:00	STAN	Ty Montgomery 96-yard kickoff return (no kick)	STAN 44–14

Andrew Luck threw an interception on his first pass of the game, but recovered to throw four second-half passes—two to tight end Levine Toilolo—as the Cardinal routed the Cougars, 44–14. At the end of the first half, Washington State had closed to within 10–7 on a two-yard run from Carl Winston, but that would end their scoring until a short touchdown dive with 14 seconds left in the game. On the ensuing kickoff of that final Cougar touchdown, Stanford's Ty Montgomery returned the kick 96 yards as time expired to give the Cardinal a 30-point win. Stanford won its 14th consecutive game, setting a school record (breaking the marks set in 1904–1905 and 1939–1940–1941) and extending the nation's longest current winning streak. The team won by its ninth consecutive 25+ point victory margin, the longest such streak in the BCS era since Boise State in 2002.

=== Washington ===
#22 Washington at #7 Stanford

Team	1	2	3	4	Total
Huskies	7	7	0	7	21
• Cardinal	10	28	10	17	65

- Date: October 22
- Location: Stanford Stadium, Stanford, California
- Game start: 5:00 p.m. PDT
- TV announcers (ABC/ESPN3): Sean McDonough (Play-by-play), Matt Millen (Color) & Heather Cox (Sideline)

Scoring summary
1	11:35	STAN	Jeremy Stewart 2-yard run (Jordan Williamson kick)	STAN 7–0
1	6:46	STAN	Jordan Williamson 39-yard field goal	STAN 10–0
1	3:00	WASH	Chris Polk 46-yard run (Erik Folk kick)	STAN 10–7
2	14:26	STAN	Coby Fleener 1-yard pass from Andrew Luck (Jordan Williamson kick)	STAN 17–7
2	13:34	WASH	Chris Polk 61-yard run (Erik Folk kick)	STAN 17–14
2	13:18	STAN	Stepfan Taylor 70-yard run (Jordan Williamson kick)	STAN 24–14
2	3:44	STAN	Drew Terrell 5-yard pass from Andrew Luck (Jordan Williamson kick)	STAN 31–14
2	0:56	STAN	Michael Thomas 62-yard interception return (Jordan Williamson kick)	STAN 38–14
3	11:16	STAN	Tyler Gaffney 4-yard run (Jordan Williamson kick)	STAN 45–14
3	3:51	STAN	Jordan Williamson 30-yard field goal	STAN 48–14
4	12:48	WASH	Evan Hudson 2-yard pass from Keith Price (Erik Folk kick)	STAN 48–21
4	9:14	STAN	Anthony Wilkerson 18-yard run (Jordan Williamson kick)	STAN 55–21
4	7:37	STAN	Jordan Williamson 32-yard field goal	STAN 62–21
4	1:25	STAN	Anthony Wilkerson 38-yard run (Jordan Williamson kick)	STAN 65–21

Stanford set a single-game school rushing record of 446 yards (breaking the previous record of 439 set against Oregon State in 1981, led by Darrin Nelson's 190 yards) as the Cardinal overpowered the visiting Huskies 65–21. Stepfan Taylor ran for 138 yards and a touchdown, Tyler Gaffney had 117 yards and a touchdown, and Anthony Wilkerson had 93 yards and two touchdowns. The Cardinal extended its streak of 15 consecutive wins (longest in school history, and longest current streak in the nation), as well as 10 consecutive wins by more than 25 points (longest streak in college football since the poll era began in 1936). Washington's Chris Polk had two long touchdown runs to highlight Washington's scoring.

=== At USC ===
#4 Stanford at #20 USC

Team	1	2	3	4	OT	2OT	3OT	Total
• Cardinal	7	3	14	10	7	7	8	56
Trojans	3	3	14	14	7	7	0	48

- Date: October 29
- Location: Los Angeles Memorial Coliseum, Los Angeles
- Game start: 5:00 p.m. PDT
- TV announcers (ABC/ESPN3): Brent Musburger (Play-by-play), Kirk Herbstreit (Color) & Erin Andrews (Sideline)

Scoring summary
1	8:56	STAN	Tyler Gaffney 10-yard pass from Andrew Luck (Eric Whitaker kick)	STAN 7–0
1	0:14	USC	Andre Heidari 22-yard field goal	STAN 7–3
2	7:10	STAN	Eric Whitaker 33-yard field goal	STAN 10–3
2	0:11	USC	Andre Heidari 50-yard field goal	STAN 10–6
3	13:54	USC	Curtis McNeal 61-yard run (Andre Heidari kick)	USC 13–10
3	10:30	USC	Curtis McNeal 25-yard run (Andre Heidari kick)	USC 20–10
3	6:34	STAN	Ryan Hewitt 5-yard pass from Andrew Luck (Eric Whitaker kick)	USC 20–17
3	1:22	STAN	Andrew Luck 2-yard run (Eric Whitaker kick)	STAN 24–20
4	13:04	USC	Marqise Lee 28-yard pass from Matt Barkley (Andre Heidari kick)	USC 27–24
4	5:10	STAN	Eric Whitaker 29-yard field goal	Tied 27–27
4	3:08	USC	Nickell Robey 33-yard interception return (Andre Heidari kick)	USC 34–27
4	0:38	STAN	Stefan Taylor 2-yard run (Eric Whitaker kick)	Tied 34–34
OT		STAN	Jeremy Stewart 1-yard run (Eric Whitaker kick)	STAN 41–34
OT		USC	Robert Woods 15-yard pass from Matt Barkley (Andre Heidari kick)	Tied 41–41
2OT		USC	Randall Telfer 12-yard pass from Matt Barkley (Andre Heidari kick)	USC 48–41
2OT		STAN	Levine Toilolo 11-yard pass from Andrew Luck (Eric Whitaker kick)	Tied 48–48
3OT		STAN	Stepfan Taylor 5-yard run (Andrew Luck to Coby Fleener pass)	STAN 56–48

The Cardinal outlasted the Trojans in a triple overtime thriller, winning 56–48, and remaining unbeaten and in the hunt for the 2012 BCS National Championship Game. The Cardinal led 10–6 at halftime, but on the first series of the second half, USC running back Curtis MacNeal broke free for a 61-yard touchdown run to put the Cardinal behind in a game for the first time all season. MacNeal added another score on USC's next series to put Stanford further in the hole. But Stanford quarterback Andrew Luck led the Cardinal right back, firing a 5-yard touchdown pass to Ryan Hewitt and adding a 2-yard rush of his own to put the Cardinal back up by 3 at the end of three quarters. In the fourth quarter, Trojans quarterback Matt Barkley put USC ahead on a 28-yard touchdown pass to Marqise Lee, which was followed by a Stanford field goal to tie the game at 27 apiece.

With about 5 minutes remaining, Stanford began what they hoped would be a game-winning last drive, but Luck's pass was intercepted by Nickell Robey and returned for a USC score to put the Trojans on top. But the Cardinal recovered, and on the ensuing drive, Luck led the Cardinal for a tying Stepfan Taylor touchdown rush with 38 seconds left to send the game to overtime. After both teams scored in the first two overtime periods, the Cardinal had the ball first in the third overtime, scoring on a Taylor 5-yard run and converting on the mandatory 2-point conversion. On the first play of USC's possession, Barkley completed a 21-yard pass to Lee to put the Trojans on the 4-yard line. On the next play, Barkley handed off to MacNeal. Stanford defensive tackle Terrence Stephens reached up from the ground and stripped the ball, which rolled into the end zone where Stanford linebacker A.J. Tarpley pounced on it to end the game and secure a Stanford victory.

=== At Oregon State ===
#4 Stanford at Oregon State

Team	1	2	3	4	Total
• Cardinal	0	17	14	7	38
Beavers	0	7	6	0	13

- Date: November 5
- Location: Reser Stadium, Corvallis, Oregon
- Game start: 12:30 p.m. PDT
- TV announcers (ABC): Carter Blackburn (Play-by-play) & Brock Huard (Color)

Scoring summary
2	14:57	STAN	Jeremy Stewart 2-yard run (Eric Whitaker kick)	STAN 7–0
2	7:51	STAN	Griff Whalen 17-yard pass from Andrew Luck (Eric Whitaker kick)	STAN 14–0
2	5:25	OSU	James Rodgers 15-yard pass from Sean Mannion (Trevor Romaine kick)	STAN 14–7
2	0:35	STAN	Eric Whitaker 31-yard field goal	STAN 17–7
3	11:59	OSU	Malcolm Agnew 2-yard run (kick blocked)	STAN 17–13
3	2:40	STAN	Stepfan Taylor 27-yard pass from Andrew Luck (Eric Whitaker kick)	STAN 24–13
3	0:35	STAN	Coby Fleener 14-yard pass from Andrew Luck (Eric Whitaker kick)	STAN 31–13
4	6:07	STAN	Tyler Gaffney 10-yard run (Eric Whitaker kick)	STAN 38–13

Stanford rushed for 300 yards behind strong performances from all its backs, led by Stepfan Taylor's 95 yards, to hold off the Beavers, 38–13. Andrew Luck threw for 206 yards and 3 touchdowns, while Oregon State's Sean Mannion threw for 252 yards and one touchdown. Luck moved within 6 passing touchdowns of both the Stanford single-season mark of 32 (set by Luck in 2010) and of the Stanford career touchdown mark of 77 held by John Elway.

=== Oregon ===
#6 Oregon at #3 Stanford

Team	1	2	3	4	Total
• Ducks	8	14	14	17	53
Cardinal	0	16	7	7	30

- Date: November 12
- Location: Stanford Stadium, Stanford, California
- Game start: 5:00 p.m. PST
- TV announcers (ABC): Brent Musburger (Play-by-play), Kirk Herbstreit (Color) & Erin Andrews (Sideline)

Scoring summary
1	4:12	ORE	Lavasier Tuinei 4 Yd Pass From Darron Thomas (David Paulson pass to Mike Garrity)	ORE 8–0
2	13:51	STAN	Griff Whalen 16-yard pass from Andrew Luck (PAT failed)	ORE 8–6
2	11:49	ORE	LaMichael James 58-yard run (Alejandro Maldonado kick)	ORE 15–6
2	4:57	STAN	Eric Whitaker 37 yard field goal	ORE 15–9
2	2:52	ORE	De'Anthony Thomas 41-yard pass from Darron Thomas (Alejandro Maldonado kick)	ORE 22–9
2	0:24	STAN	Griff Whalen 13-yard pass from Andrew Luck (Eric Whitaker kick)	ORE 22–16
3	13:23	ORE	Josh Huff 59-yard pass from Darron Thomas (Alejandro Maldonado kick)	ORE 29–16
3	7:41	ORE	LaMichael James 4-yard run (Alejandro Maldonado kick)	ORE 36–16
3	2:38	STAN	Jeremy Stewart 2-yard pass from Andrew Luck (Eric Whitaker kick)	ORE 36–23
4	14:02	ORE	LaMichael James 1-yard run (Alejandro Maldonado kick)	ORE 43–23
4	9:37	STAN	Jeremy Stewart 1-yard run (Eric Whitaker kick)	ORE 43–30
4	5:09	ORE	Alejandro Maldonado 40-yard field goal	ORE 46–30
4	4:28	ORE	Boseko Lokombo 40 Yd interception return (Alejandro Maldonado kick)	ORE 53–30

Oregon's LaMichael James rushed for 146 yards and 3 touchdowns as the #6 Ducks defeated the #3 Cardinal 53–30. After falling behind early in the first half, the Cardinal closed to within a touchdown on an Andrew Luck touchdown pass to Griff Whalen shortly before halftime. The Ducks blew the game open in the second half, with two short touchdowns by James and a Boseko Lokombo interception of a Luck pass returned 40 yards for a touchdown. Stanford did not lose at home again until the second game of the 2014 season, when it lost 13-10 to visiting USC, ending the longest home winning streak in the nation at 17.

=== California ===
California at #9 Stanford

Team	1	2	3	4	Total
Golden Bears	10	3	0	15	28
• Cardinal	7	7	14	3	31

- Date: November 19
- Location: Stanford Stadium, Stanford, California
- Game start: 7:15 p.m. PST
- TV announcers (ESPN): Carter Blackburn (Play-by-play), Brock Huard (Color) & Shelley Smith (Sideline)

Scoring summary
1	13:42	STAN	Ty Montgomery 34-yard run (Jordan Williamson kick)	STAN 7–0
1	7:12	CAL	Giorgio Tavecchio 25-yard field goal	STAN 7–3
1	5:53	CAL	Keenan Allen 17-yard pass from Zach Maynard (Giorgio Tavecchio kick)	CAL 10–7
2	10:40	CAL	Giorgio Tavecchio 19-yard field goal	CAL 13–7
2	7:10	STAN	Tyler Gaffney 6-yard run (Jordan Williamson kick)	STAN 14–13
3	10:12	STAN	Levine Toilolo 4-yard pass from Andrew Luck (Jordan Williamson kick)	STAN 21–13
3	5:42	STAN	Ryan Hewitt 10-yard pass from Andrew Luck (Jordan Williamson kick)	STAN 28–13
4	10:53	CAL	Spencer Hagen 3-yard pass from Zach Maynard (Zach Maynard to Marvin Jones pass)	STAN 28–21
4	3:07	STAN	Jordan Williamson 35-yard field goal	STAN 31–21
4	0:14	CAL	C.J. Anderson 1-yard run (Giorgio Tavecchio kick)	STAN 31–28

In a rain-soaked game, the Cardinal held on to defeat the Bears 31–28. The Cardinal scored on the third play from scrimmage on a reverse to Ty Montgomery, who ran 34 yards for the score. The Bears added two Giorgio Tavecchio field goals and a 17-yard touchdown pass from Zack Maynard to Keenan Allen to move in front 13–7, before a Tyler Gaffney run gave Stanford back the lead in the middle of the third quarter. Touchdown passes to Levine Toilolo and Ryan Hewitt in the third quarter extended the lead. The Bears scored two fourth-quarter touchdowns to move within 3 points with seconds to play, but Stanford recovered the onside kick to retain possession of the Axe for another year.

=== Notre Dame ===
#22 Notre Dame at #4 Stanford

Team	1	2	3	4	Total
Fighting Irish	0	0	7	7	14
• Cardinal	7	14	0	7	28

- Date: November 26
- Location: Stanford Stadium, Stanford, California
- Game start: 5:00 p.m. PST
- TV announcers (ABC): Brent Musburger (Play-by-play), Kirk Herbstreit (Color) & Erin Andrews (Sideline)

Scoring summary
1	9:16	STAN	Levine Toilolo 3-yard pass from Andrew Luck (Jordan Williamson kick)	STAN 7–0
2	4:45	STAN	Coby Fleener 28-yard pass from Andrew Luck (Jordan Williamson)	STAN 14–0
2	0:10	STAN	Ty Montgomery 11-yard pass from Andrew Luck (Jordan Williamson)	STAN 21–0
3	6:21	ND	Michael Floyd 6-yard pass from Andrew Hendrix (David Ruffer kick)	STAN 21–7
4	5:40	STAN	Coby Fleener 55-yard pass from Andrew Luck (Jordan Williamson kick)	STAN 28–7
4	0:23	ND	Andrew Hendrix 2-yard run (David Ruffer kick)	STAN 28–14

Powered by four Andrew Luck touchdown passes, the Cardinal defeated the Fighting Irish in Luck's final home game at Stanford 28–14. With the first score, Luck tied John Elway's Stanford career touchdown total, and surpassed it. The Stanford defense held Notre Dame scoreless until midway through the third quarter, forcing a fumble and recording two interceptions. The Cardinal won its third in a row against Notre Dame, extending its longest winning streak in the rivalry that dates to 1925.

=== Fiesta Bowl vs. Oklahoma State ===
#4 Stanford vs. #3 Oklahoma State

Team	1	2	3	4	OT	Total
Cardinal	7	14	7	10	0	38
• Cowboys	0	21	3	14	3	41

- Date: January 2
- Location: University of Phoenix Stadium, Glendale, Arizona
- Game start: 6:50 p.m. MST
- Game attendance: 69,927
- TV announcers (ESPN): Sean McDonough (Play-by-play), Matt Millen (Color) & Heather Cox (Sideline)

Scoring summary
1	4:16	STAN	Ty Montgomery 53-yard pass from Andrew Luck (Jordan Williamson kick)	STAN 7–0
2	10:21	STAN	Jeremy Stewart 24-yard run (Jordan Williamson kick)	STAN 14–0
2	8:50	OSU	Justin Blackmon 43-yard pass from Brandon Weeden (Quinn Sharp kick)	STAN 14–7
2	6:19	OSU	Justin Blackmon 67-yard pass from Brandon Weeden (Quinn Sharp kick)	Tied 14–14
2	2:25	STAN	Stepfan Taylor 4-yard run (Jordan Williamson kick)	STAN 21–14
2	0:27	OSU	Brandon Weeden 2-yard run (Quinn Sharp kick)	Tied 21–21
3	8:22	STAN	Zach Ertz 16-yard pass from Andrew Luck (Jordan Williamson kick)	STAN 28–21
3	5:21	OSU	Quinn Sharp 19-yard field goal	STAN 28–24
4	14:16	STAN	Jordan Williamson 30-yard field goal	STAN 31-24
4	11:53	OSU	Justin Blackmon 17-yard pass from Brandon Weeden (Quinn Sharp kick)	Tied 31–31
4	4:34	STAN	Stepfan Taylor 1-yard run (Jordan Williamson kick)	STAN 38–31
4	2:35	OSU	Joseph Randle 4-yard run (Quinn Sharp kick)	Tied 38–38
OT		OSU	Quinn Sharp 22-yard field goal	OSU 41–38

In a back-and-forth thriller, the Cardinal fell to the Cowboys in overtime, 41–38, after kicker Jordan Williamson missed two late field goals, one at the end of regulation and one in overtime. Stanford rolled up 590 yards of total offense, including 347 passing yards and two touchdown passes from Andrew Luck and 177 rushing yards and two touchdowns from Stepfan Taylor, but Oklahoma State kept them close, forcing four ties but never taking the lead until the game's final play. Cowboys' quarterback Brandon Weeden and receiver Justin Blackmon connected for three touchdown passes, but ultimately, the game was decided by special teams, with Oklahoma State kicker Quinn Sharp connecting on a 22-yard field goal in overtime shortly after Williamson missed his attempt from 43 yards.

== Rankings ==
Ranking movements Legend: ██ Increase in ranking ██ Decrease in ranking ( ) = First-place votes
	Week															
Poll	Pre	1	2	3	4	5	6	7	8	9	10	11	12	13	14	Final
AP	7	6	6	5	6	7	7	7	4	4	3	8	4	4	4	7
Coaches	6	6	6	5	4	4	5	5	3	3	2	9	5	4	4	7
Harris	Not released						7 (1)	7 (1)	4 (1)	4 (1)	3 (2)	7	4	3	4	Not released
BCS	Not released							8	6	4	4	9	6	4	4	Not released

== Personnel ==
=== Coaching staff ===
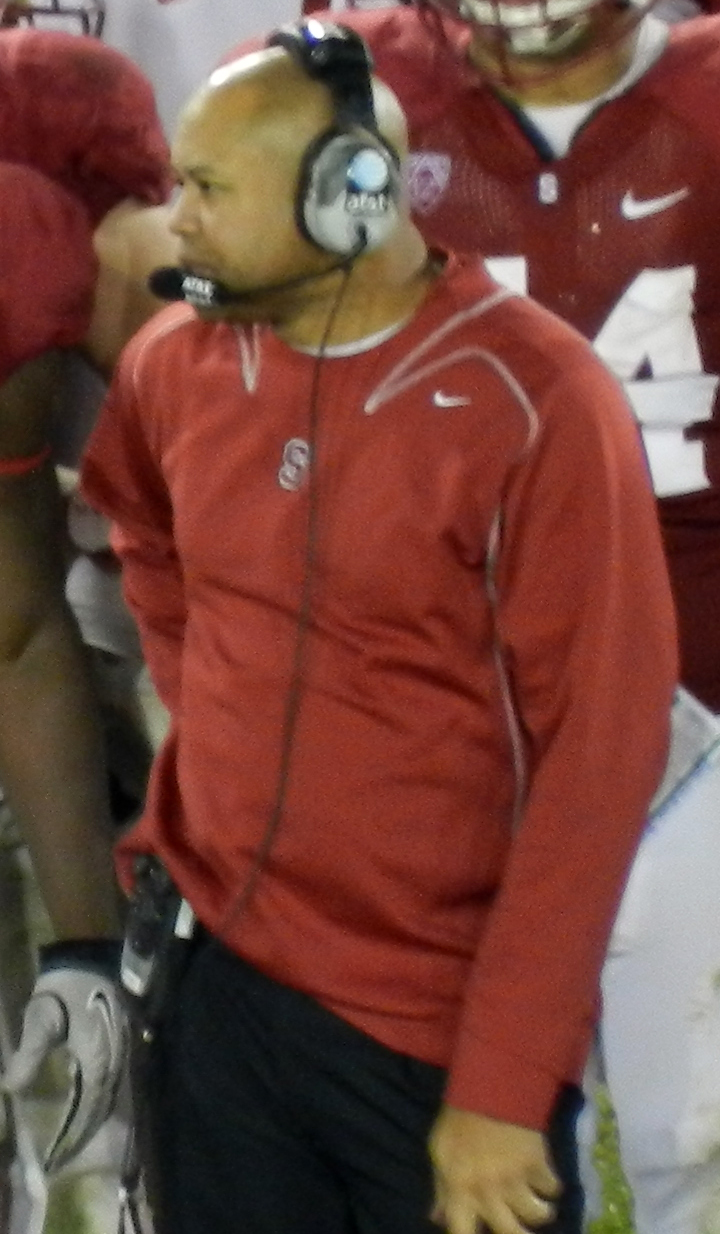
Stanford Cardinal football coach David Shaw

- David Shaw – Head coach
- Derek Mason – Associate head coach/co-defensive coordinator/defensive backs
- Pep Hamilton – Offensive coordinator/quarterbacks
- Jason Tarver – Co-defensive coordinator/inside linebackers
- Randy Hart – Defensive line
- Mike Bloomgren – Running game coordinator/offensive line
- Mike Sanford Jr. – Running backs
- Lance Anderson – Outside linebackers
- Brian Polian – Recruiting coordinator/special teams/safeties
- Ron crook – Tight ends/offensive tackles
- Shannon turley – Head strength coach
- Nick Holz – Offensive assistant
- Aaron Moorehead – Offensive assistant
- Morgan turner – Offensive assistant
- Chester McGlockton – Defensive assistant
- Tavita Pritchard – Defensive assistant
- Jordan sundheim – Graduate assistant

=== Roster ===
2011 Stanford Cardinal
Quarterbacks: 5 Evan Crower – Freshman; 6 Josh Nunes – (redshirt) Sophomore; 8 Kevin Hogan – Freshman; 10 David Olson – (redshirt) Freshman; 12 Andrew Luck – (redshirt) Junior; 16 Robbie Picazo – (redshirt) Sophomore; 19 Adam Brzeczek – Freshman; Running backs: 4 Michael Spanos – (redshirt) Sophomore; 22 Remound Wright – Freshman; 23 Jackson Cummings – (redshirt) Freshman; 25 Tyler Gaffney – Junior; 29 Andrew Stutz – (redshirt) Sophomore; 30 Ricky Seale – (redshirt) Freshman; 32 Anthony Wilkerson – Sophomore; 33 Stepfan Taylor – Junior; 34 Jeremy Stewart – (redshirt) Senior; 39 Kelsey Young – Freshman; Fullbacks: 10 Geoff Meinken – (redshirt) Sophomore; 36 Lee Ward – (redshirt) Freshman; 85 Ryan Hewitt – (redshirt) Sophomore; Centers: 61 Conor McFadden – (redshirt) Freshman; 64 Sam Schwartzstein – (redshirt) Junior; 65 Khalil Wilkes – (redshirt) Sophomore; Offensive guards: 50 Cole Underwood – (redshirt) Freshman; 52 David DeCastro – (redshirt) Junior; 63 Kevin Reihner – Freshman; 66 Matt Bentler – (redshirt) Senior; 75 Dillon Bonnell – (redshirt) Freshman; 76 Kevin Danser – (redshirt) Sophomore; Offensive tackles: 54 David Yankey – (redshirt) Freshman; 55 Jonathan Martin – (redshirt) Junior; 60 Brian Moran – Freshman; 73 Cameron Fleming – (redshirt) Freshman; 74 Brendon Austin – Freshman; 77 Tyler Mabry – (redshirt) Senior	Wide receivers: 2 Corey Gatewood – (redshirt) Senior; 4 Drew Terrell – Junior; 13 Rollins Stallworth – Freshman; 17 Griff Whalen – Senior; 18 Jeff Trojan – (redshirt) Freshman; 20 Keanu Nelson – (redshirt) Freshman; 21 Jamal-Rashad Patterson – Junior; 44 John Flacco – (redshirt) Freshman; 80 Sam Knapp – (redshirt) Sophomore; 81 Chris Owusu – Senior; 84 Jemari Roberts – (redshirt) Sophomore; 87 Jordan Pratt – Freshman; 88 Ty Montgomery – Freshman; 89 Devon Cajuste – Freshman; Tight ends: 9 Brandon Gottfried – (redshirt) Freshman; 11 Levine Toilolo – (redshirt) Sophomore; 46 Matt Kasner – Freshman; 82 Coby Fleener – (redshirt) Senior; 83 Davis Dudchock – (redshirt) Freshman; 86 Zach Ertz – (redshirt) Sophomore; Defensive tackles: 56 Jacob Gowan – (redshirt) Sophomore; 58 David Parry – (redshirt) Freshman; 72 J.B. Salem – Freshman; 95 Lance Callihan – Freshman; 97 Anthony Hayes – Freshman; 99 Terence Stephens – Junior; Defensive ends: 48 Kevin Anderson – Freshman; 49 Ben Gardner – (redshirt) Sophomore; 72 J.B. Salem – Freshman; 79 Alex Yazdi – Freshman; 90 Josh Mauro – (redshirt) Sophomore; 91 Henry Anderson – (redshirt) Freshman; 92 Charlie Hopkins – Freshman; 96 Eddie Plantaric – (redshirt) Freshman; 98 Matthew Masifilo – (redshirt) Senior	Linebackers: 7 Patrick Skov – Freshman; 9 James Vaughters – Freshman; 11 Shayne Skov – Junior; 17 A. J. Tarpley – (redshirt) Freshman; 35 Jarek Lancaster – (redshirt) Sophomore; 40 Joe Hemschoot – Freshman; 42 Alex Debniak – Junior; 43 Blake Lueders – Sophomore; 44 Chase Thomas – (redshirt) Junior; 50 Brent Etiz – (redshirt) Sophomore; 51 Sam Mercer – Freshman; 53 Torsten Rotto – Freshman; 57 Max Bergen – (redshirt) Senior; 93 Trent Murphy – (redshirt) Sophomore; Defensive backs: 2 Wayne Lyons – Freshman; 8 Jordan Richards – Freshman; 23 Ronnie Harris – Freshman; 38 Ra’Chard Pippins – Freshman; Cornerbacks: 6 Terrence Brown – (redshirt) Sophomore; 15 Usua Amanam – (redshirt) Sophomore; 24 Quinn Evans – (redshirt) Junior; 27 Johnson Bademosi – Senior; 28 Harold Bernard – (redshirt) Junior; 31 Barry Browning – Sophomore; 37 Chris Gaertner – (redshirt) Freshman; Safeties: 3 Michael Thomas – Senior; 5 Devon Carrington – Sophomore; 15 Brent Seals – (redshirt) Sophomore; 22 Kyle Olugbode – (redshirt) Freshman; 26 Delano Howell – Senior; 29 Ed Reynolds – Sophomore; 41 Cason Kynes – (redshirt) Sophomore; Kickers: 19 Jordan Williamson – (redshirt) Sophomore; 46 Eric Whitaker – (redshirt) Sophomore; 47 Juan Castellanos – (redshirt) Freshman; Punters: 14 Ben Rhyne – (redshirt) Freshman; 36 Daniel Zychlinski – (redshirt) Junior; 38 David Green – (redshirt) Senior; Long snappers: 45 Andrew Fowler – 6th year Senior; 62 Austin Tubbs – Freshman
Sources: 2011 Stanford Cardinal Football Media Guide, 2011 Stanford Cardinal Football Roster

== Statistics ==
=== Scores by quarter (all opponents) ===
	1	2	3	4	OT	2OT	3OT	Total
Stanford	88	163	144	144	7	7	8	561
All Opponents	28	96	50	94	10	7	0	285

==== Scores by quarter (Pac-12 opponents) ====
	1	2	3	4	OT	2OT	3OT	Total
Stanford	57	108	108	99	7	7	8	394
Pac-12 Opponents	28	62	43	66	7	7	0	213
