= Molski =

Molski (feminine: Molska) is a Polish surname. Notable people with the surname include:

- Eugeniusz Molski (born 1942), Polish artist, painter, and sculptor
- Jarek Molski, American disabled man
