= Macleans College =

Location
- 2 Macleans Road; Eastern Beach; Auckland 2012; New Zealand; 36.8833°S 174.9152°E

Information
- Type: State co-educational
- Motto: Virtue Mine Honour
- Established: 1980
- Ministry of Education Institution no.: 41
- Principal: Steven Hargreaves (2017 – present)
- Grades: Secondary
- Enrolment: 3,078 (July 2026)
- Socio-economic decile: 9Q
- Website: www.macleans.school.nz

Macleans College is a co-educational state secondary school located in Eastern Beach, Auckland, New Zealand. The school is named after the Scottish Maclean family who lived and farmed the land of the school and surrounding reserves, and the school emblem contains the castle from their family crest along with five waves which symbolise the seaside location of the school. Metro placed Macleans College as the number one Auckland high school in 2010 among those in the Cambridge International Examinations system. In 2014, Macleans College ranked 2nd nationally in the Cambridge International Examinations.

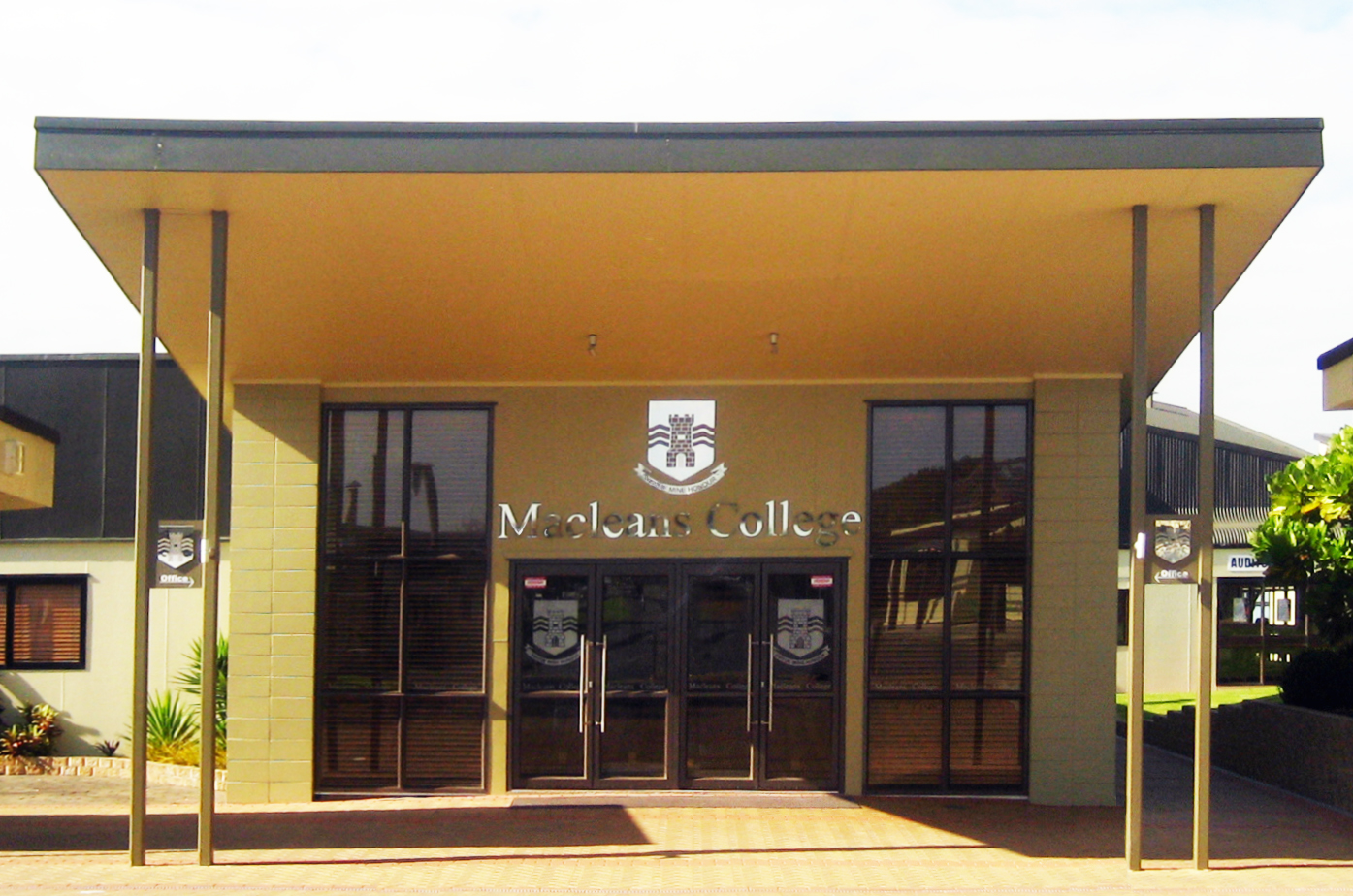
The front of the main office of Macleans college

== History ==
The school is named after the Maclean family. Robert and Every Maclean immigrated to New Zealand from Scotland. The family farmed the areas of land located in Howick that is the school's current location, as well as the surrounding government-controlled reserves.

The school was opened in 1980 by then Governor General Sir David Beattie with an initial roll of 199 students. The first principal was Colin Prentice, who later became director of World Vision in New Zealand, followed by his deputy Allan McDonald in 1989. In 2000, upon McDonald's retirement, Byron J. Bentley, became principal. Since 2018, upon Bentley's retirement, Steven Hargreaves became the new principal, and has been serving the school ever since.

In 2015, the school auditorium was renamed the 'Colin Prentice Auditorium' in honour of the late founding principal after his death. In 2017, Byron Bentley announced his retirement as principal. He stood as the longest-serving principal of the school, governing for 18 years. An official student publication "The Collegian" launched in 2018.

In 2021, the Crown handed over the land on which the school sat back to the local Māori iwi Ngāi Tai ki Tāmaki after they "exercised their option to purchase" as agreed to in the treaty of Treaty of Waitangi. The sale of the Macleans school site (land only) for $97 million NZD occurred on 30 March 2021. The Ministry of Education remains the owner of all school buildings on the land, and this would not change the school's day-to-day operations. The annual lease cost is about $6 million.

== House system ==
Upon admission, pupils are placed in one of the eight 'whanau houses', with the option to be with a sibling or family member, whether they are currently attending or a former student.

These houses are named after significant New Zealanders, and the traits and achievements of this person influence the house's environment, charity and what it encourages. The selection is random, unless the student has or had any sibling or parent attend the school, wherein the student has an option to be enrolled in the same house, or be randomly placed in any of the other seven.

The Whanau House system at Macleans divides the school into houses of about 300 students each, with two form classes of 30 or so students for each year level, with the exception of the house containing the accelerate class with 3 form classes, all from the same house. The 'whanau house' system had previously been trialled at Penrose High School (now One Tree Hill College) by modifying existing buildings, but Macleans College was the first state school in New Zealand to be purpose-built around the system. Recently, though, with the influx of new students, some houses have 3 form classes per year or more to accommodate the students.

House name	Named after	House mascot	House colour	Year opened	Service Aspect
Hillary	Sir Edmund Hillary	Yeti	Green	1980	Himalayan Trust
Kupe	Kupe	Kiwi	Yellow	1981	Kiwis for Kiwi
Rutherford	Sir Ernest Rutherford	Elephant	Red	1982	Hato Hone St John
Mansfield	Katherine Mansfield	'Dog' from Footrot Flats	Purple	1984	Guide dogs
Te Kanawa	Dame Kiri Te Kanawa	Taniwha	Dark Blue	1987	Child Cancer Foundation
Batten	Jean Batten	Buzzy Bee	Grey	1998	Westpac Rescue Helicopter
Snell	Sir Peter Snell	Black panther	Black	2001	Halberg Trust
Upham	Charles Upham	Lion	Light Blue	2003	RSA
TBC	TBC	TBC	Orange	2027	TBC

The original houses were Kupe, Hillary, Te Kanawa and Rutherford, although Hillary was rebuilt and reopened on 29 October 1992 after it burnt down on 13 October 1991. Mansfield House was hastily opened in 1984 due to a surge in the school's roll, the building itself was used earlier as temporary classrooms, having been airlifted via helicopter as prefabricated units. More houses have been added as the roll has increased, with the latest addition being Upham, which was opened in 2003.

== Setting and buildings ==
Macleans College is located in Macleans Park, the largest passive reserve in the Howick/Pakuranga district. Due to its sloping terrain, the school has wide views of the adjacent Eastern Beach, Waiheke Island, Motutapu Island, Motuihe Island, Rangitoto Island and the Coromandel Peninsula.

Each Whanau House has a one-storey building (with the exception of Batten, which has two due to being on a slope). This is due to a ban on buildings of over one storey in the whole Bucklands Beach-Eastern Beach area due to the scenery. Each house contains around 5 classrooms and 1 science lab, and sometimes a computer lab, and often several associated prefabs (Kupe, Mansfield, Te Kanawa, Batten). Each Whanau House building also has a large central indoor commons area, which, along with being a general-purpose socialising space, is used for house assemblies, lunch eating, and various co-curricular activities. Hillary, Kupe, Rutherford and Te Kanawa were built to a common design plan, known as the Whanau plan or S80 plan. Classroom blocks nearly identical to these were also built at Penrose High School and at Mountainview High School in Timaru. However, these buildings have since been rebuilt according to a new plan allowing for fewer classrooms and larger open commons spaces.

The school also contains specialised non-house associated Science, Technology, Computing, Graphics, Art, Music, and Engineering buildings, along with the large Barbara Kendall gymnasium, a large covered recreational area (The Macleans Cloud), and the Colin Prentice auditorium (named after Maclean's former principal) for productions and performance. Slightly north of the school, still located on the reserve, is the Macleans College Bentley Pavilion (named after former principal Byron Bentley), the Macleans College Hockey Turf, and the Macleans College Turf (used for football and rugby). To accommodate a growing student population, the school constructed the International Block, comprising a row of ten classrooms. Classrooms 1–5 were built in 2023 at the lower end of the Macleans Cloud, while Classrooms 6–10 were completed in 2024 adjacent to the gymnasium.

In July 2025, through the government's Budget 25 scheme, Macleans College received funding for 8 new classrooms to combat the growing population in the surrounding area. In November 2025, it was announced that Maclean's College would build a new ninth house.

== Students ==
=== Demographics ===
At the May 2014 Education Review Office (ERO) review of the school, Macleans College had 2271 students, not including 304 international students. Fifty-three per cent of students were male, and 47 per cent were female. The school had an Asian majority with 54 per cent of students identifying as such, including 31 per cent as Chinese and 11 per cent as Indian. Forty per cent of students identified as European, including 27 per cent as New Zealand European (Pākehā). Māori made up three percent and Pacific Islanders make up one percent of the roll.

As of 2026, Macleans College has an Equity Index of 385, placing it amongst schools whose students have the fewest socioeconomic barriers to achievement (roughly equivalent to deciles 9 and 10 under the former socio-economic decile system).

=== International students ===
The college's main foreign student demographic is Chinese in ethnicity, though other students from Germany, Hungary, Brazil, Japan, Nepal, etc. are also present.

== Qualifications and curriculum ==
=== Junior ===
Years 9 have six core subjects Physical education, Science, Maths, English, Māori Studies, and Social Studies. They have four classes each week, except for Māori studies and Physical Education, where they only have three.

Additionally, along with the core subjects students may pick 3 choice subjects one done along with Māori studies in one of the two semesters and another two done in the other semester (The accelerate class only picks 2 as they had a mandatory music class).

=== Senior ===
In 2013, 97.6 per cent of students leaving Macleans College held at least NCEA Level 1 or IGCSE, 95.5 per cent held at least NCEA Level 2 or AS, and 86.2 per cent held at least University Entrance standard. This is compared to 85.2%, 74.2%, and 49.0%, respectively, for all students nationally.

Until 2018, Macleans College offered both NCEA Level 1 and IGCSE in Year 11 as pathways into NCEA Level 2 and CIE AS Level. However, in response to external pressures and a commitment to better preparing students for their Year 12 and 13 examinations, the school made the decision to move away from these curricula. In their place, Macleans College developed the Maclean's Certification (MCERT). MCERT incorporates elements of both IGCSE and NCEA Level 1, providing students with a foundation for senior academic success.

== Notable alumni and staff ==
=== Sports ===
==== Athletics ====
- Kirsten Hellier – javelin, 1992 Olympics, 1990 and 1994 Commonwealth Games

==== Badminton ====
- Rhona Robertson – badminton, 1992 and 1996 Olympics

==== Baseball ====
- Scott Campbell – baseball, Minor league, Arizona Diamondbacks

==== Basketball ====
- Natalie Taylor – women's basketball, 2008 Olympics

==== Cricket ====
- Andrew de Boorder – cricketer, Auckland
- Derek de Boorder – cricketer, Auckland
- Brooke Walker – cricketer, New Zealand team
- Kyle Mills – cricketer, New Zealand team
- Ayaan Lambat – cricketer, New Zealand Women's U-19 team and Auckland Hearts

==== Football ====
- Sean Lovemore – football, Wellington Phoenix
- Nathan Walker – football, Wellington Phoenix

==== Figure Skating ====
- Dwayne Li – figure skating, 2024 Youth Olympics

==== Rugby ====
- Jarek Goebel – rugby, Auckland Blues

==== Swimming ====
- Corey Main – swimming, 2016 Olympics
- Danielle Asiata – swimming, 2023 Youth Commonwealth Games

==== Tennis ====
- Cameron Norrie – tennis, Achieved world ranking of No. 10 in April 2022

==== Triathlete ====
- Ryan Sissons – triathlete, 2012 Olympics

==== Wind-Surfing ====
- Aaron McIntosh – windsurfing, 1996 and 2000 Olympics
- Barbara Kendall – windsurfing, 1992, 1996, 2000, 2004 and 2008 Olympics; the Barbara Kendall school gymnasium is named after her

=== Music ===
- Dr Steve Miles (teacher) – euphonist, National Band of New Zealand, Brighouse & Rastrick, Black Dyke, Williams Fairey

=== Politics ===
- Kamahl Santamaria – journalist
- Ingrid Leary – Labour MP for Dunedin South, since 2020
- Nancy Lu – List MP for National Party

=== Business ===
- Mark Weldon – swimmer, 1992 Olympics, former CEO of the New Zealand Exchange (NZX) and MediaWorks New Zealand
- Colin Craig – businessman and founding leader of the Conservative Party of New Zealand
