= Gonciarz =

Gonciarz is a Polish surname. Notable people with the surname include:

- Jarosław Gonciarz (born 1970), Polish politician
- Krzysztof Gonciarz (born 1985), internet creator, filmmaker
