= Jason Tarver =

American football player and coach (born 1974)

Cleveland Browns
- Title: Run game coordinator/Linebackers coach

Personal information
- Born: August 28, 1974 (age 52); Stanford, California, U.S.

Career information
- Position: Defensive back
- College: Santa Clara University

Career history
- West Valley (1996–1997) Linebackers/defensive backs/special teams coach; UCLA (1998–2000) Graduate assistant; San Francisco 49ers (2001–2010); Offensive quality control coach (2001-2003); Assistant running backs coach (2004); Outside linebackers coach (2005-2010); Stanford (2011) Defensive coordinator & linebackers coach; Oakland Raiders (2012–2014) Defensive coordinator; San Francisco 49ers (2015–2017) Linebackers coach; Vanderbilt (2018–2019) Defensive coordinator & linebackers coach; Cleveland Browns (2020–present); Linebackers coach (2020–2025); Run game coordinator/linebackers coach (2026–present)
- Coaching profile at Pro Football Reference

Jason Tarver (born August 28, 1974) is an American football coach who is the linebackers coach for the Cleveland Browns of the National Football League (NFL). He previously served as an assistant coach for the San Francisco 49ers and Oakland Raiders. Tarver also coached at Vanderbilt, Stanford, UCLA and West Valley College.

== Early life and playing career ==
Tarver attended Foothill High School in Pleasanton, California and graduated in 1993. After graduating from high school, he attended Santa Clara University from 1992 to 1997. Since Santa Clara had cut their football team after the 1992 season, Tarver decided to play defensive back at West Valley College for the 1994–1995 seasons. He graduated from Santa Clara with a bachelor's degree in biochemistry in 1997. Tarver maintained a close relationship with West Valley's football program and advocated against the cutting of the school's football program, until it ultimately was cut in 2014.

== Coaching career ==
=== Early career ===
After his playing career ended, Tarver served as outside linebackers, defensive backs, and special teams coach at West Valley for the 1996 and 1997 seasons, and as a graduate assistant at UCLA for the 1998 through 2000 seasons, while pursuing his master's degree.

=== San Francisco 49ers ===
In 2001, Tarver was hired by the San Francisco 49ers as an offensive quality control coach. In 2004, he was promoted to assistant running backs coach. In 2005, Tarver was promoted to outside linebackers coach.

=== Stanford ===
In 2011, Tarver was named co-defensive coordinator on David Shaw's staff at Stanford.

=== Oakland Raiders ===
In February 2012, Tarver was hired by the Oakland Raiders as their defensive coordinator under head coach Dennis Allen. In Tarver's first season as Raiders defensive coordinator, the defense improved from 29th overall in 2011 to 18th in 2012. He made multiple media headlines in 2013, when, during a 21-18 Raiders win over the Steelers, cameras picked up Tarver yelling and making obscene gestures towards the referees after Oakland cornerback Mike Jenkins was flagged for hitting a defenseless receiver. He apologized after the incident, but was still later fined $15,000 by the Raiders for his actions.

=== San Francisco 49ers ===
In 2015, Tarver returned to the San Francisco 49ers and was hired as their linebackers coach under head coach Jim Tomsula. Tarver was retained under new head coach Chip Kelly in 2016.

=== Vanderbilt ===
In February 2018, it was announced that Tarver was hired as defensive coordinator under Vanderbilt Commodores head coach Derek Mason.

=== Cleveland Browns ===
On February 18, 2020, Tarver was hired by the Cleveland Browns as their linebackers coach under head coach Kevin Stefanski.

== Personal life ==
Tarver and his wife Katie have two sons, Merrick and Keegan. They currently live in Cleveland, but have a vacation home in California that they go to during the summer.
