= Jarosław (disambiguation) =

Jarosław is a town in Subcarpathian Voivodeship, Poland.

Jarosław may also refer to:

- Jarosław (given name), a given name (and list of people with the name)
- Jarosław, Lower Silesian Voivodeship (south-west Poland)
- Jarosław County
- Jarosławice, Lower Silesian Voivodeship (south-west Poland)
- Jarosław, West Pomeranian Voivodeship (north-west Poland)

== See also ==
- Jaroslav (disambiguation)
- Yaroslav (disambiguation)
