= Grzegorz Halama Oklasky =

Polish cabaret group

Grzegorz Halama Oklasky is Polish cabaret established in 1995 in Zielona Góra by Grzegorz Halama.

Cabaret actors include Grzegorz Halama and Jarosław Jaros. Former members of this cabaret include Marcel Chyrzyński and Marek Grabie.

== Awards and distinctions ==
1995

- Grand Prix - Lato Kabaretowe "Mulatka", Ełk
- I position - Przegląd Piosenki Kabaretowej OSPA
- Nagroda Specjalna Programu III Polskiego Radia
- Nagroda Radia Kielce
- I position - Festiwal PaKA w Krakowie
- II position - Festiwal Piosenki Studenckiej, Kraków
- I position - Przegląd Piosenki Studenckiej TARTAK, Warszawa

1996

- Award name Andrzej Waligórski - ANDRZEJ'96

1998

- I position on Rybnicka Jesień Kabaretowa - Ryjek

2003

- Grand Prix name professor Ludwik Sempoliński - IV Ogólnopolski Festiwal Sztuki Estradowej

2005

- Award from jury - VI Festiwal Dobrego Humoru, Gdańsk
- I position on Rybnicka Jesień Kabaretowa - Ryjek
