= Scott Campbell (baseball) =

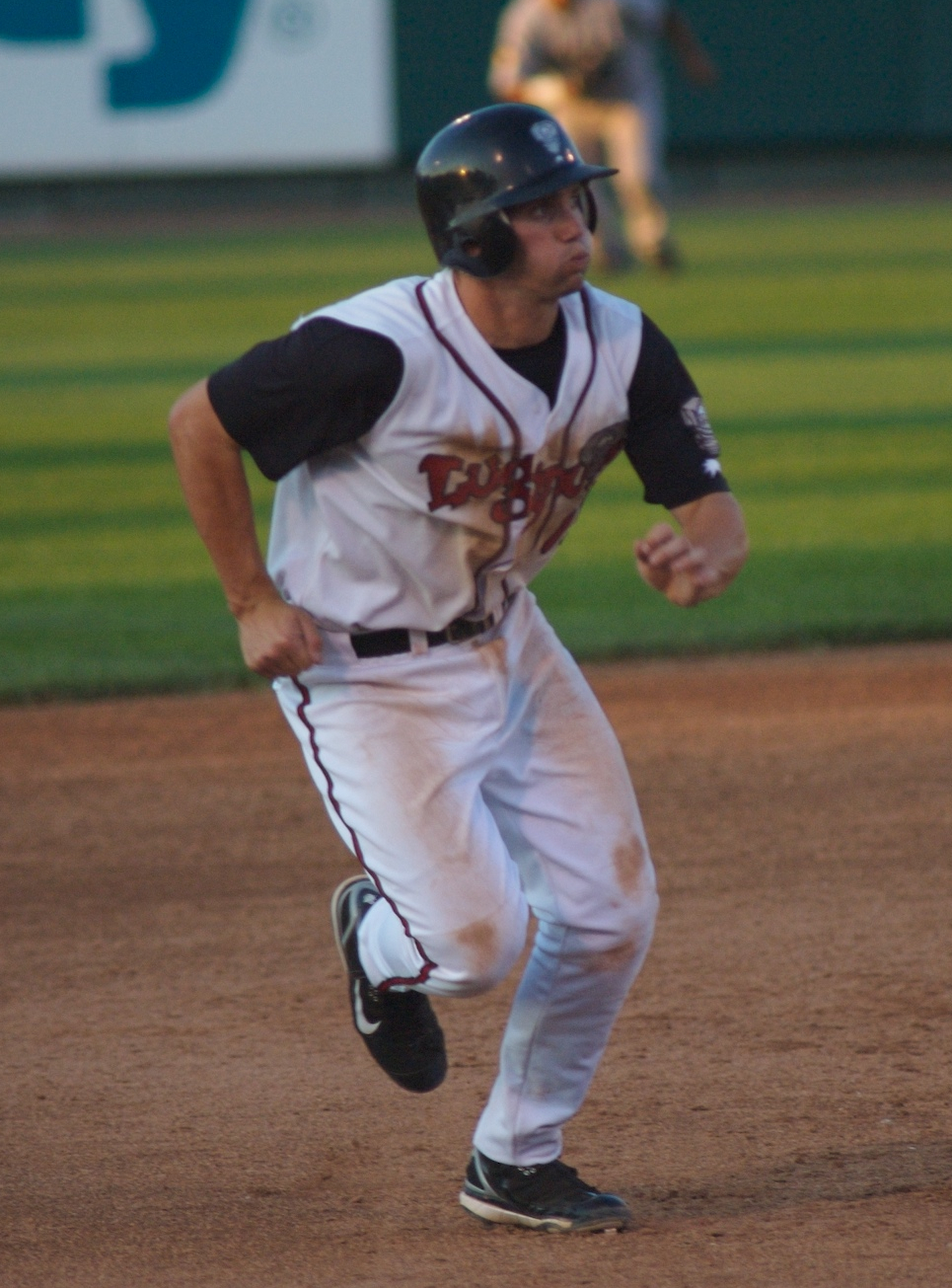
- Campbell as a member of the Class A Lansing Lugnuts of the Midwest League in 2007
- Infielder
- Born: 25 September 1984 (age 42); Auckland, New Zealand
- Bats: Left Throws: Right
- Stats at Baseball Reference

Scott Campbell (born 25 September 1984) is a retired Minor League Baseball infielder. In 2006, he was selected 300th overall by the Toronto Blue Jays. He retired on 15 March 2012 due to recurring injury problems in his hip.

He played college baseball at Gonzaga University. In 2007, Campbell played for the class-A affiliate of the Blue Jays, the Lansing Lugnuts. In 2007, he showed some promise as a hitter, hitting .279/.390/.397. However, he was not considered a top prospect of the Jays given his age and the level where he played. In 2008, Campbell had a breakout year, increasing his batting average to .341 and his OBP to .435 while moving up two levels to AA. He was chosen to represent the World team at the 2008 All-Star Futures Game. Given his reputation as a solid defensive second baseman, Campbell was once widely considered one of the better prospects in the Toronto Blue Jays minor league system, and had been compared to Chase Utley by Blue Jays General Manager J.P. Ricciardi.

== Early career ==
=== High school ===
Campbell got started on the sport when he was 9 after his mother signed him up after seeing an advertisement in a local newspaper and a year later was inspired to play baseball further after attending the World Children's Baseball Fair in Japan. He attended Macleans College in Auckland, there was no high school baseball in New Zealand so he played three years of football (or soccer) at Macleans as a member of New Zealand Olympic Youth Development Program for baseball in New Zealand and played for the New Zealand national baseball team while at high school.

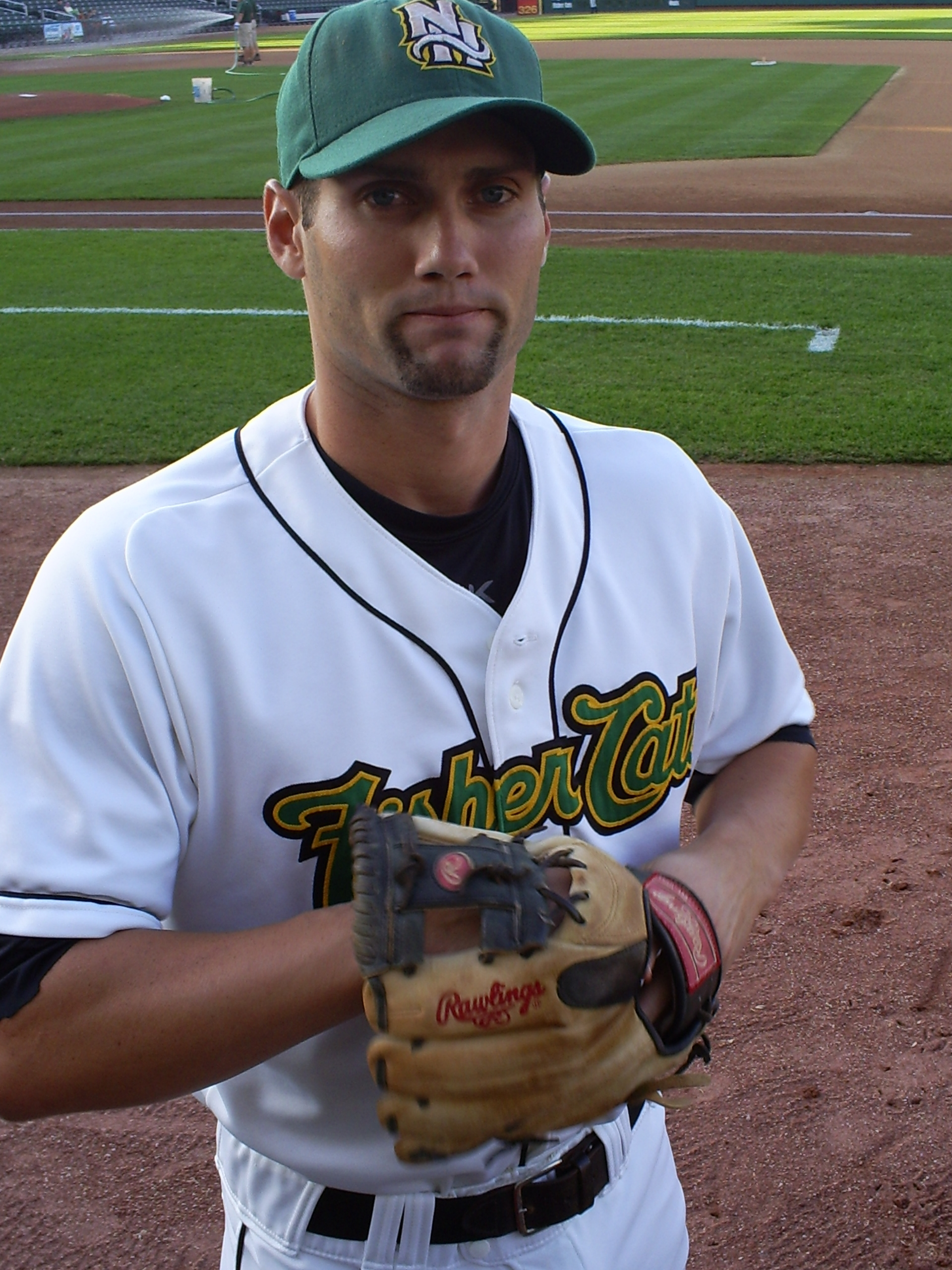
Scott Campbell while playing for the New Hampshire Fisher Cats

=== Central Arizona Community College ===
During his freshman year in 2004 he played at Central Arizona Community College, hitting .423 with 34 runs scored and 10 stolen bases. He earned his first-team All-Region I and National Junior College All American honors while leading the team to the Region I championship and runner-up finish at Western District championships.

During his sophomore year in 2005 he transferred to Gonzaga University, a private Catholic Jesuit university located in Spokane, Washington, United States. He played and started in all 54 games, posted a team-leading .332 batting average, while also tying for the team-lead with 70 hits, had 10 doubles, one triple, one home run and 30 RBI and posted 17 multi-hit games including a 4-for-5, two RBI and one double performance against Oklahoma in the Coca-Cola Spring Training Tournament.

== Professional career ==
In 2006, Campbell was drafted in the 10th round of the 2006 Major League Baseball draft by the Toronto Blue Jays as the 300th pick overall and signed a seven-year contract with the club. Campbell started his professional career playing in the New York–Penn League for the rest of 2006 with the Auburn Doubledays where he had a successful season, batting at .292 in 68 appearances.

The following year, Scott was promoted to class A in the Midwest League playing with the Lansing Lugnuts, but failed to be listed as an official top prospect during the season despite finishing the season batting at a respectable .279, having an on-base percentage of .390 and making the New York–Penn League all-star squad where he walked in two appearances.

Campbell continued to rise through the ranks, being promoted two levels to AA for 2008 where he played 112 games with the New Hampshire Fisher Cats as their starting second baseman. The year would prove to be a very successful one for Scott as he batted at a .302/.398/.427 clip and was selected in the World team for the 2008 All-Star Futures Game and the 2008 Eastern League all-star team.

2009 gave Campbell a taste of AAA where he played 27 games for the Las Vegas 51s towards the twilight of the season. He played the majority of his games in AA, where he batted .269.
