= Jarosław Jaros =

Polish cabaret actor

Jarosław Jaros (born 2 January 1978 in Zgorzelec) - Polish cabaret actor.

He performed with Grzegorz Halama at Grzegorz Halama Oklasky.

Currently he performs a program: Żule i bandziory.

In 1998 he initiated Kabaret Słuchajcie – a cabaret.

== Filmography ==
Movie director

- 2000 - Pizza country
- 2000 - ?
- 2000 - Paka jestem
- 2003 - Plica
- 2003 - Sklep

Scenario

- 2000 - Pizza country
- 2000 - Taka jestem

Photos

- 2000 - Pizza country
- 2000 - ?
- 2000 - Taka jestem
- 2003 - Kita
- 2003 - Szkoła
- 2003 - Małżonka

Movie editing

- 2000 - Pizza country
- 2000 - ?
- 2000 - Taka jestem
- 2003 - Małżonka

Actor

- 2000 - Taka jestem
- 2000 - Wizja - voice from heaven
- 2000 - Dwóch ludzi z szybą
- 2000 - Hormony
- 2000 - Oświadczyny
- 2001 - Senne marzenie
- 2003 - Baśń o ludziach stąd - as drunk man, driver
- 2003 - Ulica
- 2003 - Sklep

Dubbing

- 2007 - Było sobie porno - various voices

Postproduction

- 1999 - Dr Jekyll i Mr Hyde według Wytwórni A'YoY
