= Jarosław Gibas =

Polish sociologist and writer

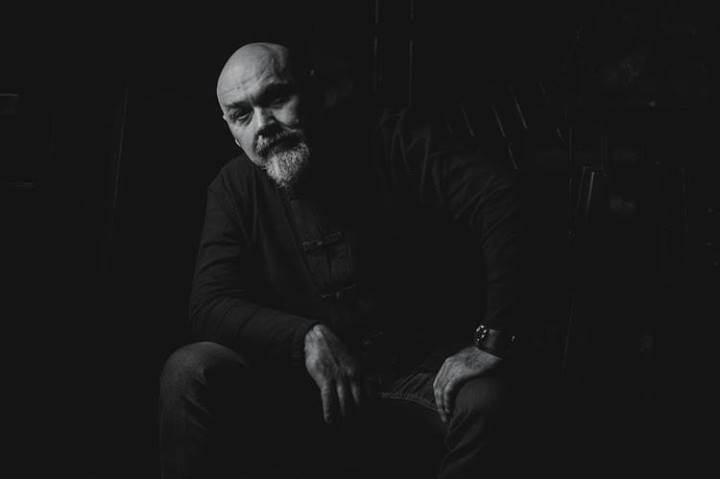
Jarosław Gibas

Jarosław Gibas (born 1967, Bytom) is a Polish novelist, sociologist, journalist and author of books about the psychology of personal development.

His debut novel The Nest of Angels was released in 1995 by Marabut Publishing House from Gdansk. Two years later Wydawnictwo Literackie from Kraków released his second novel, Salve Theatru. At the same time, as a culinary columnist, he was discovering the world of Silesian restaurants with his next book Mouth full of Silesia (Chorzow, Itatis, 2002) being the collection of his reviews. His articles were also published in the magazines like: FA-art, Opcje, List Oceaniczny, Kresy, Śląsk, NaGło’.

Between 1992 and 1996 he managed the "Stage" section of quarterly magazine Opcje. Between 2005 and 2007 he was editor-in-chief of Echo Miasta. Katowice; he was also editor-in-chief of Nowa Gazeta Slaska between 2011 and 2014.

He founded the Hereditas Silesiae Superioris Foundation. He also writes a blog called BigBiker.

== Bibliography ==
- The Nest of Angels, Gdańsk, Marabut Publishing House, 1995.
- Salve Theatrum, Kraków, Wydawnictwo Literackie, 1997.
- Mouth full of Silesia, Chorzów, Itatis, 2002.
- Holzok For President (serialized fiction), "Trybuna Śląska" 2005.
- Get Slim With Kaizen, Gliwice, Sensus Publishing House 2013.
- Beat Stress With Kaizen, Gliwice, Sensus Publishing House 2014.
- Life. Next Level. Transpersonal coaching, Gliwice, OnePress Publishing House 2015.
- Motorcyclism in your forties, Gliwice, Septem Publishing House 2015.
- Motorcyclism. Road to mindfulness, Gliwice, Sensus Publishing House 2016.

Other publications

- Catalaunian Plains [in:] Bytom. Antologia twórczości literackiej 1945–1995, WKUM Bytom, 1996,
- Mouth full culinary reviews, "Gazeta Wyborcza. Katowice", since 07.01.2000.
- Jarosław Gibas ocenia, culinary reviews, website nawidelcu.pl
- Gibas’ essays, "City Magazine", 2004.
- Armor-piercing Essays, "Trybuna Śląska", 2004–2005.
- Armor-piercing Essays, "Echo Miasta. Katowice", since 18.09.2005

== General references ==
- Manfred Mack, Polnishe literatur im gespräch II. Anthologien., Deutsches Polen Institut, 1996
- Jan Tomkowski, Literatura Polska, PIW, 1997.
- Jerzy Jarzębski, Apetyt na Przemianę, Znak, 1997.
- Krzysztof Uniłowski, Skądinąd, Wydawnictwo FA-art, 1998 za: "Twórczość" nr 5, 1996.
- pod red. Aliny Brodzkiej i Lidii Burskiej, Sporne sprawy polskiej literatury współczesnej, IBL, 1998.
- Jan Tomkowski, Dwadzieścia lat z literaturą 1977–1996, PIW, 1998.
- Krzysztof Varga, Paweł Dunin-Wąsowicz, Parnas Bis. Słownik literatury polskiej urodzonej po 1960 roku, Warszawa: Lampa i Iskra Boża, 1995.
- Jan Tomkowski, Literatura Polska, Wydanie poszerzone, PIW, 2004
