= Jarosław Leitgeber =

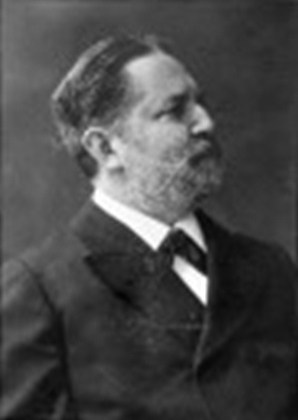
- Born: 18 November 1848
- Died: 22 May 1933
- Occupation: Writer, bookseller
- Language: Polish

Jarosław Saturnin Leitgeber (18 November 1848 - 22 May 1933) was a Polish writer, bookseller and publisher. His brother, also a book bookseller and publisher, Mieczysław Antoni Leitgeber, inspired his career. Jarosław got his experience by working with his brother, interrupted only by military service in 1869.

A year later, in 1870 he traveled to Lipsk to learn book printing at Baer and Hermann Publishing. He returned to Poznań in 1873 and opened his own book printing company using his father's inheritance. Leitgeber's most successful periodical was Kalendarz Poznański published continuously from 1873 till 1901 and replaced with the new Nowy Kalendarz Poznanski published for the next 30 years. Jarosław Leitgeber wrote books, especially historical for teenagers, under the alias "Jan Tworzymir".

Leitgeber made his living as the bookseller from 1866 till the end of his life and owned a bookstore in Poznań by his own name. From 1876 to 1903 he ran a printing house. Since 1873 he was publishing Kalendarz Poznański. From 1910-18 he was a chairman of Association of Polish Booksellers in Germany (Związek Księgarzy Polskich na Rzeszę Niemiecką).

== Selected publications ==
- Katalog książek polskich teologicznych i religijnych, 1873
- Legendy różnych autorów: zebrał dla ludu i młodzieży, 1889
- Podarek dziatkom ku nauce i rozrywce, 1900
- Z różnych lat: obrazki i opowiadania na tle dziejów naszych, 1904
- Z dziejów handlu i kupiectwa poznańskiego, 1929, 1934
- Sześćdziesięciolecie pracy zawodowej, 1927

== Sources ==
- Google Books, inauthor: Jarosław Leitgeber (about 37 results)
- "Leitgeber Jarosław". Wielkopolski Słownik Biograficzny (in Polish). Warszawa-Poznań: Państwowe Wydawnictwo Naukowe. 1981. pp. 409–410. ISBN 83-01-02722-3.
- Wyciąg z kroniki rodziny Leitgeber (in Polish).
- Leitgeber, Sławomir (2002). Dzieje rodziny Leitgeberów od XVIII do XX wieku. Wydawnictwo Historyczne.
- Sobkowiak, Walerian (1972). "Leitgber Jarosław Saturnin". Polski Słownik Biograficzny. Vol. 17. Polska Akademia Nauk & Polska Akademia Umiejętności. pp. 10–11.
