= Jarosław Kozakiewicz =

Polish artist (born 1961)

Jarosław Kozakiewicz (born 1961) is a Polish artist who works at the intersection of art, science and architecture. The inspirations for his artistic-architectural projects include contemporary ecology, genetics, physics, astronomy and ancient cosmological concepts which relate microcosm with macrocosm. Identifying an analogy between the human body and the natural world, Kozakiewicz questions the anthropometrical character of Vitruvian man as the traditional paradigm of architecture. Instead, he proposes an organic paradigm, a `geometry of the inside´.

== Biography ==
Kozakiewicz was born in Bialystok (Eastern Poland) in 1961. He studied at the Warsaw Academy of Fine Arts (Sculpture Department) and the Cooper Union for Advancement of Science and Art in New York, in the class of Nicky Logis and Hans Haacke. Originally trained as a sculptor he turned his attention to architecture, urbanism and science in the mid-nineties.

In 2006 Kozakiewicz represented Poland at the Venice Biennale of Architecture. Some of his projects have received prices in architectural competitions. He received an honourable mention, for instance, in a competition for the design of the Centre of Contemporary Art in Toruń (2004) and in 2005, his entry won in international competition for the Park of Reconciliation near the Auschwitz-Birkenau Museum. In 2005 Kozakiewicz’s Project Mars, a massive redesign of the landscape of a former lignite-mining area near Lake Baerwalde in Germany, won an open competition and was completed in 2007.

== Work ==
Initially, Kozakiewicz's search took place in the field of traditional sculpture, but at the end of the 90. his interests started to focus increasingly on the social, ecological and symbolic dimensions of the public space, especially urban architecture. His quest has led him to utopian and critical architectural and environmental art projects.

Jarosław Kozakiewicz's projects constitute an attempt to solving the problem of reintegrating the human being within his surroundings - the natural environment. They often use symbolic forms, quite frequently referring to the human body. This approach brings to mind, above all, the eighteenth-century architecture parlante, but at the same time, they constitute an aspect of contemporary ecological thought.

Kozakiewicz searches for geometrical equivalents of the ways the human bodily presence manifests itself in the world, that is the sphere of physical contact and communication between bodies. Using the language of architecture, he strives to express proximity, distance, bodily experience of the other, and contact with non-human bodies. This search is best evident in his design for Tower of Love (2004) – a challenge to civilizational processes that eliminate the body from social life. Kozakiewicz's organic buildings catch the eye. Behind his utopian architecture, for which nature carves out the structural parameters, is more than a desire to improve quality of life in the city; it also takes into account a possible urbanistic context. Examples might be Tower of Love (2004), the Oxygen Towers (2005) shaped like human lungs or Transfer (2006), presented at the 11. Architecture Biennale in Venice. Some of the artist's designs are practically ecological manifestos.

== Selected public space projects ==
=== Project Mars, earth sculpture, 18 x 350 x 250 m, Boxberg, Germany ===
1st prize in the international open competition

Mars serves as a place of relaxation, excursions, and various cultural activities, such as summer cinema or small-scale concerts. The grass-covered giant auricle is blending in almost perfectly with the surroundings. The monumental scale makes it possible to challenge the traditional relationship between the work of art and the viewer. Mars isn’t an object that we can take in with a single view and admire from a distance, but rather a place that we experience “from the inside,” such as by participating in the activities it offers. Project Mars is also subordinated to the rhythm of nature, in the same way the natural landscape features are, and its appearance depend on the changing seasons. Thus the artificial and man-made is integrally connected to the natural.

=== Park of Reconciliation of the Nations ===
1st prize in the international open competition– under realization

In 2005, Kozakiewicz’s design of the Park of Reconciliation of Nations won the first award in an open competition to revitalise an area on the right bank of the river Soła, near the Auschwitz-Birkenau State Museum. The design proposed by the artist (with irregular paths inspired by the veins of poplar leaves, a popular tree in this area) meant a radical move away from the geometry of straight lines; it was a symbolic gesture aiming to negate the horribly clear geometric layout of the former death camp. According to the plan’s requirements Kozakiewicz’s design sought to create a park that would be available not only to the visitors of the Auschwitz museum but also to the local population. The result was a public park, located in the direct vicinity of a place charged with historical memory, which would not only integrate itself with the existing ecosystem but also address the needs of the residents of the town Oświęcim. The artist faced a particularly daunting task, that of reviving the space of a park located near a former death camp.

The pedestrian-only Bridge of Ghosts, one of the symbolic elements of the Park, is an extension of a street called Kamieniec which runs alongside the camp site. The 200 metre-long wooden bridge over the Soła connects the Museum with the park. Its form has been derived from a plane corresponding in width with Kamieniec Street, twisted 180 degrees around its own axis; it is a sort of stretched Moebius strip. In the bridges lower part a corridor has been gouged out that changes into a tunnel. Looking at the bridge from the South, we will see the pedestrians disappearing in the tunnel. They will re-emerge a moment later. The Bridge of Ghosts is a reference to the archetypal rites of passage, from death to life, from life to death.

=== Aquaporin (fountain, Copernicus Science Centre, Warsaw, 2015) ===
Kozakiewicz’s work looks for analogies between the functions of the human body and the world of nature – he sees the human body as a closed ecosystem on a small scale. He has returned on these fields of interest in Aquaporin, a combined water sculpture installation and fountain which is a metaphor for life. The Artist stresses that his intention in placing the fountain next to the Copernicus Science Centre was to remind visitors and pedestrians that science gives us hope of maintaining life on this planet. The fountain is 4,5 meter high and made of nine ribbons twisted in various fashions made of a carbon/epoxy composite. The ribbons are 10–40 cm wide and the water is sprayed through three nozzles, which symbolize the construction of a water particle.

== Selected books and articles ==
- Jarosław Kozakiewicz. Transfer, Exhibition in the Polish Pavilion at the 10th International Architecture Exhibition in Venice, Zachęta National Gallery of Art, Warsaw 2006, ISBN 83 89145 55 3
- Cathryn Drake, Architecture-Looking Back, "Frieze", Issue 112, January–February 2008
- Cathryn Drake, Ear to the Ground, "Metropolis", February 2008
- Clare Dowdy, Bartosz Haduch, Michał Haduch, Architecture overview: Poland, "Wallpapper", Sept.2008;
- Angela Maria Piga, "L'Orecchio venuto da Marte", Specchio+, Roma, January 2009;
- Massimiliano Fuksas, Ai confini dei sensi, "L'espresso", 26.11.2009
- Going aerial. Air, art, architecture, edited by Monika Bakke, Jan van Eyck Academe, Maastricht, 2006, p. 89-91
- Gabriela Świtek, Project Mars: the nature of macroanthropos, "The Journal of Architecture", Volume 11/ Number 4, RIBA, London, 2006, p. 485-496
- Monika Bakke, Intimate Bodies of the Solar System, in Analecta Husserliana LXXIII, Kluwer Academic Publisher, 2001, ISBN 978-0-7923-7032-1, p. 63–71

== See also ==
- List of Polish sculptors
- European Landart Network / Jarosław Kozakiewicz
