= Grzegorz Halama =

Polish parodist, and cabaret actor (born 1970)

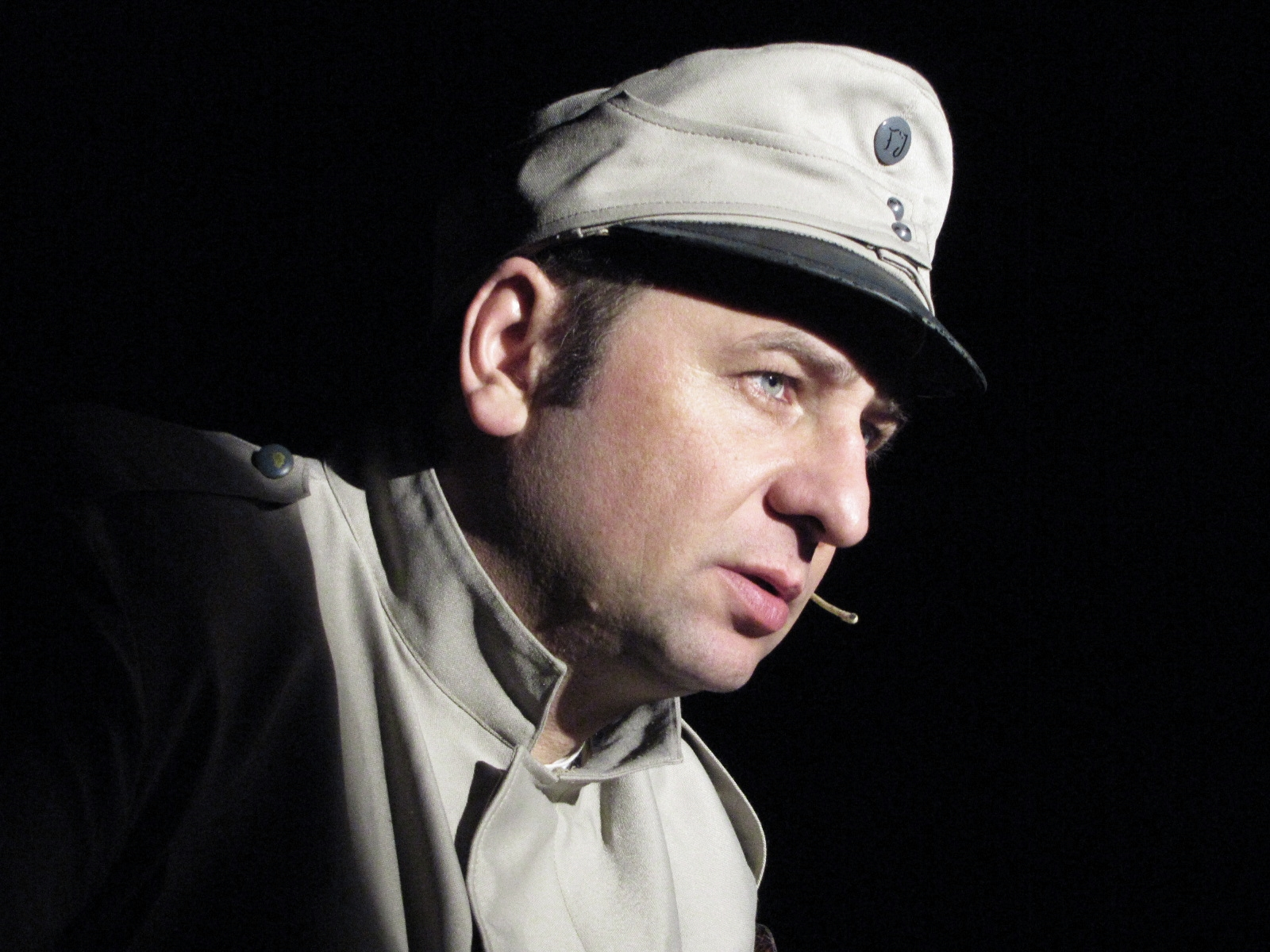
Grzegorz Halama

Grzegorz Piotr Halama (born 2 January 1970 in Świdwin) is a Polish parodist, and cabaret actor. In 1995 he initiated Grzegorz Halama Oklasky, a Polish cabaret. He is a graduate of technikum elektryczno-elektroniczne (Electrical-electronic Technical College) and actor study L'Art Studio in Kraków.

== Actor merchandise ==
=== Movies ===
- 1997: Robin Hood - czwarta strzała – rich person
- 1999: Sprawa honoru
- 1999: Dr Jekyll i mr Hyde według wytwórni A'Yoy – man in cabaret "Biedronka"
- 2000: Umiesz tak?
- 2000: W obronie kobiety
- 2002: Nakręceni – Bogdan
- 2002: Taki los
- 2005: Kolska
- 2008: Nie kłam kochanie - Iza's Husband
- 2009: Gwiazdy w czerni - astronomer
- 2010: Polskie gówno - Czesław Skandal

=== TV Theaters ===
- 2003: Pielgrzymi – driver

=== Dubbing ===
- 2004: RRRrrrr!!! – Zapowiadacz Nocy
- 2005: Emilia - narrator
- 2007: 7 krasnoludków: Las to za mało - historia jeszcze prawdziwsza – dwarf Knedel
- 2007: Było sobie porno – various voices

=== Series ===
- 2005–2009: Niania - pharmacist (episode 86 Wszystko zostaje w rodzinie, episode Teges-smeges (first episode of season 9), episode 103 Pechowa wysypka)
- 2008–2009: 39 i pół - valet (season 2, episode 11)
- 2010: Na dobre i na złe - hospitably, various roles: patient; policeman
- Spadkobiercy
- Since 13 March 2010: Tylko nas dwoje (Polish version of Just The Two of Us)

=== Movie director ===
- 1999: Archetypowy ojciec
- 1999: Sprawa honoru
- 2000: Umiesz tak?
- 2002: Hepi Lord
- 2002: Taki los
- 2002: Igry nocne
- 2002: Choroba

=== Scenarist ===
- 1999: Sprawa honoru
- 1999: Archetypowy ojciec
- 2000: Umiesz tak?

=== Photos ===
- 2000: Umiesz tak?

=== Film editing ===
- 2000: Umiesz tak?

=== TV programs ===
- 2007–2008 Clever - widzisz i wiesz - professor
- Tylko nas dwoje

=== Parody songs ===
- Śpiworki (from this songs there is well-known citation in Polish: Ja wiedziałem, że tak będzie)

=== Radio programs ===
- Żule i bandziory - with Jarosław Jaros, in radio Trójka, every week at 8.48 in program Urywki Z Rozrywki. He plays Pan Józek, chickens breeder from Chociule.

== Personal life ==
Halama's girlfriend is Jania Dobosz. Earlier Grzegorz Halama was with his wife Dorota Halama, but they separated.

Grzegorz Halama has 2 children, daughter Anna and son Piotr.
