= Jarek Lancaster =

American football player (born 1990)

No. 35
- Position: Linebacker

Personal information
- Born: March 24, 1990 (age 36); Moreno Valley, California, U.S.
- Listed height: 6 ft 1 in (1.85 m)
- Listed weight: 236 lb (107 kg)

Career information
- High school: Sandra Day O'Connor High School
- College: Stanford University (2009–2014)

Awards and highlights
- Pac-12 Champion (2012, 2013)
- Stats at ESPN

Jarek Alexander Lancaster (born March 24, 1990) is an American former football linebacker for the Stanford Cardinal.

== Early life ==
Lancaster attended the Sandra Day O'Connor High School in Helotes, TX, where he played defensive end, linebacker and quarterback. He recorded 157 tackles (51 solo) and 6.5 sacks in his career and also completed 60 of 115 passing for 1,087 yards and 10 TD as a senior quarterback, where he was named All-District 28-5A second team as a senior. He was named the Nation's 53rd best linebacker by Scout.com. He also lettered in track and field (hurdles, Long jump, Triple jump and mile relay).

== College career ==
Lancaster completed his career at Stanford playing in 54 straight games with 146 tackles (93 solo) and 6.5 sacks. He came to Stanford in the class of 2009 as a Safety, but was moved to Linebacker after he grew during his Red-Shirt year. His most notable season came as a sophomore in 2011, while replacing injured Shayne Skov, Lancaster started 10 games, leading the team in tackles with 70 (44 solo) for the #7 ranked Cardinal, punctuated by a 7 tackle performance in a Fiesta Bowl loss to Oklahoma State. In his career at Stanford, Lancaster was twice named as the recipient of the Phil Moffat Award, awarded to the team's Outstanding Special Teams Player of the Year.

Statistics
Season	Tackles	Assist	Total	Sack	Pass def	Fumble rec
2010	10	5	15	0.0	0	0
2011	44	26	70	3.5	3	1
2012	23	13	36	2.0	0	0
2013	16	9	25	1.0	0	1
TOTALS	93	53	146	6.5	3	2

== Personal ==
Jarek is the nephew of Sacha Lancaster, a former NFL Europe, CFL and AFL defensive end.

As of 2023, Lancaster lives in San Antonio, Texas, and has worked as a teacher, football coach, and administrator in San Antonio's Northside Independent School District.
