= Jarosław Paśnik =

Polish footballer (born 1983)

Personal information
- Date of birth: 19 February 1983 (age 43)
- Place of birth: Garwolin, Poland
- Height: 1.91 m (6 ft 3 in)
- Position: Goalkeeper

Youth career
- Promnik Łaskarzew

Senior career*
Years	Team	Apps	(Gls)
2001–2002	MG MZKS Kozienice		
2002–2003	Zryw Sobolew		
2003	MG MZKS Kozienice		
2004–2005	Polonia Warsaw	0	(0)
2005–2006	Ruch Chorzów	27	(0)
2007	Znicz Pruszków		
2008	Radomiak Radom	7	(0)
2008–2010	Promnik Łaskarzew		
2010	Pogoń Siedlce	8	(0)
2011	Orzeł Unin		
2012–2019	Promnik Łaskarzew		
- * Club domestic league appearances and goals

Jarosław Paśnik (born 19 February 1983) was a Polish former professional footballer who played as a goalkeeper.

== Early life ==
Pasnik was born in Garwolin, Poland. He played for MG MZKS Kozienice, Zryw Sobolew, Polonia Warsaw, Ruch Chorzow, Znicz Pruszkow, Radomiak Radom, Pronik Laskarzew, Pogori Siedice, Orel Unin and Promnik Laskarzew clubs. His most appearances, 27, were for Ruch Chorzow club.
