= Jarosław Ambroziak =

Polish association football player

Personal information
- Full name: Jarosław Ambroziak
- Date of birth: 8 July 1962 (age 64)
- Place of birth: Gdynia, Poland
- Height: 1.80 m (5 ft 11 in)
- Position: Defender

Senior career*
Years	Team	Apps	(Gls)
1980–1985	Stoczniowiec Gdańsk		
1986–1987	Lechia Gdańsk	24	(0)
1988–1989	VfL Herzlake	4	(0)
- * Club domestic league appearances and goals

Jarosław Ambroziak (born 8 July 1962) is a Polish former professional footballer who played as a defender. He made 24 Polish top division appearances with Lechia Gdańsk.

== Career ==
Ambroziak began his career playing with Stoczniowiec Gdańsk in the III liga, then the third tier of Polish football. During his time with Stoczniowiec, the club finished runners up of the III liga twice, failing in each occasion to be promoted to the II liga via the playoffs.

After five seasons with Stoczniowiec, he joined city rivals Lechia Gdańsk, who were playing in the I liga, Poland's highest division at the time. He made his I liga and Lechia debut on 3 August 1986, starting the match as Lechia would lose to Zagłębie Lubin. Playing in the top division for the first time, and with Lechia struggling throughout the season, Ambroziak became known as a hard hitting defender, being the most carded player in the Lechia team during the 1986–87 season. Lechia finished the season in the relegation playoffs, facing Ruch Chorzów in the match to decide who the final relegated team was to be. Lechia won the match 2–1, and Ambroziak was once again booked in the match. After his first season with Lechia, Ambroziak made only 4 more appearances for the club before being released during the winter break.

Ambroziak joined newly promoted German team VfL Herzlake in the Oberliga North for the 1988–89 season. He made 4 league appearances for Herzlake as they finished in a respectable 10th place. After the season, Ambroziak retired from professional football.

== Honours ==
Stoczniowiec Gdańsk

- III liga, group II runner-up: 1982–83, 1984–85
