= Jarosław Tkocz =

Polish footballer

Personal information
- Date of birth: 25 February 1973 (age 53)
- Place of birth: Rybnik, Poland
- Height: 1.83 m (6 ft 0 in)
- Position: Goalkeeper

Senior career*
| Years | Team | Apps | (Gls) |
| 1989–1992 | Energetyk ROW Rybnik | | |
| 1992–1997 | Naprzód Rydułtowy | | |
| 1997–2003 | GKS Katowice | 65 | (0) |
| 2004–2005 | Shinnik Yaroslavl | 9 | (0) |
| 2006 | Ural Yekaterinburg | 11 | (0) |

Managerial career
- 2007–2009: GKS Katowice (goalkeeping coach)
- 2010–2013: Górnik Zabrze (goalkeeping coach)
- 2013–2018: Poland (goalkeeping coach)
- 2018–2019: Lech Poznań (goalkeeping coach)
- 2020–2021: Jagiellonia Białystok (goalkeeping coach)
- 2021–2022: Raków Częstochowa (goalkeeping coach)
- 2022–2023: Korona Kielce (goalkeeping coach)
- 2023–2024: Al-Okhdood (goalkeeping coach)
- 2025: Motor Lublin (goalkeeping coach)
- * Club domestic league appearances and goals

Jarosław Tkocz (born 25 February 1973 in Rybnik) is a Polish former professional footballer who played as a goalkeeper. He was most recently the goalkeeping coach of Ekstraklasa club Motor Lublin.

His son Maksymilian is also a professional footballer.
