= Jarek Kupsc =

American film director

Jarosław "Jarek" Kupść (born December 26, 1966) is a Polish-American film director, screen writer, and actor.

== Early life and education ==
He started shooting films at the age of sixteen in his native Poland. In 1985, he left Poland for Greece, where he studied Byzantine icon painting and worked as a freelance cartoonist. He emigrated to the United States in 1987 and became a naturalized citizen in 1992. He graduated from San Francisco State University in 1995 with a degree in writing/directing, while also pursuing a career as a graphic artist. In 1998, Kupść wrote and illustrated a film history book, The History of Cinema for Beginners.

== Film career ==
Kupść made his directorial debut with Recoil which was awarded Best Feature Film at Woodstock Film Festival in 2001. He followed with a road movie in 2006 titled Slumberland which won the Special Jury Prize at the Gdynia Film Festival

His 2008 feature, The Reflecting Pool, was one of the first narrative films dealing with the investigation of the September 11th attacks,

After returning to Poland in 2010, he wrote and directed Kliny (Wedges) and began his association with the Warsaw Film School in Warsaw, Poland, where he teaches at the international department. His last film to date is the award-winning Quintuplets, shot on a mobile phone.

Jarek Kupść' film and art essays have been published by Little White Lies, Cineaste and other magazines.

== Selected filmography ==
Year	Title	Role	Awards
2019	Quintuplets	Director, Screenwriter, Producer, Cinematographer (as Yaro Ghillis)	Best Feature Film – SmartFone3 Film Festival, Best Mobile Film, Best Actor – L'Âge d'or International Arthouse FF, Best Mobile Film, Best Director – Tagore International FF
2015	Kliny	Director, Screenwriter, Producer, Cinematographer	
2008	The Reflecting Pool	Director, Screenwriter	Columbine Award, Moondance Film Festival; Special Jury Prize, Polish Film Festival in America (Chicago)
2006	Slumberland	Director, Screenwriter, Producer	Special Jury Prize, Gdynia Film Festival; Young Screenwriter, YFF
2001	Recoil	Director, Screenwriter, Producer	Best Feature Film, Woodstock Film Festival; Best First Feature, Wine Country Film Festival; Best First Feature, Dahlonega Film Festival
1995	Dog	Director, Screenwriter, Cinematographer	Rosebud Award for Best Student Film, CSA Film Festival
