= Jarosław Pacoń =

Polish footballer (1972–2021)

Personal information
- Full name: Jarosław Bogdan Pacoń
- Date of birth: 8 January 1972
- Place of birth: Braniewo, Olsztyn Voivodeship, Poland
- Date of death: 13 November 2021 (aged 49)
- Place of death: Stamford, Connecticut, U.S.
- Height: 1.78 m (5 ft 10 in)
- Position: Defender

Youth career
- Stal Gorzyce

Senior career*
Years	Team	Apps	(Gls)
1990–1991	Stal Gorzyce		
1993–1994	Stal Stalowa Wola	10	(0)
1995	KSZO Ostrowiec Świętokrzyski		
1996	Stal Stalowa Wola		
1997–1999	Korona Kielce		
2000–2001	Olympia Stamford SC		
- * Club domestic league appearances and goals

Jarosław Bogdan Pacoń (8 January 1972 – 13 November 2021) was a Polish footballer who played as a defender.

== Club career ==
Pacoń started his career with Stal Gorzyce in 1990. In the 1993–94 Ekstraklasa season, he played 10 games for Stal Stalowa Wola. He also played for KSZO Ostrowiec Świętokrzyski and Korona Kielce where he was widely regarded as one of the best second division defenders. He ended his career at the American Olympia Stamford SC.

== Retirement and death ==
After retirement he stayed in the USA and ran a construction company. He died on 13 November 2021 in Stamford at the age of 49. He was buried on 23 November 2021 at the Spring Grove Cemetery, with a prior Mass for the deceased at the Holy Name of Jesus Church.
