= Shayne Skov =

American football player (born 1990)

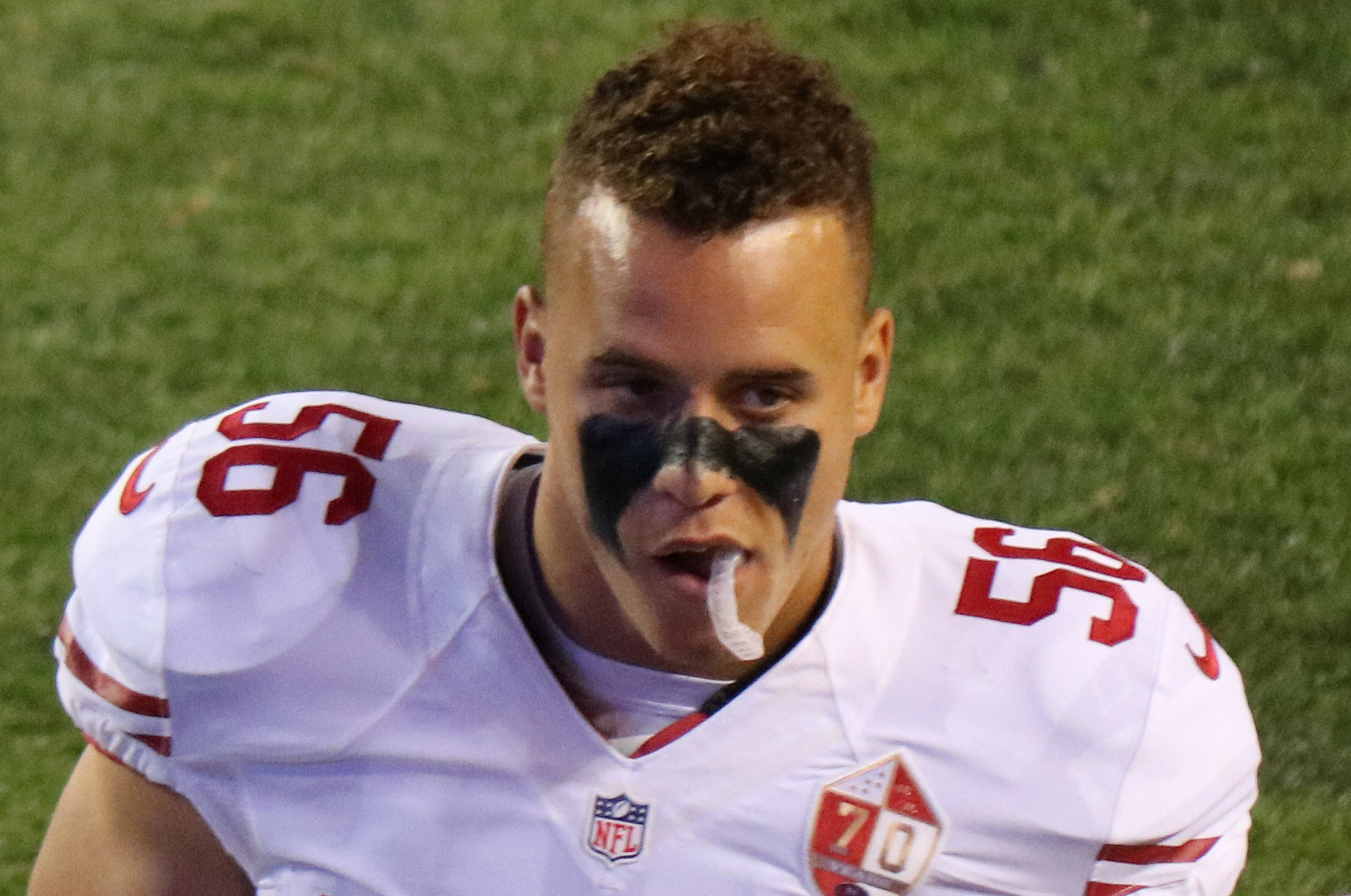
- Skov with the San Francisco 49ers in 2016

No. 56
- Position: Linebacker

Personal information
- Born: July 9, 1990 (age 36); San Francisco, California, U.S.
- Listed height: 6 ft 3 in (1.91 m)
- Listed weight: 247 lb (112 kg)

Career information
- High school: Pawling (NY) Trinity-Pawling
- College: Stanford
- NFL draft: 2014: undrafted

Career history
- San Francisco 49ers (2014)*; Tampa Bay Buccaneers (2014)*; San Francisco 49ers (2014–2016); New Orleans Saints (2017–2018)*
- * Offseason or practice squad member only

Awards and highlights
- First-team All-Pac-12 (2013)

Career NFL statistics
- Total tackles: 12
- Stats at Pro Football Reference

Shayne Miller Skov (born July 9, 1990) is an American former professional football player who was a linebacker for the San Francisco 49ers of the National Football League (NFL). He played college football for the Stanford Cardinal.

== Early life ==
Skov was born in San Francisco, California to Peter Skov, a white American, and Terri Skov, an African American.

His mother was diagnosed with multiple sclerosis and as a result the Skov family moved to Guadalajara, Jalisco for its mild climate and affordable healthcare. Shayne and his brother Patrick first began playing football in a team named Carneros de Guadalajara. He is a naturalized citizen of Mexico.

== High school ==
Skov attended the Trinity-Pawling School in Pawling, New York. He helped Trinity-Pawling to Erickson Conference and New England Prep titles as a senior, and was named 2008 Erickson Conference Player of the Year. He recorded 61 tackles (42 solo) as a senior. He also lettered in basketball and track and field. He participated in the 2009 U.S. Army All-American Bowl in San Antonio, Texas, where he recorded seven tackles including three for loss. Considered a four-star recruit by Rivals.com, he was rated as the 3rd best inside linebacker prospect in the nation. He committed to Stanford over offers from Duke, Boston College and Northwestern.

== College career ==
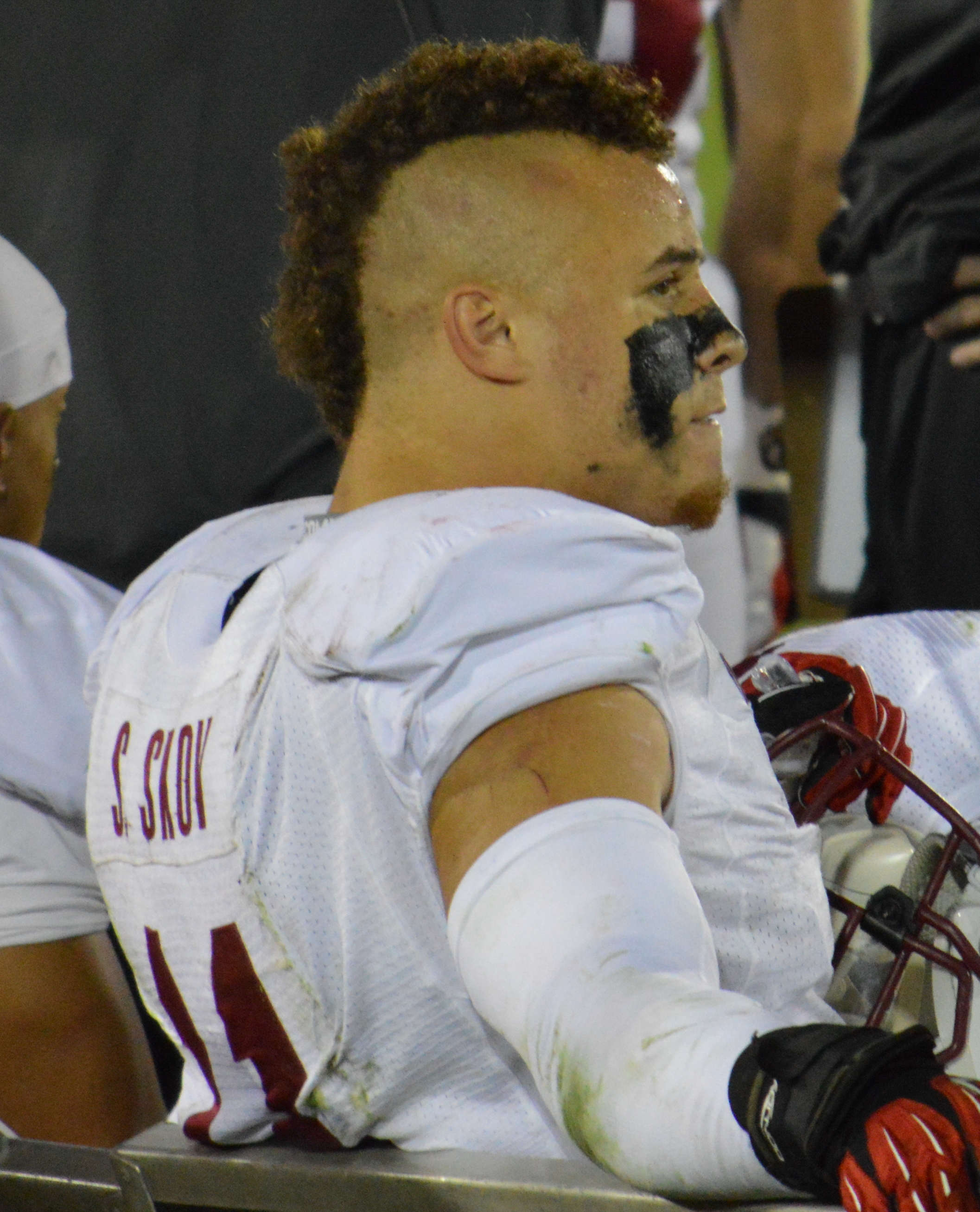
Skov in 2013

As a freshman in 2009, he appeared in all 13 games, making seven starts at outside linebacker. He finished third in the team in tackles with 62, including three for loss. As a sophomore, he went on to being named a conference honorable mention after recording 84 tackles (50 solo), including 10.5 for a loss, 7.5 sacks, two forced fumbles and five pass break ups. His season was highlighted by a 12 tackle, 3 sack performance against Virginia Tech in the 2011 Orange Bowl. In his junior season, he suffered a season-ending injury against Arizona in Week 3, but allowed him to be granted a medical redshirt. He finished the season with 19 tackles, including five for loss and one and a half sacks. In 2012, after missing the season opener against San Jose State for a DUI during the off-season, he started in 13 games, recording 81 tackles, including nine tackles for loss and 2.5 sacks and was named a conference honorable mention. In his final season, he went on to set a career high in tackles (109), tackles for loss (13), sacks (5.5) and forced fumbles (3). He was named a third-team All-American by the Associated Press.

== Professional career ==
=== San Francisco 49ers ===
Skov signed with the San Francisco 49ers as an undrafted free agent. He was released during final roster cuts, but re-signed to their practice squad on August 30, 2014.

=== Tampa Bay Buccaneers ===
After being released again in September, he was signed to the Tampa Bay Buccaneers practice squad on September 24, 2014, and re-signed with the team in October.

=== Second stint with the 49ers ===
On January 9, 2015, Skov signed a reserve/futures contract. He was waived on December 5, 2015. On December 8, 2015, Skov was re-signed by the 49ers.

On September 3, 2016, Skov was released by the 49ers as part of final roster cuts. The next day, he was signed to the 49ers' practice squad. He was promoted to the active roster on September 21, 2016. He was placed on injured reserve on November 29, 2016, after suffering a knee injury in Week 12.

On May 2, 2017, Skov was waived by the 49ers. He was re-signed on August 17, 2017, only to be waived on September 1.

=== New Orleans Saints ===
On October 10, 2017, Skov was signed to the New Orleans Saints' practice squad. He signed a reserve/future contract with the Saints on January 16, 2018. He was waived by the Saints on May 7, 2018.
