= Jarek Molski =

- Occupation: Disability rights activist
- Known for: Filing hundreds of lawsuits against small businesses for violations of the Americans with Disabilities Act

Jarek Molski is a disabled man known for filing hundreds of lawsuits against small businesses for violations of the Americans with Disabilities Act (ADA). Since a 1985 motorcycle accident that left him paralyzed, Molski has filed over 400 lawsuits against California small businesses due to lack of handicap parking, misplaced handrails, and other ADA violations.

Molski has received heavy criticism over his lawsuits. In 2004, a federal judge accused Molski of extortion, calling him a "hit-and-run plaintiff", and barred him from filing further lawsuits. Molski appealed the judge's order to the United States Supreme Court, but was denied after they refused to hear his case.

== Lawsuits ==
All of Molski's lawsuits have been exclusive to small businesses for violating the Americans with Disabilities Act. Of them, only one went to a trial, while the rest have been settled out of court. San Francisco attorney, Tom Frankovich, has represented Molski in 232 of his cases. Frankovich is estimated to have earned over $10 million from Molski's cases.

== Criticism and impact ==
Molski's lawsuits have sparked debates on the balance between disability rights and potential abuse of the legal system. Critics argue that Molski has exploited the ADA to file frivolous lawsuits for personal gain, while others maintain that he has brought attention to the accessibility issues faced by people with disabilities.

The criticism surrounding Molski's lawsuits has led to calls for ADA reform to prevent similar tactics in the future. Some of these proposed changes include imposing stricter standards for ADA lawsuits, requiring plaintiffs to give businesses a reasonable opportunity to address violations before filing a lawsuit, and limiting attorneys' fees in such cases.

Despite the controversy, Molski's lawsuits have led to increased awareness of ADA compliance issues among small businesses. Many businesses have taken steps to improve their accessibility, either as a result of being sued by Molski or to avoid similar lawsuits.
