= Jarek Goebel =

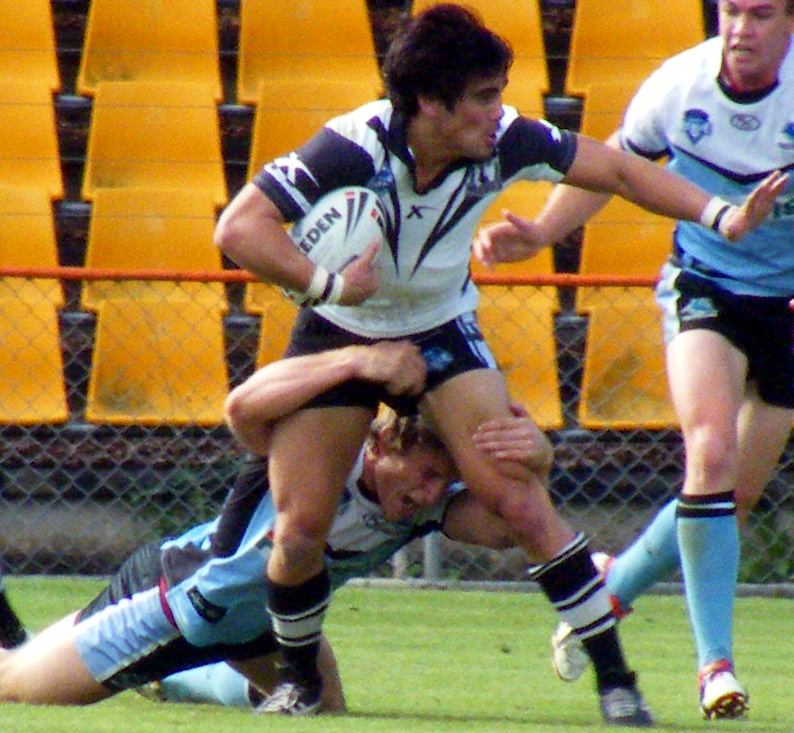
- Born: Jarek Goebel; 13 February 1985 (age 41) New Zealand
- Height: 186 cm (6 ft 1 in)
- Weight: 90 kg (14 st 2 lb)

Rugby union career
- Position: Wing/Fullback
Senior career
Years	Team	Apps	(Points)
2008	Auckland	4	(25)

Jarek Goebel is a New Zealand Rugby league footballer who plays for the Shellharbour Sharks in the Bundaberg Red Cup. He was previously a rugby union player who played provincial rugby for Auckland in the Air New Zealand Cup.

== Auckland ==
Goebel played in Auckland for club side University, and he was named in the 2008 Auckland side for the Air New Zealand Cup.
