= Jarosław Gonciarz =

Polish politician (born 1970)

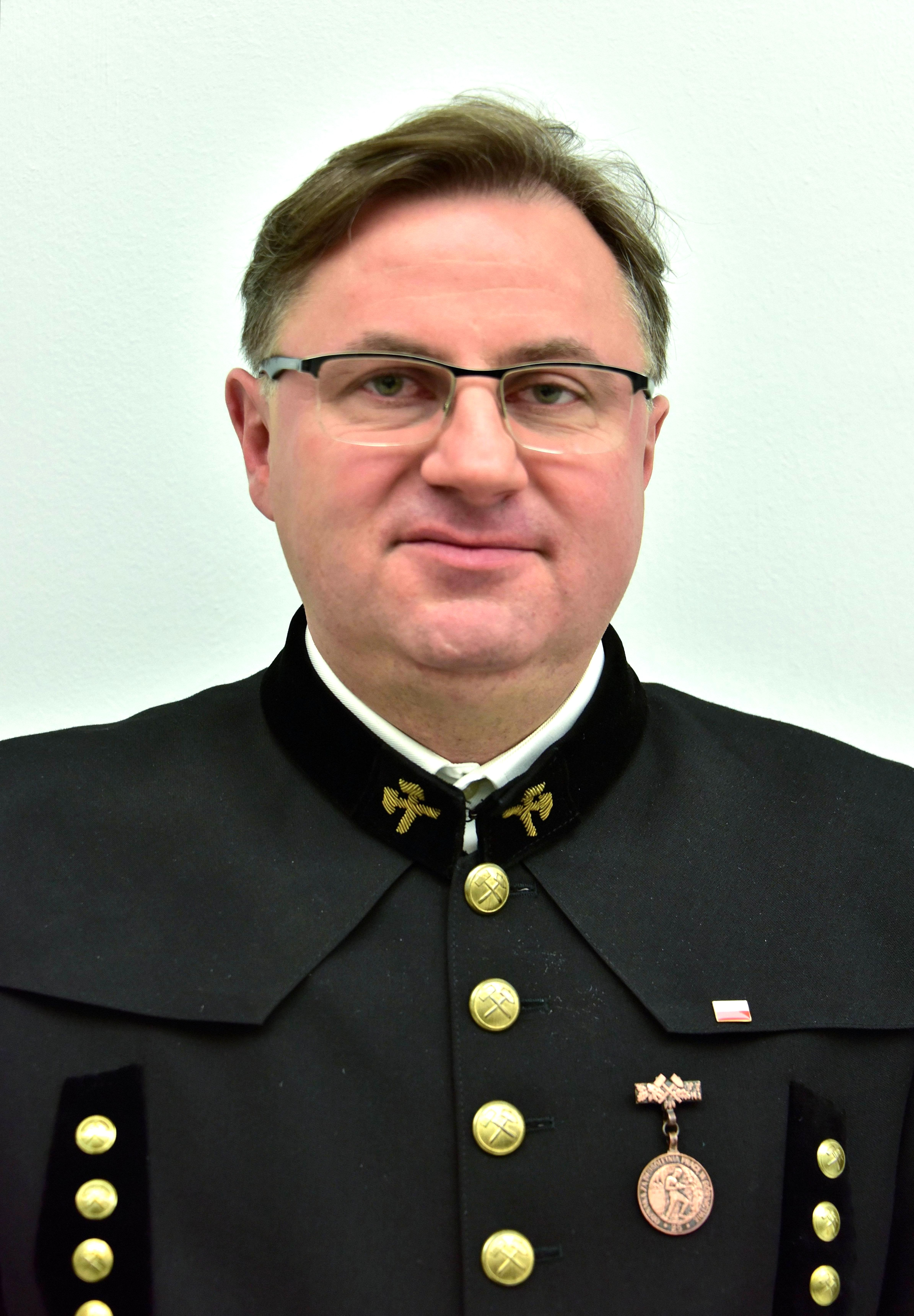
Jarosław Gonciarz

Jarosław Włodzimierz Gonciarz (born 28 August 1970 in Czeladź) – is a Polish politician, member of the VIII and IX Sejm from Law and Justice.
