= Yaroslav =

Slavic masculine given name

- Gender: masculine
- Language: Russian, Ukrainian

Origin
- Language: Slavic
- Origin: jar ("strong, fierce") + slav ("glory, fame")
- Region of origin: Eastern Europe

Other names
- Alternative spelling: Ярослав
- Related names: Jaroslav, Jarosław

Yaroslav (Cyrillic: Ярослав) is a Slavic masculine given name. It is composed of the Slavic elements jar meaning "strong, fierce" and slav meaning "glory, fame".

The transliteration Yaroslav is used in Ukrainian and Russian names. The name is equivalent to the Czech and Slovak name Jaroslav and the Polish name Jarosław.

The feminine form of the name is Yaroslava. Surnames derived from the name is Yaroslavsky and its variants. East Slavic patronymics are Yaroslavovich and Yaroslavich (masculine) and Yaroslavovna and Yaroslavna (feminine).

== Notable people with the name ==
=== Royalty and nobility ===
- Yaroslav I the Wise (c. 978–1054), Grand Prince of Kiev, later King Jaroslav I of Kiev
- Yaroslav II of Kiev (died 1180), Grand Prince of Kiev
- Yaroslav II of Vladimir (1191–1246), Grand Prince of Vladimir
- Yaroslav II Vsevolodovich (1139–1198), Prince of Ropesk, Starodub and Chernigov
- Yaroslav of Tver (1230–1271), sometimes called Yaroslav III, Prince of Tver and Grand Prince of Vladimir
- Yaroslav Osmomysl (c. 1135–1187), medieval ruler in the Kievan Rus
- Yaroslav Sviatopolkovich (1070s–1124), Prince of Volhynia

=== A-J ===
- Yaroslav Aguiar (born 1985), Angolan handball player
- Yaroslav Alshevsky (born 1991), Russian ice hockey player
- Yaroslav Amosov (born 1993), Ukrainian mixed martial artist
- Yaroslav Antonov (born 1963), Russian volleyball player
- Yaroslav Arbuzov (born 2004), Russian footballer
- Yaroslav Askarov (born 2002), Russian ice hockey player
- Yaroslav Belousov (born 1991), Russian student and activist
- Yaroslav Blanter (born 1967), Russian physicist
- Yaroslav Bohunov (born 1993), Ukrainian footballer
- Yaroslav Boyko (born 1970), Russian actor
- Yaroslav Brisiuck (born 1975), Ukrainian diplomat
- Yaroslav Cherstvy (born 1933), Russian rower
- Yaroslav Chupris (born 1981), Belarusian ice hockey player
- Yaroslav Dashkevych (1926–2010), Ukrainian historian and archaeographer
- Yaroslav Deda (born 1999), Ukrainian footballer
- Yaroslav Demin (born 2005), Russian tennis player
- Yaroslav Derega (born 1956), Ukrainian sinologist and linguist
- Yaroslav Dmytruk (born 1964), Ukrainian footballer
- Yaroslav Dobrokhotov (born 2000), Ukrainian footballer
- Yaroslav Dronov (born 1991), known by his stage name Shaman, Russian singer-songwriter and music producer
- Yaroslav Dubnevych (born 1969), Ukrainian politician
- Yaroslav Dumanskyi (1959–2021), Ukrainian footballer
- Yaroslav Dyblenko (born 1993), Russian ice hockey player
- Yaroslav Egerev (born 1990), Russian badminton player
- Yaroslav Filchakov (born 1995), Ukrainian Greco-Roman wrestler
- Yaroslav Gladyshev (born 2003), Russian footballer
- Yaroslav Golovanov (1932–2003), Russian journalist and writer
- Yaroslav Halan (1902–1949), Ukrainian writer, playwright, and publicist
- Yaroslav Halenko (born 1991), Ukrainian footballer
- Yaroslav Hodzyur (born 1985), Ukrainian-Russian footballer
- Yaroslav Horak (1927–2020), Australian illustrator and comics artist
- Yaroslav Hrytsak (born 1960), Ukrainian historian and university professor
- Yaroslav Hunka (born 1925), Ukrainian-Canadian soldier
- Yaroslav Iosseliani (1912–1978), Georgian Soviet Navy submarine commander
- Yaroslav Ivakin (born 1998), Russian footballer

=== K-P ===
- Yaroslav Karabin (born 2002), Ukrainian footballer
- Yaroslav Kendzior (born 1941), Ukrainian journalist, human rights activist and politician
- Yaroslav Khabarov (born 1989), Russian ice hockey player
- Yaroslav Kharitonskiy (born 1985), former Russian footballer
- Yaroslav Khartsyz (born 1997), Ukrainian boxer
- Yaroslav Khoma (born 1974), Ukrainian footballer
- Yaroslav Kinash (born 1988), Ukrainian footballer
- Yaroslav Komzyuk (born 1970), Ukrainian football player and coach
- Yaroslav Korolev (born 1987), Russian basketball player
- Yaroslav Kosov (born 1993), Russian ice hockey player
- Yaroslav Kotlyarov (born 1997), Ukrainian footballer
- Yaroslav Koval (1908–1997), Ukrainian photographer
- Yaroslav Krashevsky (born 2004), Russian footballer
- Yaroslav Krestovsky (1925–2003), Soviet Russian painter
- Yaroslav Krushelnitskiy (born 1983), Uzbekistani footballer
- Yaroslav Kutsyaba (born 1989), Ukrainian footballer
- Yaroslav Kuzminov (born 1957), Russian economist
- Yaroslav Kvasov (born 1992), Ukrainian footballer
- Yaroslav Lahuta (born 1975), Ukrainian politician
- Yaroslav Lavreniuk (born 2007), Ukrainian skeleton racer
- Yaroslav Lesiv (1945–1991), Ukrainian poet, priest
- Yaroslav Levchenko (born 1987), Russian artist
- Yaroslav Lopatynskyi (1906–1981), Soviet mathematician
- Yaroslav Makushinsky (born 1998), Belarusian footballer
- Yaroslav Markevych (born 1973), Ukrainian politician and businessman
- Yaroslav Martynyuk (born 1989), Ukrainian footballer
- Yaroslav Maslennikov (born 1982), Belarusian ice hockey player
- Yaroslav Matviyenko (born 1998), Russian footballer
- Yaroslav Melnyk (philologist) (born 1960), Ukrainian philologist and linguist
- Yaroslav Melnyk (born 1959), Ukrainian-Lithuanian novelist, philosopher, and literary critic
- Yaroslav Mendus (born 1960), Ukrainian politician
- Yaroslav Meykher (born 2000), Ukrainian footballer
- Yaroslav Mikhaylov born 2003), Russian footballer
- Yaroslav Minkin (born 1984), Ukrainian poet and cultural activist
- Yaroslav Mogutin (born 1974), Russian artist and author
- Yaroslav Moskalenko (born 1975), Ukrainian politician
- Yaroslav Moskalik (1966–2025), Russian army general
- Yaroslav Oliinyk (born 1991), Ukrainian footballer
- Yaroslav Omelyan (1929–2025), Ukrainian artist
- Yaroslav Onyshchuk (born 1967), Ukrainian archaeologist and historian
- Yaroslav Oreshkevich (born 2000), Belarusian footballer
- Yaroslav Oros (born 1959), Ukrainian writer and journalist
- Yaroslav Ovsyannikov (born 1993), Russian footballer
- Yaroslav Paniot (born 1997), Ukrainian-American figure skater
- Yaroslav Pasternak (1892–1969), Ukrainian archaeologist
- Yaroslav Pastukhov (born 1990), Ukrainian-Canadian author and drug smuggler
- Yaroslav Pavulyak (1948–2010), Ukrainian poet
- Yaroslav Plechiy (born 1999), Ukrainian footballer
- Yaroslav Podlesnykh (born 1994), Russian volleyball player
- Yaroslav Popovych (born 1980), Ukrainian cyclist
- Yaroslav Potapov (born 1999), Russian swimmer
- Yaroslav Pryriz (born 1963), Ukrainian bishop
- Yaroslav Pstrak (1878–1916), Ukrainian painter, illustrator and graphic artist

=== R-Z ===
- Yaroslav Rakitskyi (born 1989), Ukrainian footballer
- Yaroslav Rushchyshyn (1967–2025), Ukrainian businessman and politician
- Yaroslav Rybakov (born 1980), retired Russian high jumper
- Yaroslav Samofalov (born 1995), Ukrainian boxer
- Yaroslav Samylin (born 1997), Russian politician
- Yaroslav Senyshyn (born 1950), Canadian pianist, author and university professor
- Yaroslav Serdyuk (born 1990), Ukrainian footballer
- Yaroslav Shkurko (born 1991), Belarusian footballer
- Yaroslav Smelyakov (1913–1972), Russian poet
- Yaroslav Solonynko (born 1991), Ukrainian footballer
- Yaroslav Starobogatov (1932–2004), Russian zoologist
- Yaroslav Startsev (born 1988), Russian sport shooter
- Yaroslav Stetsko (1912–1986), Ukrainian politician
- Yaroslav Sukhyi (born 1951), Ukrainian politician
- Yaroslav Sverdlov (born 1968), Belarusian footballer
- Yaroslav Svorak (born 1989), Ukrainian footballer
- Yaroslav Sydorenko (born 1998), Ukrainian footballer
- Yaroslav Tkach (born 2001), Ukrainian speed climber
- Yaroslav Trofimov (born 1969), Ukrainian-Italian author and journalist
- Yaroslav Vatamanyuk (born 1963), Ukrainian footballer
- Yaroslav Vazhynskyi (born 1994), Ukrainian footballer
- Yaroslav Veselaho (born 2005), Ukrainian racing driver
- Yaroslav Voronkov (born 2003), Russian footballer
- Yaroslav Vynokur (born 1974), Ukrainian billiards player
- Yaroslav Vyshnyak (born 1982), Ukrainian football player and coach
- Yaroslav Yampol (born 1990), Ukrainian footballer
- Yaroslav Yanushevych (born 1978), Ukrainian economist and civil servant
- Yaroslav Yaroslavenko (1880–1958), Ukrainian composer
- Yaroslav Yarotsky (born 1996), Belarusian footballer
- Yaroslav Yeremenko (born 1989), Ukrainian DJ and music producer
- Yaroslav Yevdokimov (1946–2025), Russian singer
- Yaroslav Yurchyshyn (born 1980), Ukrainian politician
- Yaroslav Zakharevych (born 1989), Ukrainian footballer
- Yaroslav Zayats (born 1960), Ukrainian footballer
- Yaroslav Zdyrko (born 1987), Ukrainian footballer
- Yaroslav Zheleznyak (born 1989), Ukrainian economist and politician
- Yaroslav Zherebukh (born 1993), Ukrainian-American chess player
- Yaroslav Zhmudenko (born 1988), Ukrainian table tennis player
- Yaroslav Zinchenko (born 1987), Ukrainian chess player

== See also ==
- Yarko, diminutive form of the name
- Yaroslava, female form of the name
- Jaroslav, Czech and Slovak name
- Jarosław (given name), Polish name
- Yaroslavsky (disambiguation)
- Yaroslavl (inhabited locality)
