= Levchenko =

Levchenko (Ukrainian: Левченко; Belarusian: Леўчанка, Leuchanka, Leŭčanka) is a surname of Ukrainian origin. It derives from the personal name Levko. The surname, Levchenko, was created by adding the Ukrainian patronimic suffix, -enko, meaning someone of Levko, usually the son of Levko.

== People ==
- Anatoli Levchenko (1941–1988), Soviet-Ukrainian cosmonaut
- Andriy Levchenko (born 1985), Ukrainian volleyball player
- Gordey Levchenko (1897–1981), Soviet naval commander and admiral
- Ihor Levchenko (born 1991), Ukrainian footballer
- Irina Levchenko (1924–1973), Russian tank commander
- Kseniia Levchenko (born 1996), Russian basketball player
- Nadezhda Levchenko (born 1931), Soviet sprint canoer
- Sergey Levchenko (born 1953), Russian politician
- Serhiy Levchenko (1981–2007), Ukrainian footballer
- Stanislav Levchenko (born 1941), Russian KGB major and defector to the United States
- Vitaliy Levchenko (born 1972), Tajik-Ukrainian footballer
- Volodymyr Levchenko (1944–2006), Soviet-Ukrainian footballer
- Yuliya Levchenko (born 1997), Ukrainian high jumper
- Yaroslav Levchenko (born 1987), Russian modern painter
- Yevhen Levchenko (born 1978), Ukrainian footballer
