= Waronker =

Waronker is a surname. Notable people with the surname include:

- Anna Waronker (born 1972), American singer-songwriter, composer, and producer
- Joey Waronker (born 1969), American drummer and music producer
- Lenny Waronker (born 1941), American record producer for Warner Bros
- Shimon Waronker, New York City public school principal
- Simon Waronker (1915–2005), American violinist and record producer

== See also ==
- Voronkov
