= Yaroslavsky =

Yaroslavsky (masculine), Yaroslavskaya (feminine), or Yaroslavskoye (neuter) may refer to:

- Yaroslavsky District, name of several districts in Russia
- Yaroslavsky (inhabited locality) (Yaroslavskaya, Yaroslavskoye), name of several inhabited localities in Russia
- Yaroslavsky Rail Terminal, a rail terminal in Moscow, Russia
- Yaroslavsky (surname)

== See also ==
- Yaroslavl (disambiguation)
