= Lev Lopatinsky =

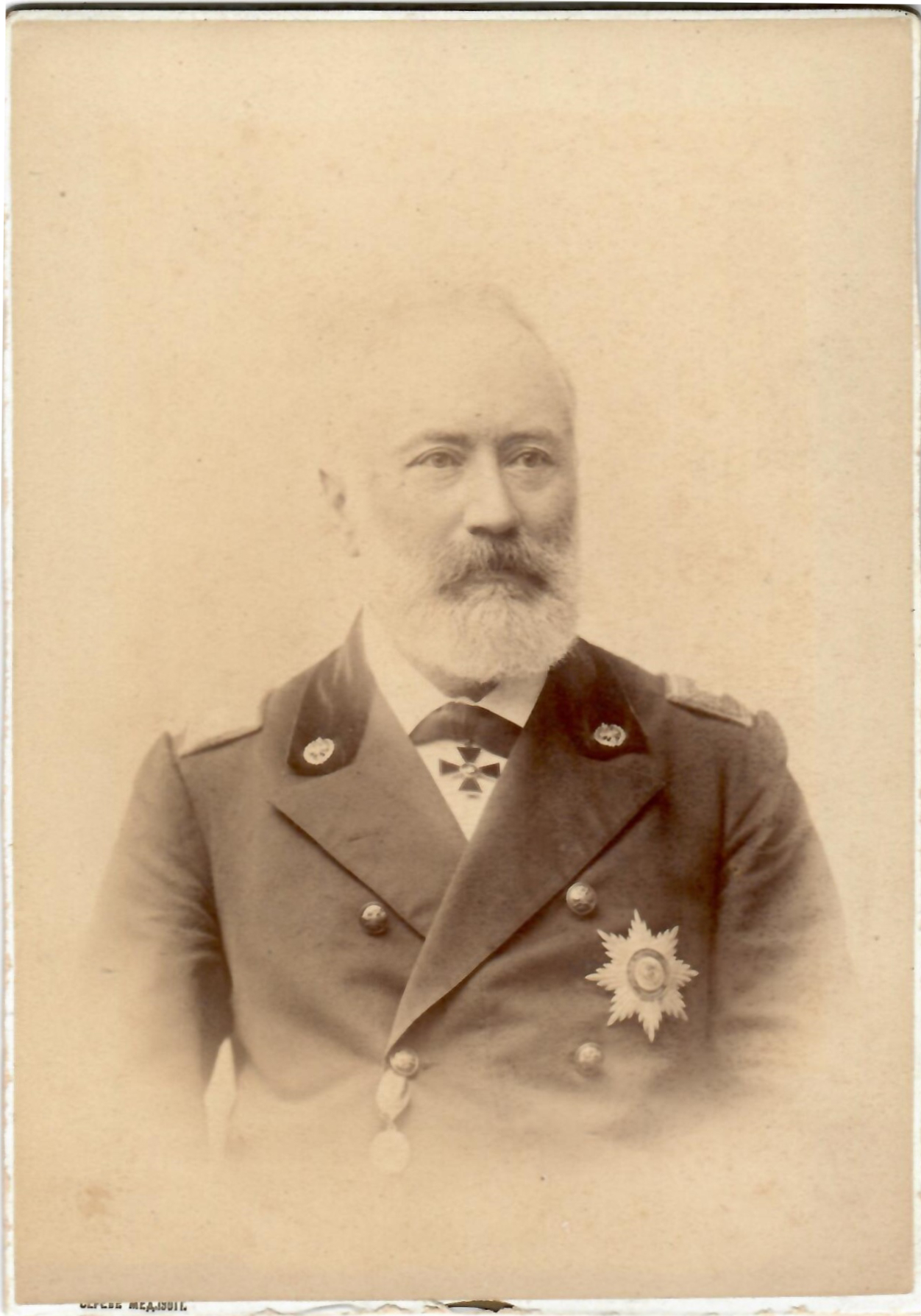
- Born: 18 January 1842; Dolyna, Galicia and Lodomeria, Austrian Empire
- Died: 21 August 1922 (aged 80); Baku, Azerbaijan SSR, Transcaucasia
- Education: Charles University
- Known for: researcher of the languages of the peoples of the Caucasus
- Children: Boris Lopatinskiy, father of Yaroslav Lopatynskyi
- Scientific career
- Fields: ethnography, history, philology, linguistics

Lev Grigorievich Lopatinsky (Russian: Лев Григорьевич Лопатинский; 18 January [O.S. 6 January] 1842 – 21 August 1922) was a Ukrainian and Russian linguist, philologist, ethnographer, historian and researcher of the languages of the peoples of the Caucasus.

== Biography ==
Born and raised in Dolyna (modern Ivano-Frankivsk Oblast of Ukraine). After graduating from the Stanislav Gymnasium he studied at the Charles University, then at the University of Lviv, graduating in 1864. For some time he taught in Lviv simultaneously doing literary work. In the same year his translation into Ukrainian of the story of the Czech writer P. Khokholushka "Coconut Field" was published, and the following year he published the "People's calendar for the ordinary year 1865".

From 1866 he lived in the Russian Empire. He worked as a Latin language teacher in the gymnasiums of Kyiv, Ufa, Pyatigorsk and other cities and published the Latin-Russian dictionary and the Guide for basic teaching of the Latin language, which was published in 5 editions. In 1883 he was appointed head of the Pyatigorsk gymnasium, later assistant trustee of the Caucasian educational district from Leipzig University. For the publication of "Kabardian Grammar with a Dictionary", for which the Academic Council of Leipzig University awarded him the title of doctor of philosophy and Master of Arts.

Since 1917 Lev Lopatinsky has been working as an assistant professor at the Transcaucasian University and after its liquidation (1919) as a professor at Baku University.

It is known that Lev Lopatinsky spoke almost all Caucasian languages and their dialect varieties. By this time his works: “Lectures on Caucasian Studies", "Introduction", "The connection of Caucasian languages with others" and his researches "Mstislav Tmutarakansky and Rededya according to the legend of the Circassians", Kabardian legend "Beauty Elena and the hero-woman", "Talysh texts".

Lev Lopatinsky was one of the founders and invariable head of the Caucasian Department of the Moscow Archaeological Society, which studied and systematized numerous information from the life of the Transcaucasian ethnic groups, the specifics of their languages and folklore heritage, he aldo was the editor of the "Collection of materials for describing localities" and "Turks, their language and literature", "Turkic folk literature", "Azerbaijani literature", "Nizami and his contemporaries". He gave 30 years of his life to work on the "Collection" and worked on this editing until 1924.

He died on 21 August 1922 in Baku. His grandson is the famous Soviet mathematician Yaroslav Lopatynskyi.

== Awards ==
In 1917, the Academy of Sciences of Russia awarded him the Baron Rosen medal for his work in the field of Oriental studies and archaeology.

== Bibliography ==
- «Латинская книга для чтения» (Latin book to read. Kyiv, 1871)
- «Народный календарь» (Folk calendar, 1861)
- «Кабардинская грамматика со славаремъ» (Kabardian grammar with a dictionary)
- «Краткая Кабардинская грамматика» (Brief Kabardian grammar, 1891)
- «Русско-кабардинский словарь с обратным указателем» (Russian-Kabardian dictionary with reverse index)
- «Суффиксы русского языка. Влияние кавказских языков на их образование» (Suffixes of the Russian language. The influence of Caucasian languages on their education, 1902),
- «Заметки об особенностях нальчикского говора» (Notes on the features of the Nalchik dialect, 1904),
- «Кое-что о кумыках и об их языке» (Something about the Kumyks and their language)
- «Русско-кабардинский словарь с указателем и краткой грамматикой» (Russian-Kabardian dictionary, 1890)
- "Талышинские тексты" (Talysh texts, 1894)
- «Кабардинская азбука» (Kabardian alphabet, 1906).

== See also ==
- Yaroslav Lopatynskyi
- Peoples of the Caucasus
- Languages of the Caucasus
