= Popivtsi =

Rural locality in Lviv Oblast, Ukraine

- Village
- Location within Lviv Oblast Location within Ukraine
- Coordinates: 49°57′35″N 25°23′07″E
- Country: Ukraine
- Oblast: Lviv
- Raion: Zolochiv
- Area: 2.121 km^{2} (0.819 sq mi)
- Population: 477
  - Density: 224/km^{2} (580/sq mi)

Popivtsi (Ukrainian: Попівці) is a village (selo) in Zolochiv Raion, Lviv Oblast, in western Ukraine. It belongs to Pidkamin settlement hromada, one of the hromadas of Ukraine.

From 1918 to 1939 the village was in Tarnopol Voivodeship in Poland.

Popivtsi also is the administrative center of the local rural council that includes five villages including Popivtsi. The other villages are Horbanivka, Dudyn, Nemyach, and Shpaky. The total population of those five villages is 1,722 over 32626 km^{2}.

Until 18 July 2020, Popivtsi belonged to Brody Raion. The raion was abolished in July 2020 as part of the administrative reform of Ukraine, which reduced the number of raions of Lviv Oblast to seven. The area of Brody Raion was merged into Zolochiv Raion.

== Notable residents ==
- Yaroslav Onyshchuk (born 1967), Ukrainian archaeologist, historian, scientist
