= Yarko =

Yarko is a Ukrainian diminutive for the given name Yaroslav. Notable people known under this name include:

- Yarko Antonevych, Ukrainian bandura player
- Yaroslav "Yarko" Pustovyi, former Ukrainian astronaut and Canadian businessman
- Yarko Kuk, American businessman and editor of The Village Voice of Ottawa Hills

== Fictional characters ==
- Yarko the Great, Fox Comics character
