= Vitaliy Bunechko =

Ukrainian politician

- Віталій Бунечко
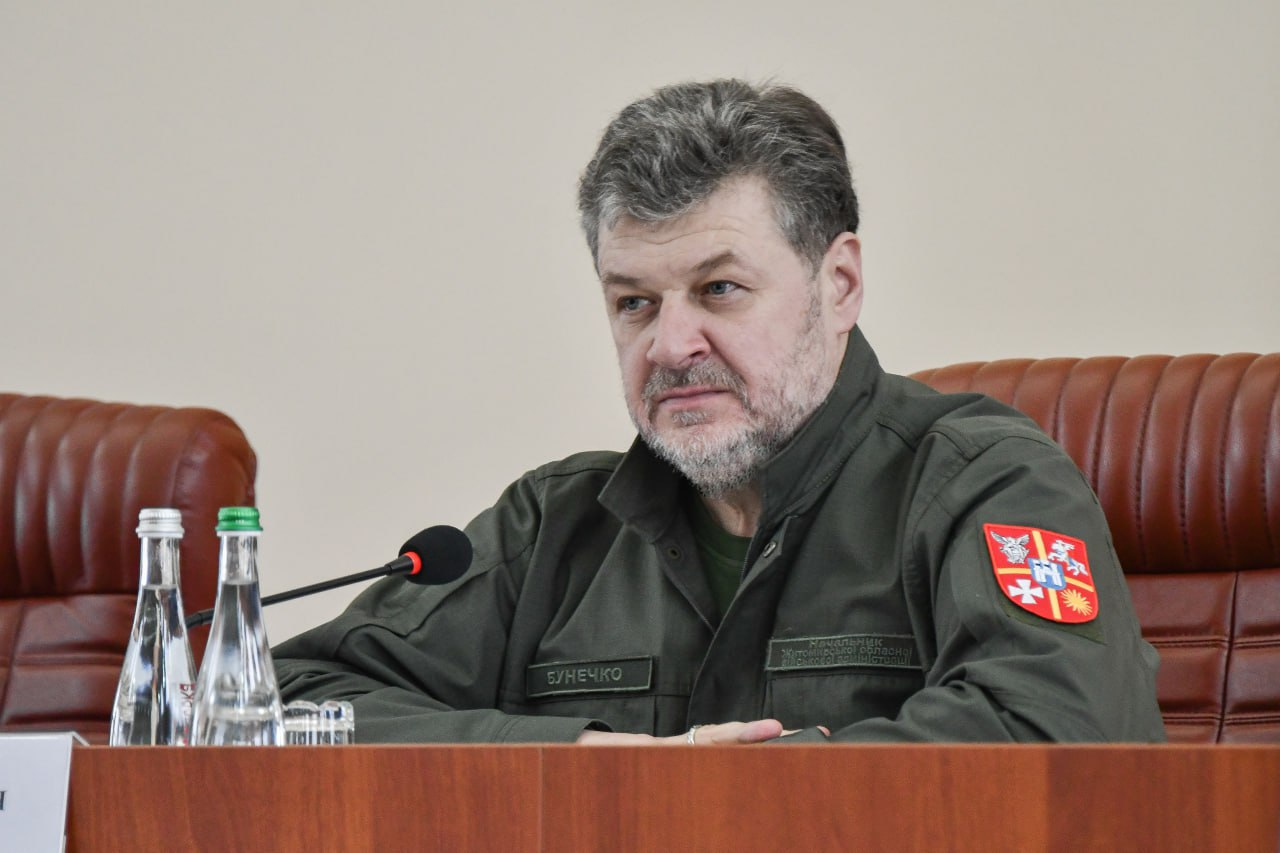
- Bunechko in 2023

Governor of Zhytomyr Oblast
- Incumbent
- Assumed office 8 August 2019
- President: Volodymyr Zelenskyy
- Prime Minister: Volodymyr Groysman; Oleksiy Honcharuk; Denys Shmygal
- Preceded by: Yaroslav Lahuta (Acting)

Personal details
- Born: 6 August 1973 (age 52) Sarny, Rivne Oblast, Ukrainian SSR, Soviet Union
- Party: Independent
- Education: Lutsk Pedagogical Institute; Security Service Academy
- Occupation: Civil servant; politician

Vitaliy Ivanovych Bunechko (Ukrainian: Віталій Іванович Бунечко; born 6 August 1973) is a Ukrainian civil servant and politician. He has served as the Governor of Zhytomyr Oblast since 2019.

== Biography ==
In 1995, he graduated from the Lutsk Pedagogical Institute. In 1997, he graduated from the Security Service Academy. Bunechko is a Candidate of Law Sciences.

From 1995 to 1996, he worked as a history teacher. From 1996 to 2018, Bunechko worked at the Security Service of Ukraine. He served in Mariupol, Donetsk Oblast.

== Awards ==
- Order of Bohdan Khmelnytsky, 3rd class (2022).
