= Yaroslavsky (surname) =

Yaroslavsky (masculine), Yaroslavskaya (feminine) is a Russian-language, most commonly Jewish, toponymic surname derived from any places named Yaroslavl or Jarosław. In the latter case the Polish-language surname Jarosławski also originates. The Ukrainian variant is Yaroslavskyi.

Notable people with the surname include:

- Cassian (Yaroslavsky) (1899–1990), Russian Orthodox bishop
- Katy Yaroslavsky, American attorney and politician, city councilwoman for Los Angeles
- Lesya Yaroslavskaya, Russian pop singer
- Oleksandr Yaroslavskyi (b. 1959), Ukrainian businessman, president of FC Metalist Kharkiv
- Yemelyan Yaroslavsky (Minei Gubelman), Soviet politician, leader of 1930s anti-religious campaign in the USSR
- Zev Yaroslavsky (b. 1948), U.S. politician
