= Voronkov =

Voronkov (a common Slavic family name, e.g. Russian: Воронков, Ukrainian: Воронков), from "Ворон" "Voron", meaning "raven" and may refer to:

- Andrei Voronkov (computer scientist), an academic involved with automated reasoning
- Dmitri Voronkov (born 2000), Russian ice hockey player
- Ihor Voronkov (born 1981), Ukrainian professional footballer
- Mitrofan Voronkov (1868–?), Russian politician
- Viktor Voronkov (born 1974), Russian professional footballer
- Vladimir Voronkov (1944–2018), Russian skier
- Vladimir Ivanovich Voronkov (born 1953), Russian diplomat
- Vladimir Romanovich Voronkov (1920–2012 ), Soviet colonel and Hero of the Soviet Union
- Yaroslav Voronkov (born 2003), Russian footballer
