= Janusz Jarosławski =

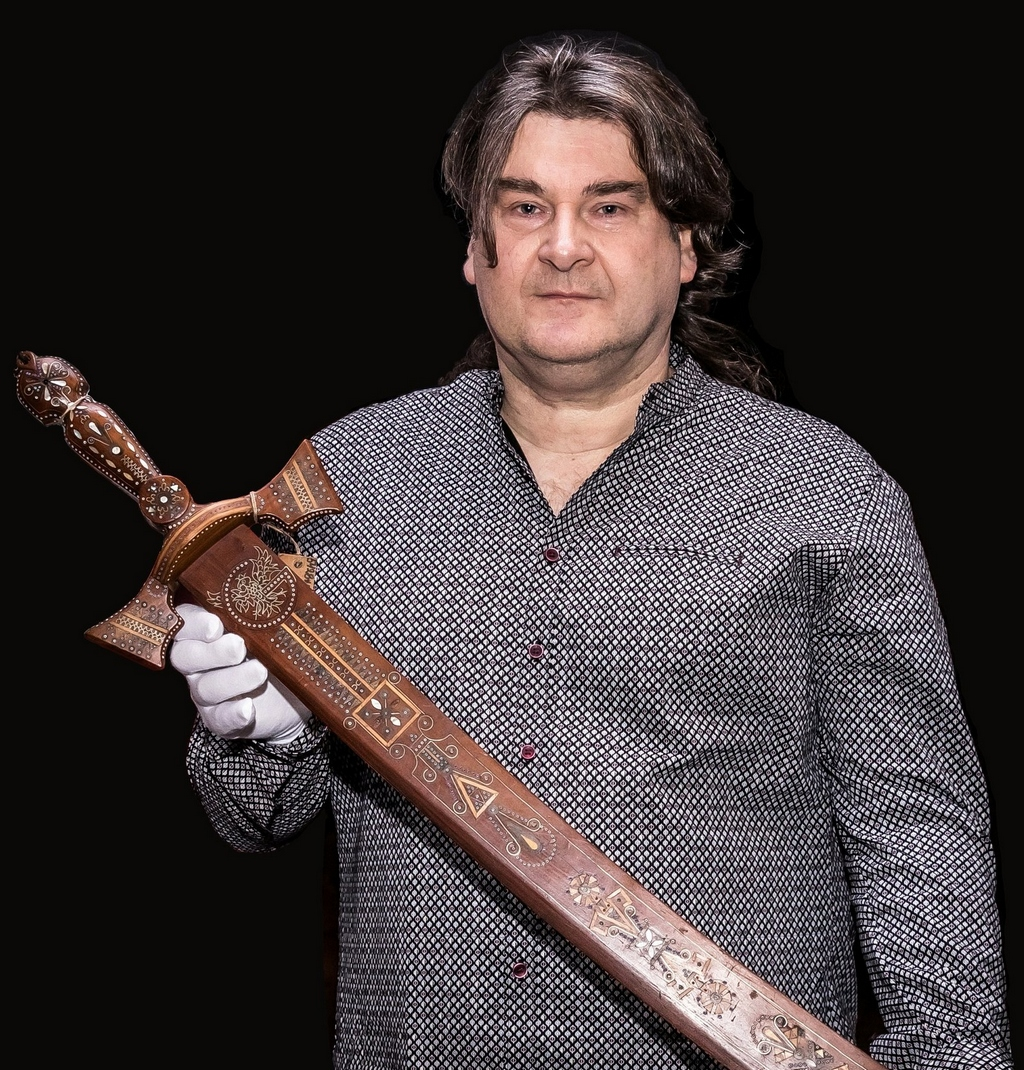
Janusz Jarosławski with a wooden replica of the sword of Józef Piłsudski

Janusz Franciszek Jarosławski (born 1967) is a Polish writer, an expert and collector of historical hand weapons, and history enthusiast.

== Books ==
- Szable Marszałka Józefa Piłsudskiego, Warszawa: „Madex” 2024. ISBN 978-83-960477-2-4
- Szable powstańców styczniowych 1863-1864, Warszawa: „Madex” 2023. ISBN 978-83-960477-9-3
- Kordziki Wojska Polskiego 1918–1939, Warszawa: „Madex” 2022. ISBN 9788396047717
- Szable carskiej Rosji t. 1-2, Warszawa: „Madex” 2020. ISBN 9788394713980, ISBN 9788394713997
- Bitwa Warszawska 1920: kalendarium – dowódcy – dokumenty, Warszawa: „Madex” 2020. ISBN 9788394713973
- Szable Wojska Polskiego 1918–1939, Warszawa: „Madex” 2019. ISBN 9788394713942 (Note: Translations: Swords of the Polish Army 1918–1939, Warszawa: „Madex” 2019. ISBN 9788394713966, Säbel der Polnischen Armee 1918–1939, Warszawa: „Madex” 2019. ISBN 9788394713959)
- Bagnety Wojska Polskiego 1918–1939, Warszawa: „Madex” 2018. ISBN 9788394713928 (Note: Translations: Bayonets Of The Polish Army 1918–1939, Warszawa: „Madex” 2018. ISBN 9788394713935)
- Bagnety krajów skandynawskich, Warszawa: „Madex” 2017. ISBN 9788394713904 (Note: Translations: Bayonets Swedish-Danish-Norwegian-Finnish, Warszawa: „Madex” 2017. ISBN 9788394713911)
- Szabla lekkiej kawalerii wzór 1796 i jej pochodzenie, Warszawa: „Madex” 2016. ISBN 9788393768042 (Note: Translations: The British cavalry sword and other derivatives, Warszawa: „Madex” 2016. ISBN 9788393768059)
- Niemieckie szable bojowe 1742–1918, Warszawa: „Madex” 2015. ISBN 9788393768066 (Note: Translations: Deutsche Mannschaftssäbel 1742–1918, Warszawa: „Madex” 2015. ISBN 9788393768073)
- Niemieckie szable i pałasze paradne XVIII-XX wieku, Biłgoraj: „Madex” 2014. ISBN 9788393768028 (Note: Translations: German Swords XVIII-XX Century, Biłgoraj: „Madex” 2014. ISBN 9788394713928)
- Szable Rosji i ZSRR, Biłgoraj: „Madex” 2013. ISBN 9788394713928 (Note: Translations: Russian Swords: Collections Catalogue, Biłgoraj: „Madex” 2014. ISBN 9788393768080)

== Awards and decorations ==
- 2021: Bronze Gloria Artis Medal for Merit to Culture for "protection of heritage"

He also received a number of other awards and decorations.
