= Kabardian grammar =

The standard Kabardian language, also known as Eastern Circassian, is spoken and written by the Kabardian and Besleney communities primarily in the Kabardino-Balkarian Republic and Karachay-Cherkessian Republic in Russia.

Karbardian is ergative–absolutive, predominantly marks head-finally and has a constituent word order of subject–object–verb (SOV). Its nouns are remarkably simple, only marking for 2 numbers and case (which is frequently optional). Its verbal morphology however is the most complex part of the language, being inflected with suffixes and prefixes, making it very agglutinative and polysynthetic. A verb can be marked for several persons (polypersonality), number, tense, mood, causative and with a large array of preverbs. Notions such as "can", "must", and "if", usually expressed as separate words in most European languages, are typically expressed with verbal suffixes in Karbardian.

== Ergative–absolutive ==
Kabardian is an ergative–absolutive language. Unlike nominative–accusative languages, such as English, where the single argument of an intransitive verb ("She" in the sentence "She walks.") behaves grammatically like the agent of a transitive verb ("She" in the sentence "She finds it."), in ergative–absolutive language the subject of an intransitive verb behaves like the object of a transitive verb, and differently from the agent of a transitive verb.

The following examples demonstrate an ergative–absolutive case marking system:

Ergative language
Sentence:	Ӏанэр мэкъутэ.		ЛӀым Ӏанэр екъутэ.		
Word:	Ӏанэ-р	мэкъутэ	ЛӀым	Ӏанэр	екъутэ
Gloss:	The table-ABS	breaks	The man-ERG	the table-ABS	breaks
Function:	S	VERB_{intrans}	A	O	VERB_{trans}
Translation:	"The table breaks."		"The man breaks the table."		

Here, "table" has the absolutive case mark -р /-r/ while "man" has the ergative case mark -м /-m/. We also have the verb "break" in intransitive form "мэкъутэ" and transitive form "екъутэ". In the example above, we specifically used SOV order, but Circassian allows any order.

Nouns in Kabardian can have the following roles in a sentence:

- Ergative case: Marked as -м /-m/, it serves to mark the one that causes change by doing the verb.
- Absolutive case: Marked as -р /-r/, it serves to mark the one that is changed by the verb's, i.e. it is being created, altered, moved or ended by the verb.
- Oblique case: Also marked as -м /-m/, it serves to mark the dative and applicative case roles. It acts as the indirect object in the sentence and its state is not changed by the verb, i.e. we have no indication of what happens to it or how it behaves after the verb.

In intransitive verbs the subject is in the absolutive case thus it indicates that the subject is changing (created, altered, moved or ended).

- In this example the boy is changing by moving:

ЩӀалэр макӀуэ
ЩӀалэ-р макӀуэ
[ɕʼaːɮar maːkʷʼa]
boy.ABS {(s)he is going}
"The boy is going."

- In this example the man is changing by moving. The verb еуэн /jawan/ "to hit" describes the movement of hitting and not the impact itself, so we have no indication of what happens to the object (the wall in this case).

ЛӀыр дэпкъым йоуэ
ЛӀы-р дэпкъы-м йоуэ
[ɬʼər dapqəm jowa]
man.ABS wall.OBL {(s)he is hitting}
"The man is hitting the wall."
lit. "the man is hitting at the wall."

In transitive verbs the subject is in the ergative case thus it indicates that the subject causes change to the object which gets the absolutive case.

- In this example the wall changes by being destroyed (it was altered). The verb къутэн /qʷətan/ "to destroy" does not indicate how the subject (boy) destroyed the wall thus we have no indication of the boy changing, making him the one that causes the change (and not the one that changes).

ЩӀалэм дэпкъыр икъутащ
ЩӀалэ-м дэпкъы-р икъутащ
[ɕʼaːɮam dapqər jəqʷətaːɕ]
boy.ERG wall.ABS {(s)he destroyed}
"The boy destroyed the wall."

- In this example the rock changes by moving (motion in air), the man causes the change and the wall acts as the indirect object of the preposition.

ЛӀым мывэр дэпкъым тедзэ
[ɬʼəm məvar dapqəm tajd͡za]
man.ERG rock.ABS wall.OBL {(s)he is throwing at}
"The man is throwing the rock at the wall."

It is important to distinguish between the intransitive and transitive verb, because the subject and object noun cases as well as the sentences' verb conjunctions (the prefixes that indicate person) depend on it. A fault in this can change the meaning of the sentence drastically, switching the roles of the subject and object. For instance, look at the following two sentences:

ЩӀалэм пщащэр йолъэгъу
ЩӀалэ-м пщащэ-р йолъэгъу
[ɕʼaːɮam pɕaːɕar jawɬaʁʷ]
boy.ERG girl.ABS {(s)he is seeing}
"The boy is seeing the girl."

ЩӀалэм пщащэр йоплъ
ЩӀалэ-м пщащэ-р йоплъ
[ɕʼaːɮam pɕaːɕar jawpɬ]
boy.OBL girl.ABS {(s)he is looking at}
"The girl is looking at the boy."

Even though the noun cases of the word boy кӀалэ are the same (In the Ergative-Oblique case marked as -м), they behave grammatically different because the verb еплъын "to look" is considered an intransitive verb in contrast to the verb елъэгъун "to see" which is transitive.

== Nouns ==
Kabardian nouns inflect for number, case, and definiteness. The plural suffix is -хэ (унэ "house" → унэхэр "houses"), though plural meaning is often carried by the verb instead. Collective nouns such as къуажэ "village" and унагъуэ "family" act as a plurale tantum: they take no plural suffix but trigger plural agreement elsewhere. A definite noun carries a case marker, while an indefinite one is usually unmarked (щӀалэ "a boy" vs. щӀалэр "the boy").

As an ergative–absolutive language, Kabardian declines nouns in four cases:

Case	Suffix	Example
Absolutive	-р	щӀалэр "the boy" (intransitive subject; transitive object)
Ergative–Oblique	-м	щӀалэм "the boy's / to the boy" (transitive subject, possessor, indirect object, location)
Instrumental–directional	-(м)кӀэ	къэрэндащымкӀэ "with the pencil" (means or direction)
Adverbial	-у(э)	щӀалу "as a boy" (turns the noun into a modifier)

The third-person pronouns double as demonstratives and use suppletive forms rather than the regular suffixes: ар / ахэр (absolutive) and ащ / ахэм (ergative–oblique).

When a noun is followed by an adjective, the case suffix attaches to the adjective rather than the noun (пщэщэ дахэр "the pretty girl"). Possession is shown with the prefix и- on the possessed noun (ищӀалэ "his/her boy"), and adjectives can become abstract nouns with -агъэ (дахэ "pretty" → дахагъэ "beauty"). New nouns are also formed by compounding and by productive suffixes such as -пӀэ "place" (еджапӀэ "school") and -кӀуэ "agent" (еджакӀуэ "student"). Kabardian is a pro-drop language, so subject and object pronouns are often omitted because the verb marks person and number.

== Demonstratives ==
Kabardian has three demonstratives: а /ʔaː/, мо /mo/ and мы /mə/.

а /ʔaː/

1. that
  а Ӏанэ — that table
  а пщащэ — that girl
  а щӀалэм жыӀэ — that boy is saying
- The determiner 'а' /ʔaː/ refer to a referent that is far away and invisible to both the speaker and the listener(s). It is similar to the English language determiner that, but with the condition that the referent has to be invisible or far away.

мо /maw/

1. that
  мо Ӏанэ — that table
  мо пщащэ — that girl
  мо щӀалэм жыӀэ — that boy is saying
- The determiner 'мо' refer to a referent that is visible and in a known distance from both the speaker and the listener(s) (both the speaker and the listener(s) can see the referent). It is similar to the English language determiner that, but with the condition that the referent has to be visible.

мы /mə/

1. this
  мы Ӏанэ — this table
  мы пщащэ — this girl
  мы щӀалэм жыӀэ — this boy is saying
- The determiner 'мы' refer to a referent that is close to both the speaker and the listener(s). It is exactly like the English language determiner this.

=== Conjugation ===
The demonstratives can be used to express different things like:

Location: адэ "there", модэ "there", мыдэ "here".
Similarity: апхуэд "like that", мопхуэд "like", мыпхуэд "like this".

== Pronouns ==
=== Personal pronouns ===
In Kabardian, only the first and second person, singular and plural, pronouns have dedicated words. Effectively speaking in terms of usage, а is the third person pronoun, however that is a demonstrative (for more details see here).

Case	1st-person		2nd-person	
Case	singular	plural	singular	plural
Absolutive	сэ sa	дэ da	уэ wa	фэ fa
Ergative	сэ sa	дэ da	уэ wa	фэ fa
Instrumental	сэркӀэ sart͡ʃʼa	дэркӀэ dart͡ʃʼa	уэркӀэ wart͡ʃʼa	фэркӀэ fart͡ʃʼa
Adverbial	сэру sarəw	дэру darəw	уэру warəw	фэру farəw

сэ тхылъым седжащ
сэ тхылъы-м се-дж-ащ
[sa txəɬəm sajd͡ʒaːɕ]
I {the book.ERG} {(s)he read}
"I read the book"

дэркӀэ мы шхыныр лъапӀэ
дэр-кӀэ мы шхыны-р лъапӀэ
[dart͡ʃʼa mə ʃxənər ɬaːpʼa]
{For us.INS} this {the food.ABS} expensive
"This food is expensive for us"

=== Demonstrative Pronouns ===
Demonstrative pronouns are мы "this", мо "that", а "that". There is a contradistinction between 'мы' and 'мо' on how far the referred object is. The pronoun 'а' is neutral on this matter. Third person pronouns are expressed as demonstrative pronouns.

	Case	Demonstratives		
	Case	а	мо	мы
Singular	Absolutive	ар aːr	мор mor	мыр mər
Singular	Ergative	абы aːbə	мобы mobə	мыбы məbə
Singular	Instrumental	абыкӀэ aːbət͡ʃʼa	мобыкӀэ mobət͡ʃʼa	мыбыкӀэ məbət͡ʃʼa
Singular	Adverbial	арэу aːraw	морэу moraw	мырэу məraw
Plural	Absolutive	ахэр aːxar	мохэр moxar	мыхэр məxar
Plural	Ergative	абыхэм aːbəxam	мобыхэм mobəxam	мыбыхэм məbəxam
Plural	Instrumental	абыхэмкӀэ aːbəxamt͡ʃʼa	мобыхэмкӀэ mobəxamt͡ʃʼa	мыбыхэмкӀэ məbəxamt͡ʃʼa
Plural	Adverbial	ахэрэу aːxaraw	мохэрэу moxaraw	мыхэрэу məxaraw

мыбы щӀакхъуэ йошхы
мыбы щӀакхъуэ йо-шхы
[məbə ɕʼaːqχʷa jawʃx]
This.ERG {a bread} {(s)he eats}
"This person/animal eats bread"

мыбыкӀэ щӀалэр къакӀуэ
мыбы0кӀэ щӀалэ0р къа-кӀуэ
[məbət͡ʼa ɕʼaːɮar qaːkʷʼa]
{This way.INS} {the boy.ABS} {(s)he is coming}
"The boy is coming from this way"

=== Possessive Pronouns ===
Plurality	Person	Prefix		meaning	example
Plurality	Person	Cyrillic	IPA	meaning	example
Singular	1st person	си-	/səj-/	"my"	сиунэ /səjwəna/ – my house; ситхылъ /səjtxəɬ/ – my book
Singular	2nd person	уи-	/wəj-/	"your"	уиунэ /wəjwəna/ – your house; уитхылъ /wəjtxəɬ/ – your book
Singular	3rd person	и-	/jə-/	"his"	иунэ /jəwəna/ – his house; итхылъ /jətxəɬ/ – his book
Plural	1st person	ди-	/dəj-/	"our"	диунэ /dəjwəna/ – our house; дитхылъ /dəjtxəɬ/ – our book
Plural	2nd person	фи-	/fəj-/	"your"	фиунэ /fəjwəna/ – your house; фитхылъ /fəjtxəɬ/ – your book
Plural	3rd person	я-	/jaː-/	"their"	яунэ /jaːwəna/ – their house; ятхылъ /jaːtxəɬ/ – their book

си унэ фыкъакӀуэ
си унэ фы-къа-кӀуэ
[səj wəna fəqaːkʷʼa]
my house come.PL
"Come to my house"

ди машинэкӀэ къалэм докӀуэ
ди машинэ-кӀэ къалэм до-кӀуэ
[dəj maːʃinat͡ʃʼa qaːɮam dawkʷʼa]
Our {using the car.INS} {the city.ERG} {we are going}
"we are going to the city with our car"

Case	1st-person		2nd-person		3rd-person	
Case	singular	plural	singular	plural	singular	plural
Absolutive	сэсий sasəj	дэдий dadəj	уэуий wawəj	фэфий fafəj	ий jəj	яй jaːj
Ergative	сэсый sasəj	дэдий dadəj	уэуий wawəj	фэфий fafəj	ий jəj	яй jaːj
Instrumental	сэсиемкӀэ sasəjamt͡ʃʼa	дэдиемкӀэ tatəjamt͡ʃʼa	уэуиемкӀэ wawəjamt͡ʃʼa	фэфиемкӀэ ʃʷaʃʷəjamt͡ʃʼa	иемкӀэ jəjamt͡ʃʼa	яемкӀэ jaːjamt͡ʃʼa
Adverbial	сэсийу sasəjaw	дэдийу dadəjaw	уэуийу wawəjaw	фэфийу fafəjaw	иеу jəjaw	яеу jaːjaw

=== Indefinite pronoun ===
In Kabardian whole one – зыгоруэ, Serves for indication of all notions corresponding to English words "someone", "something", "someone", "something", "sometime", "somewhere", etc. Зыгуэрэ changes either as noun – in number and in cases:

Case	Singular form	Plural form
Absolutive	зыгуэрэ zəɡʷara	зыгуэрэхэр zəɡʷaraxar
Ergative	зыгуэрэм zəɡʷaram	зыгорэхэмэ zəɡʷaraxama
Instrumental	зыгуэрэ(м)кӀэ zəɡʷara(m)t͡ʃʼa	зыгуэрэхэ(м)кӀэ zəɡʷaraxa(m)t͡ʃʼa
Adverbial	зыгуэрэу zəɡʷaraw	зыгуэрэхэу zəɡʷaraxaw

== Adjectives ==
Kabardian adjectives are morphologically close to nouns and share their number and case markers. The defining feature is phrase-final affixation: when an adjective modifies a noun, the noun stays in its bare stem and the markers for number (-хэ) and case attach to the end of the whole phrase — normally to the adjective (пщащэ дахэр "the beautiful girl", пщащэ дахэхэр "the beautiful girls"). The same holds for adjectives that behave as suffixes, such as the augmentative -шхуэ "big" (унэшхуэхэр "the big houses"). Qualitative adjectives ("good", "tall") follow the noun, while relative or material adjectives ("iron", "wooden") precede it and do not inflect (гъущӀ пӀэкӀорыр "the iron bed"). Used on its own, an adjective declines like a noun through all four cases (хужьыр "the white one", хужьым "of/to the white one").

Degree is expressed analytically: the comparative with the particle нэхъ "more" (Ар абы нэхъ лъагэщ "He is taller than that one") and the superlative with янэхъ "most" (Ар пщащэмэ янэхъ дахэщ "She is the most beautiful of the girls"). Size and age are marked by suffixes on the noun (унащӀэ "new house", унэжьы "old house", унэцӀыкӀу "small house"), while a range of suffixes modify the degree of a quality:

Meaning	Suffix	Example
very	~дэд	дэгъудэд "very good"
slightly	~Ӏуэ	стырыӀуэ "slightly spicy"
too much	~щэ	дыджыщэ "too bitter"
quite	~кӀей	дэгъукӀей "pretty good"
lacking	~ншэ	акъылыншэ "mindless"

Adjectives also feed productive derivation. The suffix -гъэ turns them into abstract nouns of measure (кӀыхь "long" → кӀыхьагъэ "length"; дахэ "beautiful" → дэхагъэ "beauty"), while -гъакӀэ forms nouns for the state or essence of a quality (дэхэгъакӀэ "(inherent) prettiness"). The prefix фӀэ- forms psychological predicates meaning "X is [adjective] to someone" (дахэ "beautiful" → фӀэдах "it is beautiful to him/her").

== Verbs ==
=== Tenses ===
Tense	Suffix	Example	Meaning
Present	~(р) /~(r)/	макӀуэ /maːkʷʼa/	(s)he is going; (s)he goes
Preterite	~ащ /~aːɕ/	кӀуащ /kʷʼaːɕ/	(s)he went
Pluperfect	~гъащ /~ʁaːɕ/	кӀуэгъащ /kʷʼaʁaːɕ/	(s)he went a long time ago"
Categorical Future	~нщ /~nɕ/	кӀуэнщ /kʷʼanɕ/	(s)he will go
Factual Future	~нущ /~nəwɕ/	кӀуэнущ /kʷʼanəwɕ/	(s)he will go, (s)he is about to go
Imperfect	~(р)т /~(r)t/	кӀуэ(р)т /kʷʼa(r)t/	(s)he was going
Anterior Perfect (Perfect II)	~ат /~aːt/	кӀуат /kʷʼaːt/	(then) (s)he went
Anterior Pluperfect	~гъат /~ʁaːt/	кӀуэгъат /kʷʼaʁaːt/	(then) (s)he went a long time ago"
Future II Categorical	~нт /~nt/	кӀуэнт /kʷʼant/	(s)he was about to go / (s)he would go
Future II Factual	~нут /~nəwt/	кӀуэнут /kʷʼanəwt/	(s)he was about to go / (s)he would go

=== Valency ===
Verb valency is the number of arguments controlled by a verbal predicate. It is very close to the concept of transitivity, in the sense that base intransitive verbs are monovalent, while base transitive verbs are bivalent.

Most operations in Kabardian are valency increasing operations, in frequency as well as in amount of morphemes. Those operations usually affect the transitivity, or rather any operations which affects the transitivity (almost) always affects the valency.

Among the valency increasing operations is the causative prefix and the various preverbs. E.g.:

- ар мажэ: he runs -> абы ар егъажэ: he makes him run
- ар матхэ: he writes -> абы ар егъатхэ: he makes him write

Among the valency decreasing operations is the reflexive person marker. E.g.:

- абы уэ уехуапэ: he clothes you -> абы зехуапэ: he dresses (lit. he clothes himself)
- хъыджэбзым хьэкъущыкъур итхьэщIащ: the girl washee the dishes -> хъыджэбзым зитхьэщIащ: the girl washee herself

==== Valency increasing ====
Case	Prefix	Meaning	Example
Causative	гъэ~ [ʁa~]	"to force, to make"	гъэ-плъэн [ʁapɬan] "to make him look at"
Comitative	дэ~ [da~]	"with"	д-еплъын [dajpɬən] "to look with"
Benefactive	хуэ~ [xʷa~]	"for"	ху-еплъын [xʷajpɬən] "to look for"
Malefactive	фӀ~ [fʼa~]	"against one's interest"	фӀ-еплъын [fʼajpɬən] "to look against his interest"
Reflexive	зэ~ [za~]	"self"	зэ-плъын [zapɬən] "to look at oneself"

=== Moods ===
==== Imperative ====
The imperative mood denotes a command.

As its subject, the imperative mood can only have the second person as its subject. It is formed by stripping away all tense suffixes from the verb, with the specialty that the positive second-person singular form doesn't mark the subject. The negative is marked by мы-.

infinitive	meaning	positive singular	negative singular	positive plural	negative plural
кIуэн	to go	кIуэ	умыкIуэ	фыкIуэ	фымыкIуэ
тхын	to write Y	тхы	умытх	фтхы	фымытх
къэщтэн	to take Y	къэщтэ	къыумыщтэ	къэфщтэ	къэвмыщтэ

==== Conditional ====
Conditional mood is expressed with suffix -мэ: сы-кIуэ-мэ "if I go", сы-жэ-мэ "if I run", с-щIэ-мэ "if I do".

==== Concessive ====
Concessive mood is expressed with suffix -ми: сы-кIуэ-ми "even if I go", сы-жэ-ми "even if I run", с-щIэ-ми "even if I do".

==== Affirmative ====
Affirmative form is expressed with the affix -къэ: кӀуэ-къэ "isn't he is going?", гыщӀэ-къэ "isn't he washing?".

=== Positional conjugation ===
In Kabardian, the positional prefixes are expressing being in different positions and places and can also express the direction of the verb. Here is the positional conjugation of some dynamic verbs, showing how the prefix changes the indicated direction of the verb:

Position	Prefix	Example	
Position	Prefix	Looking	Throwing
Body position/Pose	щы~ [ɕə~]	щеплъэ [ɕajpɬa] "(s)he is looking at that place"	щедзы [ɕajd͡za] "(s)he is throwing at that place"
On	те~ [taj~]	теплъэ [tajpɬa] "(s)he is looking on"	тедзэ [tajd͡za] "(s)he is throwing at"
Under	щӀэ~ [ɕʼa~]	щӀаплъэ [ɕʼaːpɬa] "(s)he is looking under"	щӀедзэ [ɕʼajd͡za] "(s)he is throwing under"
Through	хэ~ [xa~]	хаплъэ [xaːpɬa] "(s)he is looking through"	хедзэ [xajd͡za] "(s)he is throwing through"
Within some area	дэ~ [da~]	даплъэ [daːpɬa] "(s)he is looking at some area"	дедзэ [dajd͡za] "(s)he is throwing at some area"
Inside an object	дэ~ [da~]	даплъэ [daːpɬa] "(s)he is looking inside an object"	дедзэ [dajd͡za] "(s)he is throwing inside an object"
Around	Ӏу~ [ʔʷə~]	Ӏуаплъэ [ʔʷaːpɬa] "(s)he is looking around"	Ӏуедзэ [ʔʷajd͡za] "(s)he is throwing around"
Inside	и~ [jə~]	еплъэ [japɬa] "(s)he is looking inside"	редзэ [rajd͡za] "(s)he is throwing inside"
Hanged/Attached	пы~ [pə~]	пэплъэ [papɬa] "(s)he is searching by looking"	педзэ [pajd͡za] "(s)he is hanging by throwing"
Behind	къуэ~ [qʷa~]	къуаплъэ [qʷaːpɬa] "(s)he is looking behind"	къуедзэ [qʷajd͡za] "(s)he is throwing behind"
Aside	го~ [ɡʷa~]	гуаплъэ [ɡʷaːpɬa] "(s)he is looking aside"	гуедзэ [ɡʷajd͡za] "(s)he is throwing aside"
Against	пэӀу~ [paʔʷə~]	пэӀуаплъэ [paʔʷaːpɬa] "(s)he is looking against"	пэӀуедзэ [paʔʷajd͡za] "(s)he is throwing against"
Backwards	зэщӀ~ [zaɕʼ~]	зэщӀаплъэ [zaɕʼaːpɬa] "(s)he is looking backwards"	зэщӀедзэ [zaɕʼajd͡za] "(s)he is throwing backwards"
Inside within	кӀуэцӀы~ [kʷʼat͡sʼə~]	кӀуэцӀаплъэ [kʷʼat͡sʼaːpɬa] "(s)he is looking within inside"	кӀуэцӀедзэ [kʷʼat͡sʼajd͡za] "(s)he is throwing within inside"
Toward	кӀэлъы~ [kʲʼaɬə~]	кӀэлъэплъэ [ɬapɬa] "(s)he is looking toward"	кӀэлъедзы [ɬajd͡zə] "(s)he is throwing toward"
Past	блэ~ [bɮa~]	блэплъы [bɮapɬə] "(s)he is looking past"	бледзэ [bɮajd͡za] "(s)he is throwing past"
Over	щхьэпыры~ [ɕħapərə~]	щхьэпырыплъы [ɕħapərəpɬə] "(s)he is looking over"	щхьэпыредзэ [ɕħapərajd͡za] "(s)he is throwing over"
Directly	жьэхэ~ [ʑaxa~]	жьэхаплъэ [ʑaxaːpɬa] "(s)he is glaring at one's face"	жьэхедзэ [ʑaxajd͡za] "(s)he is throwing at one's face"
Mouth	жьэдэ~ [ʑada~]	жьэдаплъэ [ʑadaːpɬa] "(s)he is looking at a mouth"	жьэдедзэ [ʑadajd͡za] "(s)he is throwing at a mouth"

Here is the positional conjugation of some verbs, showing how the root changes indicate position:

	stands	sits	lies
Body position/Pose	щыт (ɕət)	щыс (ɕəs)	щылъ (ɕəɬ)
On	тет (tajt)	тес (tajs)	телъ (tajɬ)
Under	щIэт (ɕ’at)	щIэс (ɕ’as)	щIэлъ (ɕ’aɬ)
Among	хэт (xat)	хэс (xas)	хэлъ (xaɬ)
Within some area	дэт (dat)	дэс (das)	дэлъ (daɬ)
Behind	Ӏут (ʔʷət)	Ӏyc (ʔʷəs)	Ӏулъ (ʔʷəɬ)
Inside	ит (jət)	иc (jəs)	илъ (jəɬ)
Hanged or attached	пыт (pət)	пыc (pəs)	пылъ (pəɬ)
Corner or behind	къуэт (qʷat)	къуэc (qʷas)	къуэлъ (qʷaɬ)
Side	гуэт (gʷat)	гуэc (gʷas)	гуэлъ (gʷaɬ)
In front of	пэӀут (paʔʷət)	пэӀуc (paʔʷəs)	пэӀулъ (paʔʷəɬ)
Inside within	кӀуэцӀыт (kʷʼat͡sʼət)	кӀуэцӀыс (kʷʼat͡sʼəs)	кӀуэцӀылъ (kʷʼat͡sʼəɬ)
Slope	кӀэрыт (kʲʼarət)	кӀэрыс (kʲʼarəs)	кӀэрылъ (kʲʼarəɬ)
Over	щхьэпырыт (ɕħapərət)	щхьэпырыс (ɕħapərəs)	щхьэпырылъ (ɕħapərəɬ)
Directly	жьэхэт (ʑaxat)	жьэхэс (ʑaxas)	жьэхэлъ (ʑaxaɬ)
Toward the mouth	жьэдэт (ʑadat)	жьэдэс (ʑadas)	жьэдэлъ (ʑadaɬ)

Examples:

щыт – [someone or something] stands (as a pose);

Iут – [someone or something] stands (behind);

щIэт – [someone or something] stands (under)

тет – [someone or something] stands (above)

дэт – [someone or something] stands (between), etc.

== Adverbs ==
In the Kabardian language adverbs belong to these groups: adverbs of place, adverbs of time, adverbs of quality and adverbs of amount.

=== Adverbs of place ===
- адэ – "there" (invisible).
- модэ – "there" (visible).
- мыдэ – "here".

модэкӀэ тучаныр Ӏут
модэ-кӀэ тучан-ыр Ӏут
[modat͡ʃʼa tut͡ʃaːnər ʔʷərt]
{over there.INS} shop.ABS {it is standing}
"The shop is placed over there."

адэ щӀалэр кӀуащ
адэ щӀалэ-р кӀу-ащ
[aːda ɕʼaːɮar kʷʼaːɕ]
there boy.ABS {(S)he went}
"The boy went there."

=== Adverbs of time ===
- нобэ – "today".
- дыгъуасэ – "yesterday".
- пщэдей – "tomorrow".
- мыгъэ – "this year".
- иджы – "now".
- иджыри – "still"
- иджыпсту – "right now".
- пщэдджыжьым – "at morning".
- шэджагъуэм – "at noon".
- жэщым – "in the night".
- зэманым – "in the past".
- етӀанэ – "afterwards"

=== Adverbs of amount ===
- мащӀэ – "few".
- тӀэкӀу – "a bit".
- тӀэкӀурэ – "few times, for a short period of time".
- куэд "a lot".
- куэдрэ "a lot of times, for a long period of time".
- Ӏаджэ "many".

щӀалэм ахъщэ куэд иӀ
щӀалэ-м ахъщэ куэд иӀ
[ɕʼaːɮam aːχɕa kʷad jəʔ]
boy.ERG money {a lot} {(s)he has}
"The boy has a lot of money."

жэщым лӀыр тӀэкӀурэ макӀуэ
жэщы-м лӀы-р тӀэкӀурэ макӀуэ
ʒaɕəm ɬʼər tʼakʷʼra maːkʷʼa]
night.ERG man.ABS {short period of time} {(s)he went}
"In the night, the man goes for a small period of time."

=== Adverbs of quality ===
Adverbs of this group are formed from the appropriate qualitative adjectives using the suffix ~у /~w/. Adverbs in this group describe the manner in which the verb was done.

- къабзэ "clean" → къабзу "cleanly"
- жыжьэ "far" → жыжьу "far",
- псынщӀэ "quick" → псынщӀэу "quickly",
- дахэ "beautiful" → даху "beautifully",
- благъэ "near" → благъу "nearly".
- лъэщ "powerful" → лъэщу "powerfully".
- щабэ "soft" → щабу "softly"
- быдэ "firm" → быду "firmly"

щӀалэр жыжьу жащ
щӀалэ-р жыжь-у ж-ащ
[ɕʼaːɮar ʒəʑəw ʒaːɕ]
boy.ABS far.ADV {(s)he ran}
"The boy ran far."

щӀалэм шхыныр дэгъу ищӀащ
щӀалэ-м шхын-ыр дэгъу-у ищӀ-ащ
[ɕʼaːɮam ʃxənər daʁʷəw jəɕʼaːɕ]
{the boy.ERG} food.ABS excellently {(s)he done it}
"The boy done the food excellently."

пщащэр даху матхэ
пщащэ-р дах-у матхэ
[pɕaːɕar daːxəw maːtxa]
{the girl.ABS} beautifully {(s)he writes}
"The girl writes beautifully."

== Conjunctions ==
In English, the word "and" is used to connect various parts of speech. In Kabardian, there are different ways (suffixes) to connect words depending on their part of speech and definiteness.

Category	Suffix	Example
Indefinite nouns	-рэ /ra/	ЩӀалэ-рэ пщащэ-рэ къэкӀуахэщ. "A boy and a girl came."
Definite nouns	-мрэ /mra/	ЩӀалэ-мрэ пщащэ-мрэ къэкӀуахэщ. "The boy and the girl came."
Pronouns	-рэ /ra/	Сэ-рэ уэ-рэ дыкӀуащ. "You and I went."
Indefinite adjectives	-ри /ri/	ЩӀалэ кӀыхьэ-ри пщащэ дахэ-ри къэкӀуахэщ. "A tall boy and a pretty girl came."
Definite adjectives	-мри /mri/	ЩӀалэ кӀыхьэ-мри пщащэ дахэ-мри къэкӀуахэщ. "The tall boy and the pretty girl came."
Numbers	-рэ /ra/	ЩӀалэ тӀу-рэ пщащэ щы-рэ къэкӀуахэщ. "Two boys and three girls came."
Universal nouns	-и /i/	ЩӀал-и пщащ-и къэкӀуахэщ. "Boys and girls came."
Adverbs	-мкӀи /mt͡ʃʼi/	Махуэ-мкӀи жэщы-мкӀи къэкӀуахэщ. "They came in the day and in the night."

The independent conjunction ыкӀи /ət͡ʃəj/ ("and") can also be used to connect different parts of speech.

- Verbs: ЩӀалэр йоджэ ыкӀи матхэ. ("The boy reads and writes.")
- Adjectives: ЩӀалэр дахэ ыкӀи кӀыхьэ. ("The boy is handsome and tall.")

Conjunctions in the Circassian language play the same role like in English, they are used to connect together, in different ways, words or parts of a difficult sentence. According to structure of Circassian conjunctions they can be separated into two groups: simple and complex.

=== Simple conjunctions ===
Among simple Circassian conjunctions are:

- ыкӀи – "and".
- е – "or".
- ауэ – "but".

Сэ сыкӀуащ къалэм, ауэ къэзгъэзэжакъым
[sa səkʷʼaːɕ qaːɮam aːwa qazʁazaʒaːqəm]
I {I went} city.ERG but {I didn't return}
"I went to the city, but I haven't returned."

=== Complex conjunctions ===
- арщхьэкӀэ – "because".
- aтӀэ – "in spite of".
- хьэмэ – "or".
- сыту – "as".
- щхьэкӀэ – "though".
- сыт щхьэкӀэ – "because (of) / why".
- папщӀэ – "for".
- папщӀэкӀэ – "as".
- щыгъуэ – "when".
- зэ-зэ – "first…then".
- е-е – "either-or".
- къудейуэ – "as soon as".
- ару – "just".
- пэтми – "although".
- щытмэ – "if".
- ипкъ иткӀэ – "therefore".
- къыхэкӀкӀэ – "because / that’s why".

== Particles ==
In the Circassian language participles are different both by their semantics and structure. Semantically they fall into the following groups: affirmative, negative, interrogative, intensive, indicatory and stimulating.

- дыдэ – "quite, very".
- уеблэмэ – "even".
- пIэрэ – "whether, really".
- мис – "here".
- мес – "there (near by)".
- кхъы1э – "please".
- нэхъ – "more".
- нэхърэ – "more than".
- хьэуэ – "no".
- нтIэ – "yes".
- акъудей (аркъудей) – "quite not".
- къудей – "just now".

== Postpositions ==
In the Circassian language, as well as in other Ibero-Caucasian languages, role of prepositions belongs to postpositions. It is difficult to define the exact count of postpositions in the Circassian language, because even such major parts of speech as nouns (from the point of view of their functionality) sometimes can be included into the group, together with some verb prefixes. For example, in the sentence Тхылъыр столым телъ "The book is lying on the table" the noun has no preposition, but the meaning remains clear because in the verb те-лъ "is lying" the prefix те- expresses something's being on a surface, so this form of the verb literally means "on the surface is lying".

Nouns and adverbs sometimes play role of postpositions. For example, nous that describe different parts of human body (head, nose, side and so on) sometimes function as postpositions. For example: Фызыр лӀым ипэ иту кӀуащ "The wife went in front of the husband" (the preposition "in front of" in the Circassian sentence is expressed by the phrase ипэ иту "being in front of his nose").

Nouns and pronouns combine with a postposition in the ergative grammatical case only. For example, the postposition деж "near, beside" requires a word in the ergative case:

- жыгы-м деж "near the tree".

Postpositions can attach possessive prefixes to themselves. For example, in singular:

- сэ с-а-деж "near me",
- о у-а-деж "near you",
- абы и деж "near him";

in plural:

- дэ д-а-деж "near us",
- фэ ф-а-деж "near you",
- ахэмэ я деж "near them".

The following words are used as postpositions in the Circassian language:

- ипIэкIэ "before".
- пщ1ондэ "before".
- щыгъуэ "during".
- икIуэцIкI "inside".
- лъандэ "since".
- къэскIэ "until".
- нэс "until".
- деж "near".
- дежкIэ "at".
- иужь "after".
- пащхьэ "in front of".
- щ1ыбагъ "behind".
- щIагъ "under".
- нэмыщI "except".
- фIэкIа "except".
- къэс "every".

== Word Formation ==
=== Compounding ===
==== Noun + Noun ====
- адэ-анэ: parents (cf. адэ: father, анэ: mother)
- джэдкъаз: domesticated bird (cf. джэд: chicken, къэз: goose)
- мэкъумэш: harvest (cf. мэкъу: hay, анэ: millet)
- мастэIуданэ: sewing kit (cf. мастэ: ??, Iуданэ: needle)
- джанэгъуэншэдж: set of clothes (cf. джанэ: shirt, гъуэншэдж: pants)

==== Noun + Verb ====
This strategy is very similar to the English one, which gives words like pickpocket, cutthroat, scarecrow.

- пхъащIэ (pχaːɕʼa): carpenter (cf. пхъэ: wood, щIэн: to do Y)
- пщэдэлъ (pɕadaɬ): scarf (cf. пщэ: wool, дэлъын: to lie at Y)
- псышэ (psəʃa): water carrier (cf. псы: water, шэн: to lead Y)

=== Derivation ===
==== -ей ====
A suffix denoting a tree.

- дей (daj): walnut/hazelnut tree (cf. дэ: nut)
- абрикосей (aːprəjkawsaj): apricot tree (cf. абрикос: apricot)
- балией (baːɮəjaj): cherry tree (cf. балий: cherry)

==== зэ- ====
- зэадэзэкъуэ (zaaːdazaqʷa): father and son
- зэанэзэпхъу (zaaːnazapχʷ): mother and daughter
- зэдэлъхузэшыпхъу (zadaɬxʷzaʃəpχʷ): brother and sister
- зэлӀзэфыз (zaɬʼzafəz): husband and wife
- зэныбжьэгъу (zanəbʑaʁʷ): friends

==== -тэ ====
This is an unproductive suffix, which creates new verbs from other verbs.

- лъэтэн (ɬatan): to fly (cf. лъэн: to jump)
- кIуэтэн (kʷʼatan): to move (cf. кIуэн: to go)
- къутэн (qʷətan): to break Y (cf. къун: to beat Y up)

== Numbers ==
- Numbers from zero to ten are specific words

1 зы [zə]
2 тӀу [tʷʼə]
3 щы [ɕə]
4 плӀы [pɬʼə]
5 тху [txʷə]
6 хы [xə]
7 блы [bɮə]
8 и [jə]
9 бгъу [bʁʷə]
10 пщӀы [pɕʼə]

- Numbers from eleven to nineteen are built with the word for ten, followed by кӀу ([kʷʼə]) and the unit digit:

11 пщӀыкӀуз [pɕʼəkʷʼəz]
12 пщӀыкӀутIу [pɕʼəkʷʼətʷʼ]
13 пщӀыкӀущ [pɕʼəkʷʼəɕ]
14 пщӀыкӀуплI [pɕʼəkʷʼəpɬʼ]
15 пщӀыкӀутху [pɕʼəkʷʼətxʷ]
16 пщӀыкӀух [pɕʼəkʷʼəx]
17 пщӀыкӀубл [pɕʼəkʷʼəbɮ]
18 пщӀыкӀуй [pɕʼəkʷʼəj]
19 пщӀыкӀубгъу [pɕʼəkʷʼəbʁʷ]}

- The tens follow a vigesimal system from forty up, with the exception of fifty:

20 тӀощӀ [tʷʼaɕʼə] (20)
21 тӀощӀэ зырэ [tʷʼaɕʼəra zəra] (20 and 1)
22 тӀощӀэ тIурэ [tʷʼaɕʼəra tʷʼəra] (20 and 2)
23 тӀощӀэ щырэ [tʷʼaɕʼəra ɕəra] (20 and 3)
...
30 щэщӀ [ɕaɕʼ] (30)
31 щэщӀрэ зырэ [ɕaɕʼra zəra] (30 and 1)
32 щэщӀрэ тIурэ [ɕaɕʼra tʷʼəra] (30 and 2)
...
40 плIыщI [pɬʼəɕʼ] (20 × 2)
50 тхущI,[txʷəɕʼ] (half-hundred)
60 хыщI,[xəɕʼ] (20 × 3)
70 блыщI [bɮəɕʼ] (20 × 3 and 10)
80 ищI [jəɕʼ] (20 × 4)
90 бгъущI [bʁʷəɕʼ] (20 × 4 and 10)

- One hundred is щэ (ɕa). The hundreds are formed by the hundred word root (щ (ɕ)) followed by -и-

(-i-) and the multiplier digit root.

100 щэ (ɕa)
101 щэрэ зырэ (ɕara zəra) (100 and 1)
110 щэрэ пщӀырэ (ɕara pʃʼəra) (100 and 10)
200 щитӀу (ɕitʷʼ) (100 × 2)
201 щитӀурэ зырэ (ɕitʷʼəra zəra) (200 × 2 and 1)
300 щищ (ɕiɕ) (100 × 3)
400 щиплӀ (ɕipɬʼ) (100 × 4)
500 щитху (ɕitxʷ) (100 × 5)
600 щих (ɕix) (100 × 6)
700 щибл (ɕibɮ) (100 × 7)
800 щий (ɕij) (100 × 8)
900 щибгъу (ɕibʁʷ) (100 × 9)

- One thousand is мин (min). The thousands are formed by the thousand word root (мин (məjn))

followed by -и- (-i-) and the multiplier digit root.

1000 мин (min)
1001 минрэ зырэ (minra zəra) (1000 and 1)
1010 минрэ пщӀырэ (minra pʃʼəra) (1000 and 10)
1100 минрэ щэрэ (minra ɕara) (1000 and 100)
2000 минитӀу (minitʷʼ) (1000 × 2)
3000 минищ (miniɕ) (1000 × 3)
4000 миниплӀ (minipɬʼ) (1000 × 4)
5000 минитху (minitxʷ) (1000 × 5)
6000 миних (minix) (1000 × 6)
7000 минибл (minibɮ) (1000 × 7)
8000 миний (minij) (1000 × 8)
9000 минибгъу (minibʁʷ) (1000 × 9)
10000 минипщӀ (minipʃʼ) (1000 × 10)
11000 минипщӀыкӀуз (minipʃʼəkʷʼəz) (1000 × 11)
12000 минипщӀыкӀутIу (minipʃʼəkʷʼətʷʼ) (1000 × 12)
20000 минитӀощӀ (minitʷʼaɕʼə) (1000 × 20)
100000 минищэ (miniɕa) (1000 × 100)
200000 минищитӀу (miniɕitʷʼ) (1000 × 200)

When composed, the hundred word takes the -рэ (-ra) suffix, as well as the ten and the unit if any (e.g.: щэрэ зырэ (ɕara zəra) [101], щэрэ тIурэ (ɕara tʷʼəra) [102], щэрэ пщӀыкӀузырэ (pʃʼəkʷʼətʷʼəra) [111], щитӀурэ щэщӀырэ плIырэ (ɕitʷʼəra ɕat͡ʃəra pɬʼəra) [234]).

=== Ordinal numbers ===
- Except апэрэ/япэрэ – first (aːpara/jaːpara) are formed by prefix я- (jaː-) and suffix – нэрэ (- nara). For

example: ятIунэрэ – second (jaːtʷʼənara), ящынэрэ – third (jaːɕənara), яплIынэрэ – fourth (jaːpɬʼənara).

first – Япэ [jaːpa]
second – ЕтIуанэ [jatʼaːna]
third – Ещанэ [jaɕaːna]
firth – Еянэ [jajaːna]
tenth – ЕпщIанэ [japɕʼaːna]
eleventh – ЕпщыкIузанэ [japɕʼəkʷʼəzaːna]
sixteenth. – ЕпщыкIуханэ [japɕʼəkʷʼəxaːna]

=== Discrete numbers ===
Зырыз – in ones, one by one
ТIурытI – in twos, two by two
Щырыщ – in threes, three by three
ПлIырыплI – in fours, four by four
Тхурытху – in fives, five by five
Хырых – in sixes, six by six
Блырыбл – in sevens, seven by seven
Ири – in eights, eight by eight
Бгъурыбгъу – in nines, nine by nine
ПщIырыпщI – in tens, ten by ten

=== Fractional numbers ===
half (1÷2) – Ныкъуэ [nəqʷa]
one third (1÷3) – щанэ [ɕaːna]
two thirds (2÷3) – щанитӀу [ɕaːnitʷʼ] (1÷3 × 2)
one fourth (1÷4) – плӀанэ [pɬʼaːna]
two fourths (2÷4) – плӀанитӀу [pɬʼaːnitʷʼ] (1÷4 × 2)
three fourths (3÷4) – плӀанищ [pɬʼaːniɕ] (1÷4 × 3)
one fifth (1÷5) – тфанэ [tfaːna]
one sixth (1÷6) – ханэ [xaːna]
one seventh (1÷7) – бланэ [blaːna]
one eighth (1÷8) – янэ [jaːna]
one ninth (1÷9) – бгъуанэ [bʁʷaːna]
one tenth (1÷10) – пщӀанэ [pʃʼaːna]
one eleventh (1÷11) – пщӀыкӀузанэ [pʃʼəkʷʼəzaːna]
one twelfth (1÷12) – пщӀыкӀутӀуанэ [pʃʼəkʷʼətʷʼaːna]
one twentieth (1÷20) – тӀощӀанэ [tʷʼaɕʼaːna]
one hundredth (1÷100) – щанэ [ɕaːna]

== See also ==
- Kabardian language
- Circassia
- Circassians
