= Yaroslav Melnyk (philologist) =

University Professor Melnyk Yaroslav Hryhorovych
- Мельник Ярослав Григорович
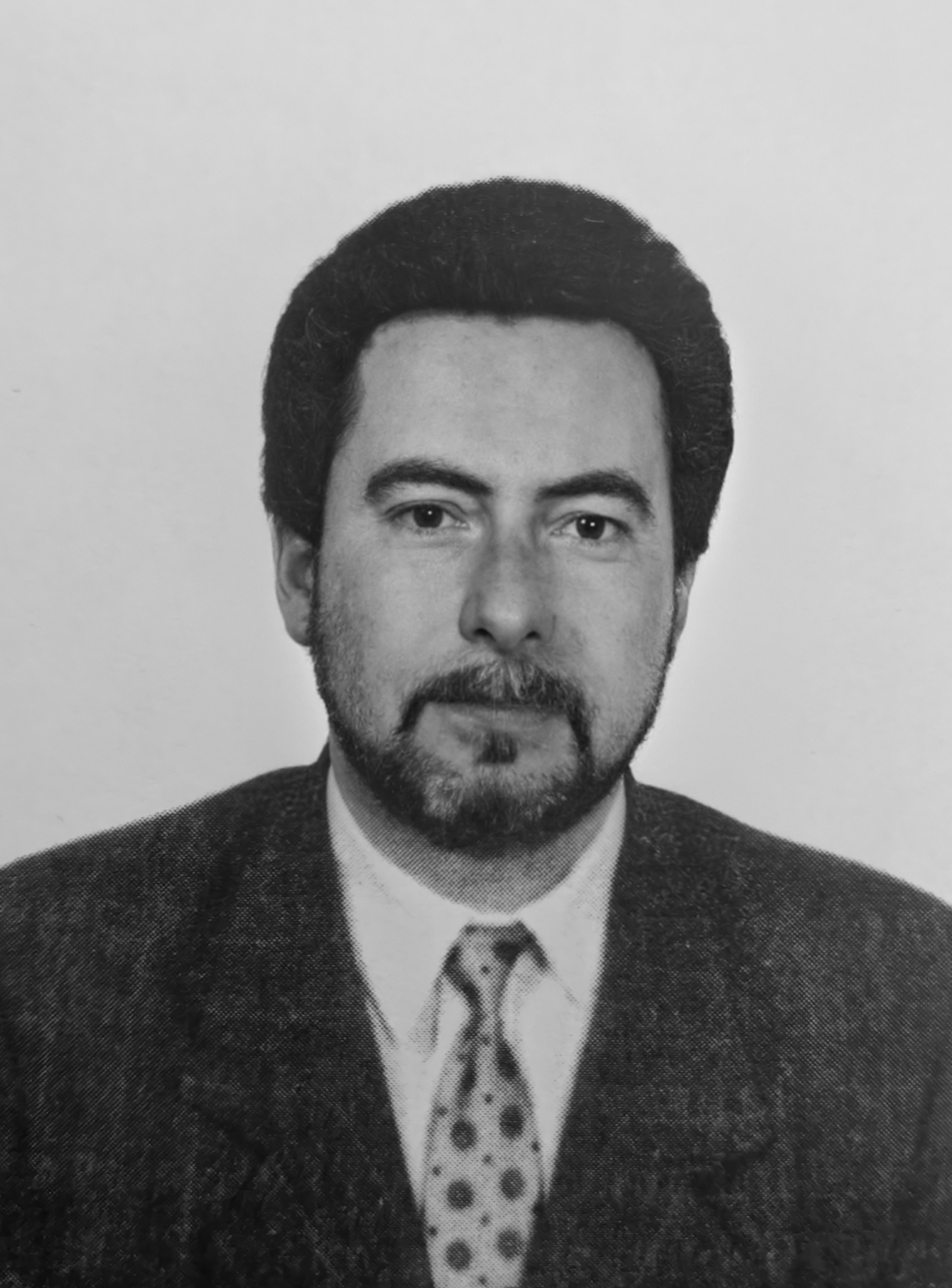
- Melnyk Yaroslav in 2000
- Born: June 1960 (age 65); Ivano-Frankivsk, Ukrainian SSR, Soviet Union
- Education: Doctor of philology
- Employer: Vasyl Stefanyk Precarpathian National University

Yaroslav Melnyk (born June 1960 in Ivano-Frankivsk, Soviet Union) is a Ukrainian philologist, linguist, Slavic scholar, and doctor of philology. In November 2014 he received the title of professor at Vasyl Stefanyk Precarpathian National University, Department of General and German Linguistics. Also in 2014, he received the Medal of Pushkin from the President of the Russian Federation for a major contribution to strengthening cooperation and developing scientific and cultural relations.

== Biography ==
Yaroslav Hryhorovych Melnyk was born in 1960 in Ivano-Frankivsk, Ukraine. He graduated as an artist-designer, studied polytechnics in Kharkiv, and later on also studied at the Faculty of Physics and Mathematics. In 1986 he graduated from the Faculty of Philology of the Ivano-Frankivsk Pedagogical Institute. In 1994 he graduated within the minimum period of studies and successfully defended his dissertation. During his career he did academic internships at the University of Łódz (Poland), the Maria Curie-Skłodowska University (Poland), the Jagiellonian University (Poland), Moscow State University, Saint Petersburg State University, Yaroslavl State University (Russia).

He is often an official member of the examination board for dissertations in specialized councils of various universities, is a member of various educational, cultural and scientific commissions, co-organizer of the International Scientific Conference "Semantics of Language and Text". Melnyk Yaroslav is the author of more than 200 publications (including more than 5 monographs, 30 textbooks and manuals) on the problems of linguistics, linguistic philosophy, semiotics, culturology. His doctoral dissertation is devoted to modern problems of linguistics, micro- and macrosystem levels in language, linguoculturology, semiology, linguoanthropological philosophy, neo-rhetoric studies. He founded the discussion student-graduate club "Dialogue". From 1988 for 28 years he organized the work of student volunteers, including for the collection of local folklore, dialect words and expressions in the Mikhaylovskoye Museum Reserve, the consequent reports and materials were annually submitted to the museums.

In 2012, he held a photo exhibition "My Ukraine" at the Pushkin State Museum-Reserve "Mikhailovskoe" archive. Melnyk Yaroslav is a frequent guest of Olena Tretyak's program "European Vector" on the TV channel Vezha. He was also a co-host of the popular science program "The Universe Around Us."

== Honors ==
For his scientific, pedagogical and cultural achievements Melnyk Yarowlav was awarded the Diploma of the Ministry of Education and Science of Ukraine (2008), the medal and honorary award of the Ministry of Education and Science of Ukraine for "Excellence in Education" (2010), the medal and the All-Russian Prize "Heritage Guardians" (2012 p.)

== Literature ==
1. Subjectivity as a language category.– Ivano-Frankivsk: Play, 1997. - 130 p.
2. Subjectivity as a language category. // View. 2nd, stereotype.– Ivano-Frankivsk: Play, 1998. –130 p
3. Semiotic analysis of Trypillia-Kukuten sign systems (painted ware) .– Ivano-Frankivsk, Play, 2000.– 237 p.
4. Elementary logic. Training manual. - Ivano-Frankivsk: Play, 2005. - 67 p.
5. The wisdom of African peoples. - Ivano-Frankivsk: Play, 2005. - 98 p.
6. Prolegomenos to the Ukrainian discourse: ethnocultural, political and linguistic-semiotic aspect. - Ivano-Frankivsk, 2012. - 260 pp.
7. Church Slavonic language / Ed. 4th, revised and supplemented. - Ivano-Frankivsk: Symphony forte, 2017. - 252 p
8. Logic and ethics. Linguo-communicative element / 2nd edition, revised and supplemented. Ivano-Frankivsk: Symphony-Forte. 120 p.
9. Speechwriting: methodical materials / Ivano-Frankivsk: SHEI "Vasyl Stefanyk Precarpathian National University", 2019. - 140 p. (8.14 pp.) ISBN 978-966-640-464-3
10. Errors in the system of traditional logic / Ivano-Frankivsk: Vasyl Stefanyk Precarpathian National University, 2019. - 180 p. (6.28 pp.). ISBN 978-966-640-467-4
