= Yaroslav Lahuta =

Ukrainian politician

- Ярослав Лагута

Governor of Zhytomyr Oblast (acting)
- In office 24 June 2019 – 8 August 2019
- Preceded by: Ihor Hundych
- Succeeded by: Vitaliy Bunechko

Personal details
- Born: Yaroslav Mykolayovych Lahuta; 11 July 1975 (age 50) Zhytomyr, Ukraine, Soviet Union
- Party: European Solidarity

Yaroslav Mykolayovych Lahuta (Ukrainian: Ярослав Миколайович Лагута; born on 11 July 1975), is a Ukrainian politician who is currently the head of the Darnytsia district state administration in Kyiv since 18 May 2020.

He was the acting governor of Zhytomyr Oblast in the summer of 2019.

He was a member of the Youth Party of Ukraine, the UDAR party and the European Solidarity party. He is the PhD in Economics as of 2018.

== Biography ==
Yaroslav Lahuta was born in Zhytomyr on 11 July 1975.

From 1992 to 1998 he studied at the Zhytomyr Engineering and Technical Institute with a degree in management in the industrial sector.

From October 1993 to December 1996 he was a department inspector, and later a deputy director at ASTRA.

Between January 1997 to December 2001, he worked as deputy director of the Zhytomyr department of the ASKA insurance company.

In 1998, he graduated from the Zhytomyr University of Engineering and Technology.

From 1998 to 2001 he taught at the Zhytomyr Institute of Engineering and Technology and the Zhytomyr Institute of Entrepreneurship and Modern Technologies.

He had led the marketing services agency Smart Communications and the group of companies Trading House Yarko.

From January to May 2002, he was the director, and later promoted as the general director of the Kyiv company Machine Sales.

In the 2002 parliamentary elections, Lahuta ran in the 66th constituency (Zhytomyr Oblast) from the Our Ukraine party and was a member of the Youth Party of Ukraine. Lahuta took 11th place out of 14 contenders with a score of 0.62% of the vote.

From June 2002 to January 2005 he held senior positions in the company Schultz and Friends Kyiv, and from February 2005 to December 2007 he was the director of Orange Ukraine.

In January 2008, he became an advisor to the director of Smart Communications for business development, remaining in this capacity until November 2014.

In 2012, Lahuta ran for the Verkhovna Rada on the lists of the UDAR party, but was not elected to parliament. From 2012 to 2014, on a paid basis, he was an assistant to the People's Deputy Rustam Raupov from UDAR.

In August 2014, he was a candidate for the position of Deputy Chairman of the Zhytomyr Regional State Administration for Humanitarian Affairs. At the same time, Lahuta promised to work in this position for free until the end of the anti-terrorist operation in eastern Ukraine.

From November 2014 to January 2015, he was an Advisor to the patronage service of the head of the Zhytomyr Regional State Administration. On 15 January 2015, he Governor of Zhytomyr Oblast, Serhiy Mashkovskyi appointed Lahuta as his deputy.

On 9 February 2015, he became a member of the Public Humanitarian Council under the Zhytomyr Regional State Administration. At the same time, he re replaced Raupov as head of the Zhytomyr branch of the UDAR party.

During the 2015 local elections, he ran for the Zhytomyr Oblast Council from the Petro Poroshenko Bloc "Solidarity" party, but was not elected.

In 2018, he graduated from the National Academy of Public Administration under the President of Ukraine and defended his PhD thesis.

In February 2019, Governor Ihor Hundych, reprimanded deputy governor Lahuta, for improper performance of official duties.

On 24 June 2019, Lahuta became the acting Governor of Zhytomr Oblast. He was replaced by Vitaliy Bunechko on 8 August.

On 7 October 2019, Lahuta wrote a letter of resignation from the post of Deputy Chairman of the Zhytomyr Regional State Administration.

On 12 November 2019, he became the acting head of the Darnytsia District State Administration, while at the same time, the Deputy Chairman of the Darnytsia District State Administration in Kyiv.

On 18 May 2020, President of Ukraine Volodymyr Zelenskyy appointed Lahuta as chairman of the Darnytsia District State Administration on a permanent basis.

== Family ==
He is married, and has a son and a daughter.
