= Yaroslav Lopatynskyi =

Ukrainian mathematician

Yaroslav Borysovych Lopatynskyi (1906–1981) was a Soviet mathematician. Born in Tbilisi, Lopatinskii acquired wide acclaim for his contributions to the theory of differential equations. He is especially known for his condition of stability for boundary-value problems in elliptic equations and for initial boundary-value problems in evolution PDEs.

== See also ==
- Lev Lopatinsky

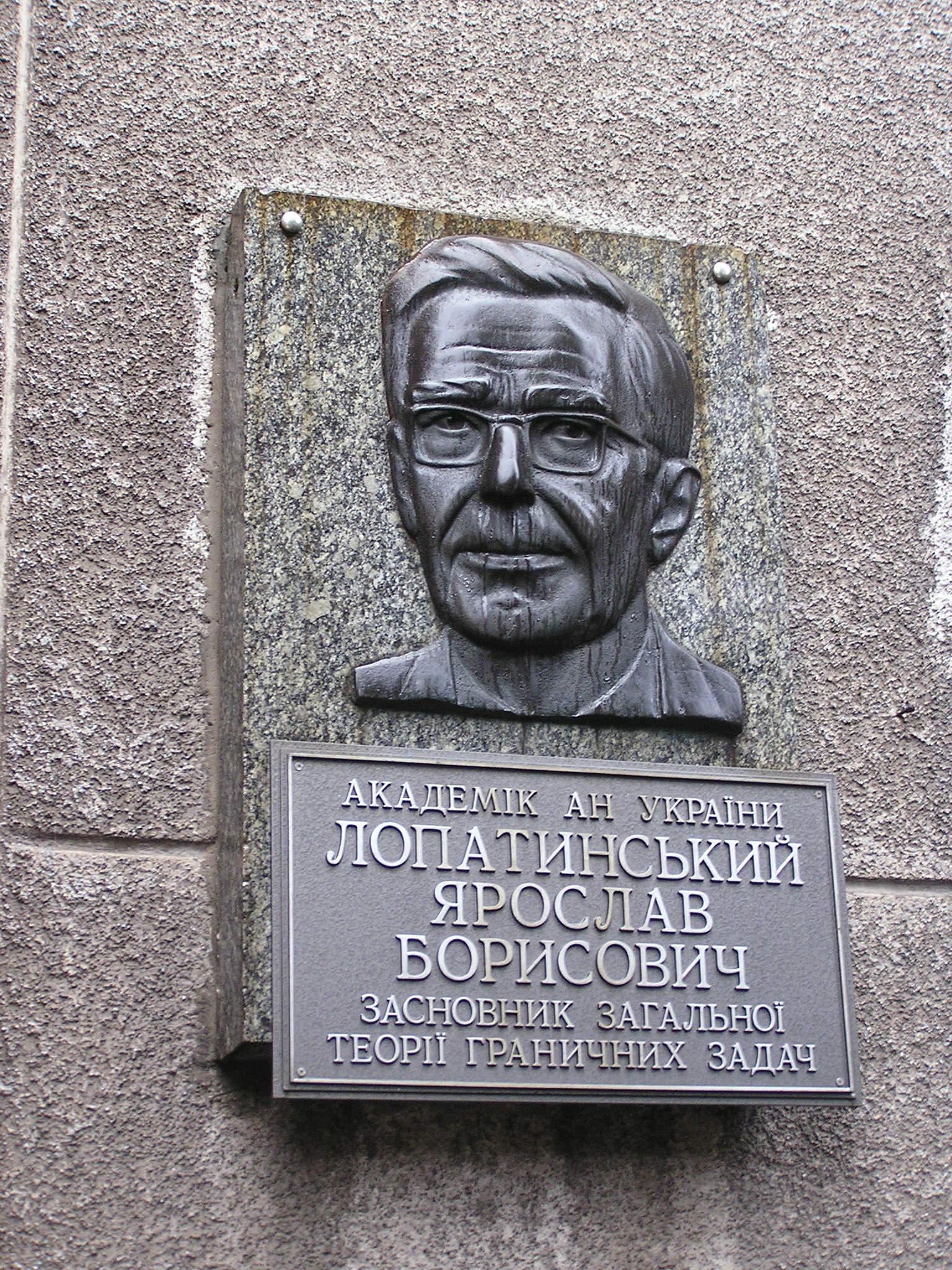
Yaroslav Lopatynskyi, memorial.
