= Yaroslav Onyshchuk =

Ukrainian archaeologist, historian, scientist (born 1967)

- Ярослав Іванович Онищук
- Born: Yaroslav Ivanovych Onyshchuk; 4 June 1967 (age 59); Popivtsi, Lviv Oblast, Ukrainian SSR (now Ukraine)
- Education: University of Lviv

Yaroslav Onyshchuk (Ukrainian: Ярослав Іванович Онищук; born 4 June 1967) is a Ukrainian archaeologist, historian, scientist. Doctor of Historical Science (2019).

== Biography ==
Yaroslav Onyshchuk was born on 4 June 1967 in Popivtsi, now the Pidkamin Hromada of Zolochiv Raion, Lviv Oblast, Ukraine.

In 1991, he graduated from the Faculty of History of Ivan Franko University of Lviv. He worked as the executive secretary of the Brody District Organization of the Ukrainian Society for the Protection of Historical and Cultural Monuments (1991–1992); junior (1992–1994), senior (1993–1998) researcher at the Brody Local History Department of the Lviv Historical Museum.

From 1995 at his Alma Mater: postgraduate student, docent (1999), associate professor (1999), doctoral candidate, chief (2021) of the Department of Archaeology and History of Ancient Civilizations.

Deputy Director of the memorial and search enterprise of the Lviv Regional Council "Dolia". Co-founder and head of the public organization "Society for the Search for War Victims "Pamiat" (2005-2007).

== Scientific achievements ==
He is the author of more than 200 scientific and popular science works on archeology and history of Ukraine.

Monographs:

- "Naselennia Zakhidnoi Volyni ta Zakhidnoho Podillia u pershii polovyni I tys. n. e.: kulturno-istorychnyi aspekt" (2018);
- "Cherniakhivske poselennia Hliadky u verkhivi Pivdennoho Buhu" (2004, co-author);
- "Ukrainski sichivi striltsi. Zbirnyk istorychnykh fotohrafii u shesty trmatychnykh zbirkakh" (2003, compiler).

He studied archaeological sites of Roman times in the upper reaches of the rivers Ikva (Dudyn II, Nakvasha I), Styr (Brody I, Sukhovolia I, IV), Seret (Malynyshche I), and Western Bug (Kariv I, XIII).

Research interests: archaeology of Ukraine, ethnic history and archaeology of the Roman period, military archaeology of the modern period.
