= Yaroslavsky (inhabited locality) =

Yaroslavsky (Russian: Яросла́вский; masculine), Yaroslavskaya (Яросла́вская; feminine), or Yaroslavskoye (Яросла́вское; neuter) is the name of several inhabited localities in Russia.

== Urban localities ==
- Yaroslavsky, Primorsky Krai, an urban-type settlement in Khorolsky District of Primorsky Krai

== Rural localities ==
- Yaroslavsky, Sakha Republic, a selo in Yaroslavsky Rural Okrug of Lensky District of the Sakha Republic
- Yaroslavskoye, Kaliningrad Oblast, a settlement in Dobrinsky Rural Okrug of Guryevsky District of Kaliningrad Oblast
- Yaroslavskoye, Kurgan Oblast, a selo in Yaroslavsky Selsoviet of Pritobolny District of Kurgan Oblast
- Yaroslavskaya (rural locality), a stanitsa in Mostovsky District of Krasnodar Krai
