= Yaroslav Plechiy =

Ukrainian footballer

Personal information
- Full name: Yaroslav Oleksandrovych Plechiy
- Date of birth: 21 May 1999 (age 27)
- Place of birth: Sumy, Ukraine
- Height: 1.75 m (5 ft 9 in)
- Position: Right back

Youth career
- 2012–2016: Metalist Kharkiv

Senior career*
Years	Team	Apps	(Gls)
2016	Metalist Kharkiv	0	(0)
2016–2018	Zorya Luhansk	0	(0)
2018–2019	Olimpik Donetsk	0	(0)
2019–2020	Avanhard Kramatorsk	2	(0)
2019–2020	→ Avanhard-2 Kramatorsk	17	(0)
2021	Krystal Kherson	9	(0)
2021	VPK-Ahro Shevchenkivka	1	(0)
- * Club domestic league appearances and goals as of 6 October 2021

Yaroslav Oleksandrovych Plechiy (Ukrainian: Ярослав Олександрович Плечій; born 21 May 1999) is a Ukrainian professional footballer who plays as a right back.
