= Yaroslav Shkurko =

Belarusian footballer

Personal information
- Date of birth: 8 February 1991 (age 35)
- Place of birth: Kerch, Ukrainian SSR
- Height: 1.67 m (5 ft 5 1/2 in)
- Position: Midfielder

Team information
- Current team: Maxline
- Number: 16

Youth career
- 2001–2006: Youth Sport School Kerch
- 2007–2008: Darida Minsk Raion

Senior career*
Years	Team	Apps	(Gls)
2009–2011	Zvezda-BGU Minsk	50	(8)
2011–2014	Smolevichi-STI	107	(12)
2015–2016	Slavia Mozyr	52	(4)
2017	Naftan Novopolotsk	13	(0)
2017–2018	Belshina Bobruisk	53	(5)
2020–	Maxline	90	(7)
- * Club domestic league appearances and goals as of 31 December 2023

Yaroslav Shkurko (Belarusian: Яраслаў Шкурко; Russian: Ярослав Шкурко; born 8 February 1991) is a Belarusian professional footballer who plays for Maxline.
