= Yaroslav Voronkov =

Russian footballer (born 2003)

Personal information
- Full name: Yaroslav Valeryevich Voronkov
- Date of birth: 11 September 2003 (age 23)
- Place of birth: Luhansk, Ukraine
- Height: 1.75 m (5 ft 9 in)
- Position: Defender

Youth career
- 2019–2020: FC Zorya Luhansk
- 2020: FC Krasnodonuhol Krasnodon
- 2020–2021: FC Akademiya Futbola Rostov-on-Don

Senior career*
Years	Team	Apps	(Gls)
2021	FC SKA Rostov-on-Don	15	(0)
2021	FC SKA-Khabarovsk-2	7	(0)
2021	FC SKA-Khabarovsk	1	(0)
2022	FC Baltika Kaliningrad	0	(0)
2022–2023	FC Baltika-BFU Kaliningrad	24	(0)
2023–2024	FC SKA Rostov-on-Don	11	(0)
2026	FC Zarya Lugansk	0	(0)
- * Club domestic league appearances and goals as of 2 May 2026

Yaroslav Valeryevich Voronkov (Russian: Ярослав Валерьевич Воронков; born 11 September 2003) is a Russian professional football player.

== Club career ==
He made his debut in the Russian Football National League for FC SKA-Khabarovsk on 5 September 2021 in a game against FC Spartak-2 Moscow.
