= Yaroslavl (inhabited locality) =

Yaroslavl (Russian: Ярославль) is the name of several inhabited localities in Russia.

Urban localities

- Yaroslavl, a city in Yaroslavl Oblast

Rural localities

- Yaroslavl, Kirov Oblast (58°34′51″N 50°32′27″E), a village in Zakarinsky Rural Okrug of Slobodskoy District in Kirov Oblast
- Yaroslavl, Smolensk Oblast (54°35′36″N 33°13′49″E), a village under the administrative jurisdiction of Yelninskoye Urban Settlement in Yelninsky District of Smolensk Oblast

== See also ==
- Yaroslavsky (disambiguation)
