= 107th Rifle Division =

107th Rifle Division (August 19, 1939 – September 26, 1941) 107th Rifle Division (April 17, 1942 – July 1945)
- Active: 1939–1945
- Country: Soviet Union
- Branch: Red Army (1939-46)
- Type: Infantry
- Size: Division
- Engagements: Battle of Smolensk (1941); Yelnya offensive Case Blue; Battle of Voronezh (1942); Ostrogozhsk–Rossosh offensive Voronezh–Kastornoye offensive Operation Star; Third Battle of Kharkov; Battle of Kursk; Battle of Prokhorovka; Operation Roland; Battle of Kiev (1943); Zhitomir–Berdichev offensive Proskurov-Chernivtsi offensive Lvov-Sandomierz Offensive; Vistula–Oder offensive Lower Silesian offensive Upper Silesian offensive Moravia–Ostrava offensive Prague offensive
- Decorations: Order of Suvorov (2nd Formation)
- Battle honours: Kremenets (2nd Formation)

Commanders
- Notable commanders: Col. Pavel Vasilevich Mironov; Col. Dmitrii Feoktisovich Dremin; Maj. Gen. Pyotr Maksimovich Bezhko; Col. Vasilii Yakovlevich Petrenko

The 107th Rifle Division was first formed as an infantry division of the Red Army in August 1939, in the Siberian Military District, based on the shtat (table of organization and equipment) of the following month. Following the German invasion it was moved west and concentrated west of Moscow as part of 24th Army in early July. Late that month the Army was assigned to Reserve Front. By that time the 107th had already been in combat with leading elements of 2nd Panzer Group in the Yelnya area. In mid-August it formed part of the Army's northern strike group in the first attempt to encircle and destroy the German forces in the salient that they held around that place, and also in the second attempt that began on August 30. On September 6 Yelnya was retaken after the XX Army Corps was forced out of the salient. The 107th was pulled back to the Reserve of the Supreme High Command and on September 26 was redesignated as the 5th Guards Rifle Division.

A new 107th was formed on the basis of a rifle brigade In the Moscow Military District on April 17, 1942. It was soon assigned to 3rd Reserve Army, which became 60th Army on July 10, as the division moved south to the vicinity of Voronezh and joined the Voronezh Front. It took part in fighting near that place during the rest of the month, then remained on the defense as the main battles moved toward Stalingrad. Following the November counteroffensive there the division, now part of 40th Army, took part in the offensive toward Ostrogozhsk and Rossosh in mid-January, 1943. Immediately after it also participated in the offensive that drove the German and Hungarian forces away from Voronezh. As this victory was exploited the division advanced toward Belgorod and just missed being swept up in Army Group South's counteroffensive before the front stabilized. Prior to the Battle of Kursk the 107th was transferred to 69th Army and fought under that command, mostly in second echelon. It also played a secondary role in the offensive that retook Belgorod and later Kharkiv, after which it briefly transferred to 53rd Army of Steppe Front before moving into the Reserve of the Supreme High Command for a substantial rebuilding, returning to the fighting front south of Kyiv in mid-November as part of 1st Ukrainian Front's 1st Guards Army. During the spring offensives into western Ukraine the division was transferred to 38th Army, but was under direct command of the Front when it won a battle honor in March 1944. After brief service in 13th Army it returned to 60th Army where it remained for the duration of the war. During the Lvov-Sandomierz offensive it played a leading role in the elimination of the German forces encircled near Brody, then advanced toward the Polish frontier. In January 1945 the 107th participated in the capture of Kraków before moving into Silesia. During the campaign in upper Silesia the division took part in the storming of Ratibor and the elimination of the encircled German forces in that area; it would later be awarded the Order of Suvorov, 2nd Degree. Following this it transferred with its Army to 4th Ukrainian Front in Czechoslovakia, and ended the war advancing on Prague. After the shooting stopped it returned to Poland where it was disbanded in July.

== 1st Formation ==
The original 107th was formed on August 19 at Barnaul in the Siberian Military District, based on the 131st Rifle Regiment of the 78th Rifle Division. As it was formed in the Altai Krai it carried the familiar name "Altaisk" for the duration of its existence. Col. Pavel Vasilevich Mironov was appointed to command on the day it began forming; he had most recently served as deputy commander of the 28th Mountain Rifle Division. Once completed its order of battle was as follows:

- 586th Rifle Regiment (stationed at Biysk)
- 630th Rifle Regiment (stationed at Barnaul)
- 765th Rifle Regiment (stationed at Rubtsovsk)
- 347th Artillery Regiment
- 508th Howitzer Artillery Regiment
- 203rd Antitank Battalion
- 288th Antiaircraft Battalion
- 160th Reconnaissance Battalion
- 188th Sapper Battalion
- 167th Signal Battalion
- 136th Medical/Sanitation Battalion
- 144th Chemical Defense (Anti-gas) Platoon
- 147th Motor Transport Battalion
- 155th Motorized Field Bakery
- 163rd Divisional Veterinary Hospital
- 486th Field Postal Station
- 243rd Field Office of the State Bank

Mironov was sent to the Frunze Military Academy for commander's refresher courses in November 1940 and was still there at the outbreak of war with Germany. The 107th was now part of 53rd Rifle Corps, along with the 178th and 133rd Rifle Divisions. This Corps was assigned to 24th Army in the Reserve of the STAVKA High Command. The 107th began moving west from Siberia by rail in late June, and by the start of July was concentrating west of Moscow, in the area of Dorogobuzh, Gzhatsk, and Mozhaysk.

== Battles for Yelnya ==
On July 16 the 10th Panzer Division of XXXXVI Motorized Corps began advancing on Yelnya from Mstsislaw in order to start an outer encirclement ring around the Soviet armies that were nearly pocketed at Smolensk. It reached the outskirts of Yelnya in the evening of July 18 and took the town two days later after heavy fighting. Meanwhile its corps-mate, 2nd SS Reich Division was attempting to reach the Dniepr River and take Dorogobuzh before linking up with 17th Panzer Division at Yartsevo. This led to three days of fighting with the 107th and 50th Rifle Divisions; Reich failed to take either objective and was forced to fall back to positions northwest of Yelnya.

Army Gen. G. K. Zhukov took command of Reserve Front on July 30, to which 24th Army had been assigned several days earlier. On August 5, in a housecleaning operation, his chief of staff, Maj. Gen. P. I. Lyapin, sent detailed instructions to the Army's commander, Maj. Gen. K. I. Rakutin, on the correct employment of artillery. These included:

- Construct an artillery defensive system in 107th RD's sector to be prepared to repel possible attacks by enemy motor-mechanized units toward Dorogobuzh from the south and southwest.
- Deploy at least twenty guns from 533rd [Antitank Regiment, reinforcing the 107th] along the line of Hills 232.5, 256.9, 240.6, 246.9 and 206.0 to close off the main axes of possible enemy movement.
- The remaining artillery of 107th RD must be ready for action against enemy motor-mechanized units toward the south and southwest. The artillery group, which is operating on the front of 100th and 103rd Divisions, must be ready for action against enemy motor-mechanized forces from the west and southwest...

At 0216 hours on August 6 ordered Zhukov and Rakutin to put these considerations into practice by attacking and destroying the German forces in the Yelnya salient. Colonel Mironov was reinforced with what remained of the 102nd Tank Division and two artillery regiments. His force was to attack from the area of Dubovezhe and Ivanovskie Farm, 13km north-northwest of Yelnya and push south toward Viazovka, Gurevo, Lysovka, and Leonidovo, 7km west of Yelnya. The division launched its attack on the morning of August 8 against part of German XX Army Corps. It was able to advance 7-9km in the face of German artillery, armor, and infantry, including elements of the Der Führer Regiment of the Reich Division, but made no further progress. Rakutin critiqued Mironov and the commanders of the 100th, 102nd, and 19th Rifle Divisions:

1. Combat during the first half of 8 August 1941 demonstrated that, in spite of our clear superiority, especially in the sectors of 107th and 100th RDs, the advance of our units was extremely slow. In two hours of fighting, 107th RD advanced 2 kilometres and 100th RD approximately 1.5-2 kilometres in three hours. The remaining divisions are marking time in place and, while not moving forward, with countless complaints about intense enemy fire.

Rakutin's military commissar also communicated with the 107th's commissar and the 106th Motorized Division describing "numerous disciplinary problems". Zhukov added his weight the next day, berating Mironov and his other division commanders for "gross neglect if not outright incompetence."

Rakutin and Zhukov pressed relentlessly for results, and during August 12-14 the combined 107th, 100th, and 102nd Tanks, striking at the boundary between Reich and the 15th Infantry Division, gained up to 4km, taking the villages of Gorovitsy, Luginovo, and Novoe Brykino, albeit at the cost of heavy casualties. However, 24th Army's remaining divisions made no progress at all. German casualties were also high, and the commander of XX Corps, Gen. F. Materna, appealed for help from Army Group Center, stating "[h]e had only one battalion in reserve" and "El'nia could not be held in the long term." 15th Infantry had suffered 2,351 losses in just the previous week's fighting. A report from August 16 states that the 107th was attacking toward Bezzabot Sovkhoz, 12km northwest of Yelnya, on that date. Two days later the STAVKA directed Zhukov to replace the 100th with the 103rd, and add the 19th Division for a supporting attack directly north of Yelnya. Zhukov in turn directed Rakutin to make his main attack with the 107th, the "rested and refitted" 102nd, and the remnants of 105th Tank Division, again toward Leonidovo. Three further days of heavy fighting brought no further progress, and at 0445 hours on August 21, Zhukov finally informed Stalin that continuing the offensive would be futile without pausing for further rest, refitting, and training. Stalin approved later that day. On August 30 the 107th was reinforced with a regiment of the 127th Rifle Division and part of the 102nd Tanks.

=== Second offensive ===
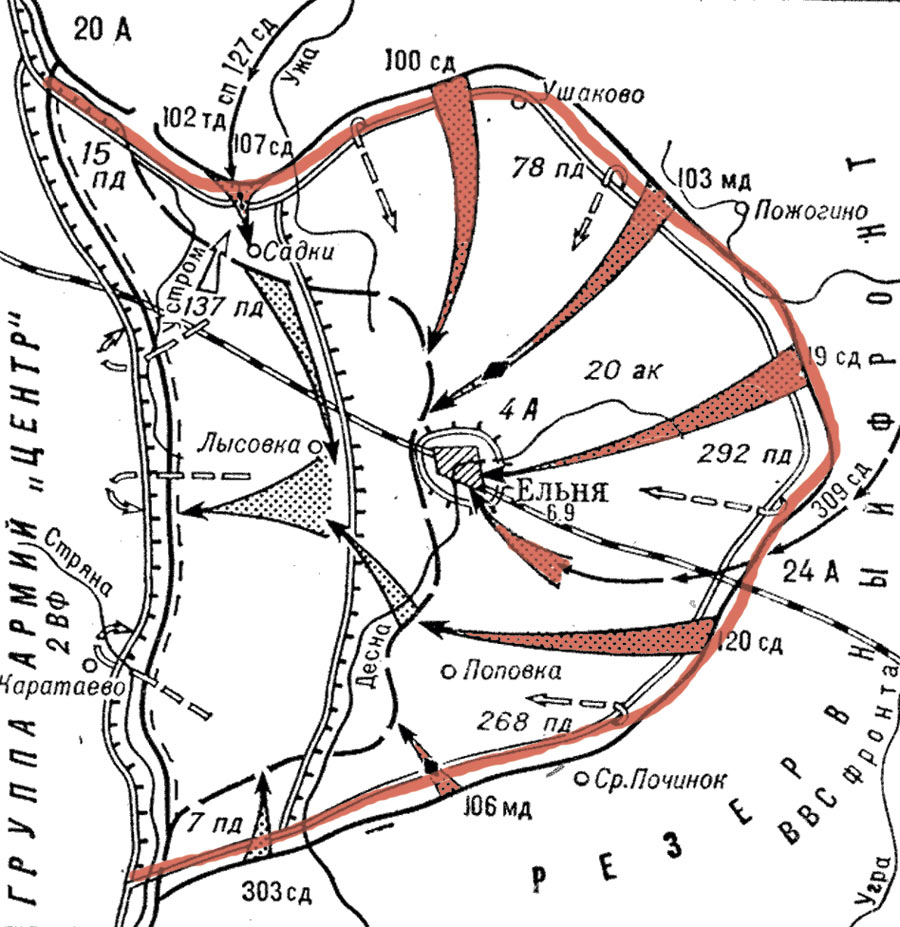
Battle of Yelnya, August 30 - September 8, 1941. Note initial position of the 107th.

On the same day Reserve Front began its new offensive against the salient, which would involve 24th and 43rd Armies. The 107th was positioned north of Spas-Nezhoda, northwest of Yelnya, now facing the right flank of the 137th Infantry Division of IX Army Corps. 24th Army had over 103,000 personnel on strength, greatly outnumbering the 40,000 of XX Corps and the 137th, but had only 35 tanks. Rakutin's first shock group was made up of the 107th, the 102nd Tanks, and the 100th Division. Mironov's mission was to:

... attack southward in the 2-kilometre-wide sector from the northern outskirts of Sadki to Hill 237.8 and the northern outskirts of Gur'evo [9-11km northwest of Yelnya] to capture Nezhoda Station and the woods north of Voloskovo Farm by day's end.

Rakutin also ordered the newly arrived 309th Rifle Division to be prepared to back up the shock group.

The offensive started promptly at 0700 hours in heavy fog, after a well-planned artillery preparation using some 640 guns, mortars, and Katyushas. A holding attack against the nose of the salient was made by the 19th and 309th Divisions, and supporting attacks were made by the 120th and 303rd Rifle Divisions. The initial attack by the 107th and 102nd struck the 137th Infantry from the Ustrom River north of a divisional strongpoint at Bataevo, eastward to a point north of Sadki, and thence to the west bank of the Uzha River at Gurevo. The 102nd was stalled on the slopes of Hill 247.6, but the 107th advanced from north of Sadki to Gurevo with the 586th Rifle Regiment, led by Col. Ivan Mikhailovich Nekrasov on the left and the 765th Regiment, under command of Lt. Col. Matvei Stepanovich Batrakov, on the right. The 630th Regiment was in second echelon. The 765th broke through the forward German defenses and reached Sadki by noon. Following six hours of intense combat, in which it changed hands several times, the village was taken. The 586th advanced about 1,000m and took Hill 238.7 at 1500 hours, but was then halted by heavy fire, as was the 630th on the approaches to Dashino Farm. The 100th Division faltered against heavy defenses at Mitino after gaining just 500m. Over the day Mironov lost 40 killed and 75 wounded, which included four battalion commanders and several battalion commissars. Rakutin complained subsequently that "The 102nd TD and 107th RD attacked worst of all, and, despite their high density of weapons, they almost failed to advance at all. This is explained, first and foremost, by disorganization in the division's command, for which the commanders and commissars... received severe reprimands and warnings from me."

At 0230 hours on August 31 Rakutin and Zhukov issued orders for the attack to resume at 0700 with the same objectives, following a 10-minute fire raid. Zhukov had been angered by the ineffectiveness of the bombardment the previous morning. He also formed a special group to be commanded by Col. I. M. Ivanov, a staff officer of 24th Army. This was intended to infiltrate the German lines to disrupt their rear areas:

For operations against communications in the enemy's rear, form a composite detachment consisting of a tank group, and assault company, a motorized battalion, and an artillery group of 10 guns at the expense of 102nd, 107th, and 100th Divisions. The formation region of the detachment - the woods south of Monina. The detachment must be ready by day's end on 31 August 1941. Name the detachment "Ivanov's Detachment."

Zhukov ordered the tanks and the motorized battalion to advance from Sadki and Bolshaya Nezhoda, pass through the forward defenses of the 137th Infantry, penetrate to an area 10-13km west of Yelnya, cut the road from Yelnya to Boltutino, and form an all-round defense to block German movement in and out of the salient. Rakutin was told to commit the Detachment only once the three divisions had reached the line Bezzaboty–Bolshaya Nezhoda–Demshchino, and his chief of artillery was to support its raid via radio.

Meanwhile, the shock group continued its costly advance. During August 31 the 630th Regiment made a surprise attack before dawn without artillery, took the south slopes of Hill 248.3 plus two groves between 1 and 1.5km south and southwest of Sadki by 1700 hours, after which it reached within 1km of the Smolensk–Yelnya railroad by 2300. It had lost some of its gains to a counterattack in the afternoon, but still ended the day with 13 prisoners, four captured tanks (one operable) and four trucks, several motorcycles, two mortars, two machine guns, plus "many" rifles, grenades, ammunition, and documents. The 102nd and 100th did less well, but the 303rd to the south managed a 2km gain similar to the 107th's, increasing German fears of the salient being cut off. Materna had used one regiment of the 263rd Infantry Division to reinforce the struggling 137th. Zhukov, on the other hand, raged at the commander of the 100th to get his division moving to the support of the 107th.

Overnight, Rakutin regrouped his divisions, including returning 250 men from Ivanov's Detachment to the 102nd Tanks. He reported the 107th's action of September 1 as follows:

107th RD - attacked at dawn, with 586th RR spearheading the advance with the mission to clear German forces from the vicinity of Nezhoda Station "at all cost."
- 586th RR - captured the German strongpoint at Voloskovo Farm, 3 kilometres east of Bol'shaia Nezhoda, by enveloping it with two battalions (400 men) shortly after dawn, but was encircled and cut off by a strong German counterattack during the afternoon.
- 630th and 765th RRs - assaulted Bol'shaia Nezhoda and Nezhoda Station but halted by strong enemy resistance. The army commander ordered 102nd TD and 100th RD to support 107th RD's advance.

After dusk the 309th Division was ordered to replace the very weak 102nd and join the 107th's attack toward the Station. Materna sent another regiment of the 263rd Infantry to reinforce the Sadki area.

As the 309th moved up, Ivanov's Detachment was ordered to move south from its assembly area to a jumping-off position in the woods to the rear of the 107th by 0600 hours on September 2. An hour later the northern shock group pushed off against heavy resistance. Mironov attempted to rescue the 586th Regiment with the 765th, but this was stymied by a counterattack. The 630th took Mitino from the southwest, but immediately met the same counterattack, which overran the headquarters of Maj. A. P. Mette. In this action he was severely wounded along with his chief of staff; two of his battalion commanders were also put out of action, and Mitino was lost. By dusk the entire division was under threat of encirclement. The 100th Division attacked west of Mitino to protect the 107th's left wing and this time made some progress, while the 309th continued to move into its assembly areas. Early in the morning Ivanov's Detachment had passed its reconnaissance units through the lines of the 263rd Infantry, bypassing Bolshaya Nezhoda and Sofievka and taking up positions just north of the Yelnya–Roslavl road.

By now a heated debate was underway in the German High Command on the question of abandoning the salient. By the end of September 2 the commander of Army Group Center, Field Marshal F. von Bock, decided to pull out of Yelnya due to high losses and his lack of reserves elsewhere. This had no immediate effect on the battle, but 24th Army made greater progress on September 3. First, Zhukov ordered the commitment of the remainder of Ivanov's Detachment into the rear of the 263rd. The shock group itself went over to the attack again at 0700 hours against still strong resistance from the 263rd and the 78th Infantry Division. The 586th Regiment remained encircled near Voloskovo Farm, now running short of ammunition and food. Rakutin ordered Ivanov to link up with the regiment, which was successful, but Ivanov was mortally wounded, and his Detachment took 25 percent losses with seven of its 20 tanks knocked out. Meanwhile, the 765th and the disorganized 630th fought all day, finally cutting the railroad west of Nezhoda Station and Sofievka to the south. The southern shock group also advanced 2-3km during the day after having been balked by counterattacks for two days.

==== German withdrawal ====
Materna began a phased withdrawal overnight on September 3/4. Zhukov, probably anticipating this move, directed the two shock groups to exploit toward a linkup to prevent a significant number of German troops escaping the trap. The northern group was reinforced with the 395th Rifle Regiment of the 127th Rifle Division. The withdrawal proceeded in an orderly manner on September 4 as the encirclement was never completed. Zhukov observed the activity from Mironov's headquarters and urged him forward, but as 24th Army reported that evening, the division "led its attacks with 765th RR and the remnants of 596th and 630th RRs, but [was] unable to advance southward from the Bol'shaia Nezhoda, Nezhoda Station, and Voloskovo Farm region." Although later Soviet accounts stated the two shock groups were just "hundreds of metres" apart, the gap was in fact some 8km wide. The right wing of the 137th Infantry and the two regiments of the 263rd continued to block the northern group until the withdrawal was largely complete on September 5, after which they were pulled back into reserve for rest and refitting.

In Zhukov's summary to Stalin on September 8 he stated, "As far as our forces were concerned, 107th and 19th Rifle Divisions operated very well. The 100th and 120th Rifle Divisions operated quite well. The 303rd and 309th Rifle Divisions operated poorly and without initiative." Despite this assessment, the 100th would become the 1st Guards Rifle Division and the 127th the 2nd Guards on September 18. On the same day what remained of the division was loaded on trains at Spas-Demensk and Pavlinovo and moved to the area of Vyshny Volochyok to come under the Reserve of the Supreme High Command for rebuilding. On September 26 it was redesignated as the 5th Guards Rifle Division. Mironov was promoted to major general on January 10, 1942, and remained in command until April 20 when he was given command of the 7th Guards Rifle Corps. He was leading the 37th Guards Rifle Corps on April 28, 1945, with the rank of lieutenant general, when he was made a Hero of the Soviet Union. His former regimental commanders, Batrakov and Nekrasov, had both been made Heroes on September 11, 1941, for their leadership at Yelnya.

== 2nd Formation ==
A new 107th was formed on April 17, 1942, at Tambov in the Moscow Military District, based on the 11th Rifle Brigade. Col. Dmitrii Feoktisovich Dremin, who had led the 11th since the previous November, was appointed to command on the day it began forming. Once completed its order of battle was completely different from that of the 1st formation:

- 507th Rifle Regiment
- 516th Rifle Regiment
- 522nd Rifle Regiment
- 1032nd Artillery Regiment
- 409th Antitank Battalion
- 463rd Antiaircraft Battery (until May 20, 1943)
- 490th Machine Gun Battalion (from October 10, 1942 until May 10, 1943)
- 166th Reconnaissance Company
- 327th Sapper Battalion
- 677th Signal Battalion (later 645th Signal Company)
- 247th Medical/Sanitation Battalion
- 147th Chemical Defense (Anti-gas) Platoon
- 531st Motor Transport Company
- 375th Field Bakery
- 846th Divisional Veterinary Hospital
- 1623rd Field Postal Station (later 916th, 28937th)
- 973rd Field Office of the State Bank (later 1614th)

By the beginning of June the division had been assigned to the 3rd Reserve Army in the Reserve of the Supreme High Command. On July 9 the 107th joined the active army when 3rd Reserve was redesignated as 60th Army. This Army soon joined Voronezh Front in the vicinity of the city of that name. At this time the STAVKA was still uncertain of German strategic plans and suspected a new effort to capture Moscow from the south.

=== Battles on the Don ===
60th Army was tasked with guarding the road to Voronezh from the advance of the German 2nd Army's VII Army Corps. By July 15, the Army had been driven out of the city and the 107th was deployed along the Don River to the northwest. On July 22, the Army launched heavy assaults against the defenses northwest of Voronezh. Catching VII Corps in the middle of a divisional relief, the 161st Rifle Division was able to push to the Don River 10km northwest of the city, while the 107th, with part of the 25th Tank Corps, was able to cut the main German supply route to the west. However, the assault soon faltered under withering antitank and artillery fire, which forced the attackers back from the road. Farther east, the remainder of 25th Tanks, together with the 303rd and 195th Rifle Divisions, plus the battalions of 18th Tank Corps, fought their way into Voronezh's northern suburbs, and the Army's 121st Rifle Division, supported by 17th Tank Corps, struck the defenses on the east side of the city.

The city's suburbs saw intense fighting for several days more. However, despite their best efforts, the attacking Soviet forces were unable to sustain the offensive. Although they were able to retain a small wedge in German defenses east of the Don at Semiluki, heavy air strikes and counterattacks repulsed or halted any subsequent attacks. Over the following months the 107th was engaged in steady, small-scale attritional fighting along the Don. In November it was transferred to 40th Army of the same Front, and on November 29 Colonel Dremin was briefly placed at disposal of the Front's military council, before being moved to command of the 309th Rifle Division. He would be promoted to the rank of major general on September 15, 1943, made a Hero of the Soviet Union on October 23, and would hold several more divisional and deputy corps commands. He was replaced by Col. Pyotr Maksimovich Bezhko, who had previously led the 3rd Guards Motorized Rifle Regiment before attending the Military Academy of the General Staff. Bezhko would be promoted to major general on February 4, 1943.

== Ostrogozhsk–Rossosh Offensive ==
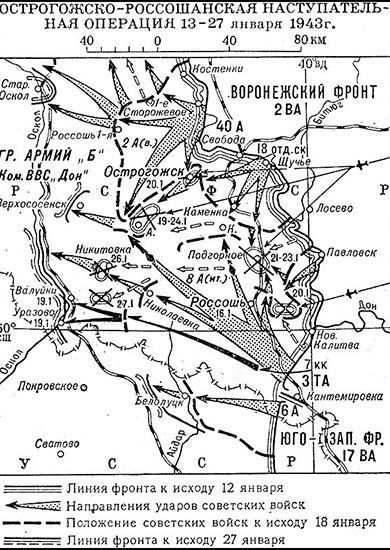
Ostrogozhsk–Rossosh Offensive, January 13-27, 1943

In the planning for this offensive Voronezh Front chose to launch three attacks against those parts of Hungarian 2nd Army and Italian 8th Army that made up the Ostrogozhsk–Rossosh grouping. 40th Army, now under command of Maj. Gen. K. S. Moskalenko, would form the northern group with five rifle divisions, a rifle brigade, a tank corps, and other reinforcements. The main force would attack from the bridgehead at Storozhevoe toward Boldyrevka, Krasnoe, and Alekseevka, linking up with forces of the Front's southern group and completing the encirclement. The Army's breakthrough sector was 10km wide from Height 187 to Devitsa and the first echelon consisted of the 107th, 141st, (less one regiment), 25th Guards, and 340th Rifle Divisions, supported by three tank brigades. The third regiment of the 141st would cover a 47km sector from Kremenchug to Anoshkino, while the Army's screening detachment plus the training battalions of the 107th and 25th Guards would cover the 28km from Donishche to Podlesnyi. The 107th had the 86th Tank Brigade in direct support for the attack. Moskalenko intended that the two units would advance toward Kalinin and Ostrogozhsk, linking up there on the third or fourth day with the right flank of 18th Rifle Corps and the 12th Tank Corps of 3rd Tank Army.

In the afternoon of January 12 the divisions of Moskalenko's first echelon, following an artillery preparation of some one hour and backed by air attacks, sent in forward battalions to probe the Axis positions. Two battalions of the 107th were tasked with seizing the center and northwestern area of the village of Uryvo-Pokrovskoe, a wood 500m to the west, and the village of Goldaevka. Uryvo-Pokrovskoe was defended by one battalion of the 4th Hungarian Infantry Regiment while the wood was held by another battalion of the same regiment and Goldaevka was held by a battalion of the 35th Regiment. Overnight on January 11/12 the 327th Sapper Battalion had laid a large quantity of explosives under the barbed wire entanglements the 107th faced; this was successful in clearing a bath for the rifle battalions. These quickly covered the distance to the forward Hungarian trench and began fighting for Goldaevka and on the south slopes of Height 160. The positions were taken by dusk along with more than 300 prisoners. Following these advances further units of both the 107th and 25th Guards were fed into the battle. The defensive system had been disrupted by a penetration of 3-3.5km on a 6km front. Moskalenko correctly decided to take advantage of the successes of the two divisions by launching his main attack the next day instead of January 14 as originally planned. Overnight the first echelon moved up to its jumping-off positions. A powerful artillery bombardment began at dawn, targeting positions that had been uncovered by the forward battalions. 40th Army had 1,081 guns and mortars along the 10km-wide breakthrough sector.

In the first hours significant progress was made in the center and along the left flank of Moskalenko's shock group. Uryvo-Pokrovskoe was cleared by the 340th Division and its supporting 150th Tank Brigade engaged the reinforcing German 700th Panzer Detachment of some 100 vehicles. Several counterattacks were beaten off with losses and the 340th captured Boldyrevka after an advance of 7km, cutting the Ostrogozhsk–Voronezh road. Meanwhile, according to plan, the 107th widened the breach toward the left flank. The strongpoint at Devitsa was simultaneously outflanked and attacked from the front and the Hungarian grouping was forced back to Kalinin and Peskovatka with the 86th Tanks in pursuit. About 200 prisoners were taken. However, Bezhko's men only advanced 4km through the day, failing to complete the breakthrough of the main defensive zone. All Axis reserves had now been committed.

Moskalenko's next objective was to prevent the occupation of the second defensive zone, and he committed his second echelon to the fighting. The 305th Rifle Division was inserted between the 107th and 340th. In the morning of January 14 the 107th continued to widen the breakthrough to the south and prepare to destroy the Axis grouping near Korotoyak and Ostrogozhsk. By the end of the day it had pushed back the remnants of the 7th Hungarian Infantry Division as far as the Potudan River while its right flank, alongside the 305th, arrived at the second defensive zone near Prilepy. It had gained 5-10km against opposition. The new priority was to complete the encirclement. On January 15 the German command began moving forces of its 2nd Army defending closer to Voronezh to prevent 40th Army from getting into its rear. On the axis to the southern drive Moskalenko committed the 340th between the 107th and 305th to attack toward Lesnoe-Ukolovo. The 107th ran into resistance from the 13th Hungarian Infantry Division along the Potudan leading to a see-saw battle that prevented it reaching and taking Ostrogozhsk, its objective for the day, covering only 2-6km. By now the Army's divisions were attacking on fronts that averaged 17km wide.

During January 16 the 107th rolled up the positions of the 13th Hungarian and advanced 12km, reaching to within 1km of Korotoyak and 2km of Ostrogozhsk. The division reached the latter place the next day and joined hands with the 309th Division and 129th Rifle Brigade of 18th Rifle Corps, after which it attempted to take it from the march with two regiments, but failed. The third regiment seized Korotoyak. In the morning of January 18 it blockaded the garrison of Ostrogozhsk in cooperation with the 340th. This garrison consisted of part of the German 168th Infantry Division with remnants of Hungarian 13th and 10th Infantry Divisions. While these continued to resist, the only exit from the town remaining was covered by Soviet firepower.

=== Battle for Ostrogozhsk ===
From January 19 to January 27 Voronezh Front set about eliminating the encircled Axis Rossosh grouping. The 107th and the 129th Rifle Brigade were given substantial reinforcements in artillery in order to eliminate the Ostrogozhsk garrison, altogether about four German/Hungarian regiments. The guns were from the 10th Breakthrough Artillery Division, and consisted of two cannon artillery regiments, two howitzer regiments, two antitank regiments, and two high-power artillery battalions. These augmented the 1032nd Artillery Regiment and the artillery regiment of the 340th, which had been left behind with one rifle battalion. Altogether there were 257 guns and 176 mortars, of which 82 guns would employ direct fire. On the first day the 107th struck the town from the northwest and captured a grove of trees on its northern outskirts. By dusk it had cleared Novaya Sotnya and two regiments were fighting in the western outskirts. The garrison made an attempt to break out to the west, but this was halted by the single battalion of the 340th alongside the 107th. On the morning of January 20 bitter fighting began in the heart of the town and by 1500 hours it had been completely cleared by the 107th and 129th Brigade. A large part of the garrison was either captured or killed. In addition to prisoners vast stores or ammunition and equipment were taken. Several small groups managed to break out toward the southwest, reaching the woods northeast of Alekseevka, linking up with Axis forces there. This was largely due to inactivity by the 309th Division.

== Voronezh–Kastornoye Offensive ==
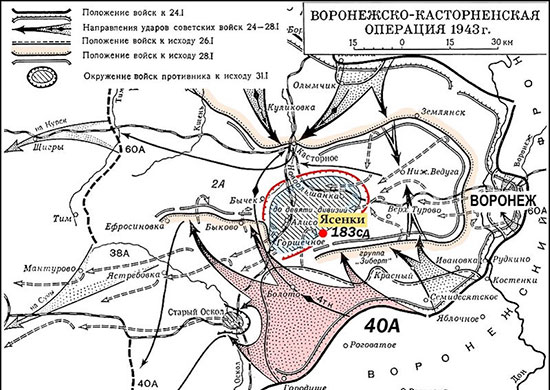
Voronezh–Kastornoye Offensive

The STAVKA released its plan for the new offensive on January 20. Voronezh Front would commit its 40th, 60th, and 38th Armies, while Bryansk Front's 13th Army would attack from the north in order to encircle and destroy German 2nd and what remained of Hungarian 2nd Armies. The shock groups of both 40th and 60th Armies were to attack from the jumping-off line held by 40th Army's right wing. Moskalenko chose to attack on a wide frontage of 50km, from Semidesyatskoye to 2nd Gorodishche, with the objectives of Dmitrievka, Gorshechnoye, and Kastornoye. He deployed his infantry forces in two echelons, with the 107th as one of the five divisions and one rifle brigade in the first. On the first day, January 24, the attackers were to advance 20–25km, followed by 10–15km the next day, and on January 27 the division and the 25th Guards, 309th, 107th, and 340th were to reach the line Lachinovo–Nizhnyaya Graivoronka–Platonovka–Aleksandrovka. At this point it was to link up with units of 13th Army and complete the encirclement. The Axis defense was based on a chain of village strongpoints with heavy minefields, while the gaps were swept by firepower. It quickly became apparent that Moskalenko was lacking in artillery to suppress these strongpoints.

40th Army was to carry the main weight of the Front's attack. The attack frontages of its first echelon divisions were between 6–12km; the 107th was deployed across 8km in the Army's center, with 4th Tank Corps along side it and the 309th. The assault was to be preceded by a 30-minute artillery preparation, plus a total of 200 45mm antitank guns and 76mm regimental guns firing over open sights. However, after the exertions of the previous offensive, all the Soviet forces were experiencing shortages of ammunition. In an effort to confuse the defenders the offensive began in staggered fashion, with 40th Army attacking first, 60th Army the following day, and the 13th and 38th Armies kicking off on January 26. The 107th, moving up from Ostrogozhsk, arrived in its jumping-off positions just at dawn leaving no time for proper preparations. 40th Army launched its assault in strong blizzard conditions. The artillery preparation was delayed in the hope that visibility would improve, but finally went ahead at 1230 hours. Under the circumstances the Axis losses were insignificant, and no air support was available. The following infantry assault made little progress, although 4th Tanks did better, effectively crushing the 68th Infantry Division and gaining 6–8km. At dusk the 107th managed to take Staro-Nikolaevskaya.

In light of the day's lack of success the Front commander, Col. Gen. N. F. Vatutin, gave Moskalenko a dressing-down over organization, command, and control. Overnight, German 2nd Army evacuated Voronezh. Once this became clear Vatutin ordered 40th Army to push forward across its entire front, with the rifle formations to reach a line from Gorshechnoye to Stary Oskol in order to encircle the retreating forces. 4th Tanks led the advance by making a surprise advance on the former place via the village of Boloto, clearing it during the afternoon. In its wake the rifle divisions gained 6-18km, with the 107th and 340th capturing a line from Arkhangelskoe to Soldatskoe. Air reconnaissance showed heavy traffic on the roads and railroads leading to Kastornoye; orders for a general withdrawal had already been issued.

=== Advance to the Oskil ===
13th Army entered the battle from the north on January 26. Moskalenko's orders directed his right flank forces to redirect their axes of attack to the north. 4th Tanks was stranded at Gorshechnoye for lack of fuel. Meanwhile, the remainder of 40th Army was also struggling to complete its mission. The 107th reached the line Bocharovka–Kotovo–Ozerki after a further advance of some 10km. Small groups of Germans and Hungarians were retreating toward Stary Oskol. By nightfall the corridor available for the Axis troops to escape encirclement was about 60km wide. On January 27, the 4th Tank Corps attacked at dawn in the direction of Kastornoye, having received fuel by air the previous day. By the end of the day its forward detachment captured Kastornaya Novaya station, cutting the Axis lines of retreat to the southwest. The 107th and 340th, now working with 6th Ski Brigade (not actually ski-trained), pushed ahead to Kaplino–Neznamovo–Ignatovka in an effort to encircle Stary Oskol, which was defended by elements of the German 26th Infantry Division.

Kastornoye was taken in the afternoon of January 28 in a joint operation by 4th Tanks, 13th, and 38th Armies, although mopping up continued overnight. During the day the 107th, 340th, and 6th Ski continued battling in the Stary Oskol area. By now the main escape routes of the Axis Voronezh grouping had been cut, but a continuous line of encirclement had not been formed. As one example, a 25km-wide gap existed between the 25th Guards and the 183rd Divisions; a similar gap existed between Gorshechnoe and Stary Oskol. As a result, no plans could be make to break up the encircled grouping. At this time there were up to eight German and two Hungarian divisions operating southeast of Kastornoye. While loosely encircled, it would require considerable time and effort to defeat them. On January 30 the STAVKA decided to leave this task mostly to 38th Army while the remainder of Voronezh Front's forces began to advance on Kharkiv and Kursk. By now advance elements of the SS Panzer Corps were arriving from France and moving up to the Oskil River to defend Kharkiv. Moskalenko was ordered to be ready to attack through Belgorod toward Kharkiv by February 1. Vatutin was underestimating the capabilities and strength of the encircled grouping and was assigning unrealistic objectives to most of his Front.

Before Moskalenko could carry out his orders he would have to take Stary Oskol. Overnight on January 31/February 1 the remnants of the 88th Infantry Division managed to escape the pocket and began moving on the town. Meanwhile, the 107th, 340th, and 6th Ski continued their unsuccessful battle with 26th Infantry, which was entering its fourth day. On the morning of February 2 the 340th, minus one reinforced battalion, moved southwest to Melovoe against the escaping German/Hungarian forces, leaving the battalion, the 107th, and 6th Ski at Stary Oskol. One retreating group left a strong rearguard in the town as it pulled back along the road to Manturovo; by the end of February 4 its main body reached the Krasnyi Khutor area.

=== Operation Star ===
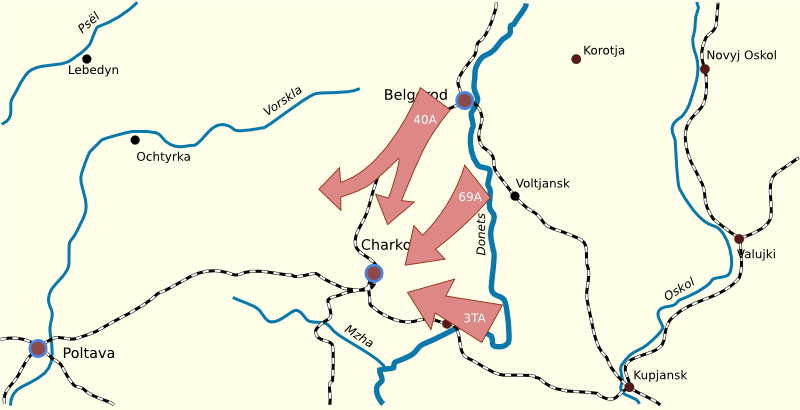
Operation Star

The 107th continued fighting with other withdrawing groups on February 4/5, and by the end of the second day had finally cleared Stary Oskol with the help of a regiment of the 303rd Division. Overnight on February 5/6 the two divisions, on Moskalenko's orders, began moving southwest to link up with the Army's main body attacking toward Belgorod. By the end of February 8 the 60th Army took Kursk, while 40th Army reached Belgorod, clearing it the next day.

On February 19 Army Group South, under command of Field Marshal E. von Manstein, launched a counterattack against Southwestern Front, which was overextended after an advance almost to the Dniepr River, and drove it back to the Northern Donets River with heavy losses. After regrouping, Manstein's forces struck Voronezh Front, retaking Kharkiv on March 16 and Belgorod two days later before halting. 3rd Tank Army had been encircled and destroyed; 40th and 69th Armies nearly suffered the same fate. The spring rasputitsa brought operations to a halt as both sides prepared for offensives in the summer. During March the 107th was transferred to the Front's 69th Army, which was commanded by Lt. Gen. V. D. Kryuchyonkin.

== Battle of Kursk ==
Battle of Kursk. Note position of 69th Army.

During this lull in the fighting the division was substantially rebuilt. On July 5 the 107th would report a strength of 7,920 personnel, armed with 3,876 rifles and carbines, 1,211 PPSh-41 submachine guns, 71 machine guns of all types, 75 artillery pieces of all calibres, 158 mortars of all calibres, and 158 antitank rifles. Just before this the division was grouped into the 48th Rifle Corps with the 305th and 183rd Divisions. 69th Army constituted the Front reserve and so was in second echelon on a sector from Olkhovatka to Yefremovka, with its headquarters at Korocha. Even in rear echelon, where it was intended to backstop the boundary between 6th and 7th Guards Armies, Kryuchyonkin had directed his troops to construct extensive fortifications. This included four antitank strongpoints in the 107th's sector alone, each containing six to twelve antitank guns with wide fields of fire, plus roughly the same number of antitank riflemen and a platoon of submachine gunners.

The German offensive against the Kursk salient began on July 5. 4th Panzer Army made some progress against 6th Guards Army in its initial attack and at 1940 hours Vatutin, now an army general, ordered the 93rd Guards Rifle Division to move to the Prokhorovka area behind the 183rd, further backstopping the boundary. During July 6 the 51st Guards Rifle Division was savaged by the II SS Panzer Corps, losing over half its strength by the following day. 2nd SS Panzer Division Das Reich had penetrated the forward defenses and was moving in the direction of Prokhorovka.

In the first days of the offensive the 107th had been withdrawn from the defensive line Alekseevka–Liptsy to the line Verkhny Olshanets–Gremyache. Therefore, by the morning of July 9 Kryuchyonkin had created two defensive lines on the route to Korocha on or near the paved road from Belgorod to Korocha, in accordance with Vatutin's orders:

1. To place responsibility for the defense of the Korocha axis on the commander of the 69th Army... The task of 69th Army - firmly to defend the front occupied by its forces, Vasil'evka - Belenikhino - Visloe - Shopino - Chernaia Poliana - Staryi Gorod - Blizhniaia Igumenka - Miasoedovo, to prevent an enemy breakthrough of the indicated front from the direction of Melikhovo and his further advance. Destroy the enemy in the region of Melikhovo. Pay particular attention to blocking the Prokhorovka axis and to securing your left flank.

To carry out this mission Kryuchyonkin was reinforced with units of 6th and 7th Guards Armies.

=== Battle for Prokhorovka ===
By the morning of July 10 a combination of units from 6th Guards and 69th Armies were facing the three divisions of II SS Corps. The Psel River formed the boundary between the two Armies. The positions of the 183rd Division and the 11th Motorized Rifle Brigade lay in front of Das Reich and the 1st SS Panzer Division Leibstandarte on a sector from Vasilevka to the Molozhavaia gully to Komsomolets State Farm to Ivanovskii Vyselok to Storozhevoe. The 183rd was backed by the remaining dug-in tanks of 2nd Tank Corps. The Corps had 116 tanks, a combination of T-34s, T-70s, and Churchills. The 107th held a second echelon position from Verkhny Olshanets to Gremyache to a machine tractor station.

Army Group South attacked toward Prokhorovka from two directions on July 11. II SS Corps drove from the west while III Panzer Corps continued an advance from the south begun on July 5. At 0830 hours the right flank units of the 183rd Division and 2nd Tank Corps came under attack from a group of 50 tanks, with 200 aircraft in support. In a series of up to nine attacks before dusk the 183rd was badly battered and forced to pull back in places. Late in the day the III Panzer Corps had penetrated the boundary between 48th Corps and the 35th Guards Rifle Corps, which was also part of 69th Army. At dawn on July 12 the 6th Panzer Division captured the villages of Rzhavets, Vypolzovka and Ryndinka, threatening 48th Corps with partial encirclement. Meanwhile, after a long approach march, the leading brigades of 5th Guards Tank Army's 18th and 29th Tank Corps were closing on the positions of II SS Corps just south of Prokhorovka.

Overnight on July 11/12 Kryuchyonkin had regrouped his forces in order to deal with III Panzer. This had left the 107th on a line from outside Veselyi gully to Shukhovtsevo to Gremyache to outside Ploskoe. This shuffle also put the 107th under command of 35th Guards Corps. On the morning of July 14 he wrote:

In the course of fighting on 13.07, it was revealed that the enemy had formed two groupings:
1. A Southern Group - consisting of the 168th Infantry Division, the 6th Panzer Division, and elements of the 19th Panzer Division - for a strike toward Shakhovo from the areas of Rzhavets and Ryndinka.
2. A Northern Group - consisting of the Panzergrenadier Division Das Reich, the Panzergrenadier Division Adolf Hitler, and the 167th Infantry Division - for an attack from the areas of Teterevino, Iasnaia Poliana, and Hill 258.2, also in the direction of Shakhovo.
The task of these groupings is to encircle the forces of the 48th Rifle Corps south and southwest of Shakhovo, and to exploit in general direction to the north.

Having accurately assessed the German plan Kryuchyonkin issued orders to his corps. A reinforced 48th Corps was to attack and destroy the German forces in and around Rzhavets in cooperation with the 35th Guards Corps. This Corps was also augmented, with the 107th specifically receiving the 130th Separate Antitank Rifle Battalion.

=== Operation Roland ===
After nine days of continuous combat and now under threat of encirclement individuals and even small groups of the two Corps began deserting their posts. SMERSH set up blocking detachments to the rear and between July 12-17 350 men of the 107th were detained after leaving the battlefield or emerging from encirclement; all but a handful were returned to their units. 69th Army's situation deteriorated on July 14 when II SS Corps broke the defenses near Belenikhino and Vinogradovka with the goal of completing the encirclement of 48th Corps. The German "Southern Group" also attacked at dawn and by 0815 hours had scored a breakthrough with up to 50 tanks, including 10 Tigers, and a battalion of infantry. At 1300 Kryuchyonkin's headquarters reported:

... 3. The 35th Guards Rifle Corps: units of the corps in cooperation with Major General Trufanov's mobile group continue to repulse enemy tank and infantry attacks in the direction of Krasnoe Znamia, Avdeevka, Aleksandrovka and Novo-Khmelevoe.
After regrouping, the enemy with a force of up to a regiment of infantry and the support of up to 150 tanks resumed the offensive in the direction of Krasnoe Znamia, Avdeevka, Aleksandrovka and Novo-Khmelevoe. At 1200, the infantry and tank attack was repulsed. Up to 40 enemy tanks were knocked out.

By the morning of July 15 it was clear that the only possible course was to withdraw the 48th Corps from the pocket as quickly as possible.

This was carried out overnight on July 14/15 beginning at 0140 hours. The remainder of 69th Army supported the withdrawal where and when it could. 35th Guards Corps made diversionary attacks against the right flank of III Panzer Corps early in the morning. the 107th and 94th Guards Rifle Divisions, "with the aim of diverting [enemy] forces from the main axis and creating panic in the enemy's rear" made attacks in battalion strength on Raevka, Verkhny Olshanets, and Shliakhovoe. "The battalion of the 107th Rifle Division, approaching Raevka, was detected by the enemy and came under concentrated artillery and mortar fire, after which it was compelled to fall back to its starting position." By 1040 the withdrawal of five rifle divisions in various states of repair was complete. By this time the Soviet counteroffensive against the Oryol salient north of Kursk had been underway for three days and Army Group South was forced to the defensive. By the beginning of August the 69th Army had been moved to Steppe Front and the 107th was still in 35th Guards Corps.

== Into Eastern Ukraine ==
In preparation for the counteroffensive into Ukraine, Operation Polkovodets Rumyantsev, the commander of Steppe Front, Col. Gen. I. S. Konev, formed a shock group consisting of the 53rd Army and the 48th Corps to attack on August 3 on a 11km front from Glushinskii to Visloe. 48th Corps was to break through the German defense and develop the offensive in the general direction of Belgorod. 35th Guards Corps, consisting of the 94th and 93rd Guards Rifle Divisions and the 107th, was deployed on a 13km-wide front from outside Kiselovo to the center of Staryi Gorod. In what was essentially a pinning attack the Corps was to force the Severskii Donets River near Khokhlova on the first day in cooperation with the 89th Guards Rifle Division of 48th Corps. The objective was to encircle a German grouping in the Dacha area to the east of Visloe, and then on the second day advance to the Belomestnaya–Petropavlovka area to serve as 69th Army's second echelon.

The counteroffensive started as planned, preceded by a complex artillery preparation from 0500 to 0815 hours. The shock group faced stubborn trench fighting until 1500 when 1st Mechanized Corps was committed and completed the breakthrough of the main German defensive zone. In all the shock group advanced 7–9km by day's end. On August 4 the 69th and 53rd Armies broke through the second and third defensive zones which covered Belgorod from the north. For the next day the 69th was ordered to take Belgorod in cooperation with 7th Guards Army. In accordance the 89th Guards and 305th Rifle Divisions cleared Belgorod by 1800 hours. Shortly after the fall of Kharkiv on August 23 the 107th was moved to 53rd Army where it rejoined 48th Corps. On September 29 it was removed to the Reserve of the Supreme High Command for rebuilding, again joining 69th Army and being assigned to 76th Rifle Corps. By the start of November it was in the 74th Rifle Corps of 1st Guards Army. It remained in the Reserve until November 12, when 1st Guards was assigned to 1st Ukrainian Front (former Voronezh Front). 74th Corps also contained the 183rd and 305th Divisions.

== Into Western Ukraine ==
At this time 1st Ukrainian Front was on the defensive, under attack by the 4th Panzer Army. The 1st Guards was to unload from its trains during November 11–26 at Brovary and Darnitsa stations, along with the 25th Tank Corps, and reinforce the Front as it regrouped. In orders from the STAVKA, "the front's most important and main task is to defeat the enemy's Belaya Tserkov' group of forces and the capture Popel'nya, Belaya Tserkov' and Kagarlyk with the front's left wing, after which you are again to force the offensive along the Kazatin axis." The Front commander, General Vatutin, ordered the arriving elements of the Army to be immediately moved to the west bank of the Dniepr, without waiting to complete concentration, and move to the west and southwest of Kyiv.

=== Kyiv Strategic Defensive Operation ===
The 38th Army was struck on November 15 by the 1st Panzer and Leibstandarte Divisions. The goal was to defeat 1st Ukrainian Front, recapture Kyiv, and eliminate the Red Army's bridgehead over the Dniepr. 1st Guards began arriving in strength on the evening of November 21, and the 74th Corps was ordered to take up defensive positions along a line from Iline Nizhilovichi to Gruzkoye to Sosnovka by 0800 hours on November 22, with its front facing west. Vatutin decided to go over to the counterattack with the 1st Guards' 94th Rifle Corps on November 25, but its 74th and 107th Rifle Corps would remain on the defense. In fact the Army was not ready to attack, in part due to a Front-wide shortage of ammunition, and Vatutin postponed the start by 24 hours. Fighting continued through November 29 but both sides were by now effectively played out. During December the 107th, still in 74th Corps, was reassigned to 38th Army, commanded by General Moskalenko, still in 1st Ukrainian Front.

=== Zhitomir–Berdichev and Proskurov-Chernivtsi Offensives ===
Vatutin's counteroffensive finally began on December 24 but initially only involved the 1st Guards and the 1st Tank Armies. It soon expanded to include the 38th Army, which was facing the German XIII Army Corps north of Zhytomyr. By December 30 the 4th Panzer Army's front was breaking apart and a 58km-wide gap had opened between it and XIII Corps; the following day Zhytomyr was liberated for the second time. On January 4, 1944, that Corps, attempting to hold at and northwest of Berdychiv, reported that it was falling apart, and that city fell a few days later. By the end of the month the lines had stabilized north of Vinnytsia. By this time the 107th had been reassigned to the 17th Guards Rifle Corps, still in 38th Army. During February it came under direct command of the Front.

The offensive was renewed on March 4. The Front's initial objective was Vinnytsia, after which it was to continue to advance southwest toward Zhmerynka, which had been designated as a Festung (fortress) by Hitler. On March 19 the division earned a battle honor:

KREMENETS... 107th Rifle Division (Major General Bezhko, Pyotr Maksimovich)... The troops who participated in the liberation of Kremenets, by the order of the Supreme High Command of 19 March 1944, and a commendation in Moscow, are given a salute of 12 artillery salvoes from 124 guns.

During the month the division was briefly assigned to 13th Army, before returning to 60th Army as part of 28th Rifle Corps; it would remain in this Army for the duration of the war.

== Lvov-Sandomierz Offensive ==
On June 14 General Bezhko was placed at disposal of the Front's military council before being given command of the 276th Rifle Division in July. He would lead this into the postwar when he was hospitalized with tuberculosis. He eventually went into the training establishment and retired in August 1958. He was replaced by Col. Vasilii Yakovlevich Petrenko, who had previously led the 226th Rifle Division; he had been made a Hero of the Soviet Union on October 17, 1943, for his service in the Dniepr crossings. He would remain in command of the division until it was disbanded.

As the outset of the summer offensive the 107th was still in 28th Corps with the 246th Rifle Division. In the planning for a new offensive the 60th Army commander, Col. Gen. P. A. Kurochkin, assigned his 15th and 28th Rifle Corps to the main task of driving westward to Lviv in conjunction with the 3rd Guards Tank Army, while the 23rd Rifle Corps was to attack in the general direction of Sokolovka to encircle and destroy the German forces in the Brody area. The 15th and 28th Corps were concentrated on a 4km-wide sector and were to penetrate the German defense from the grove of trees north of Trostianets to Bzovitsa and develop the attack in the general direction Sokolovka and Lviv. The operation began with reconnaissance actions on July 13, and the shock groups went over to the attack at 1600 hours the next day; the 28th and 15th Corps fought along the line from Perepelniki to Oleiouv. On July 15 the 28th Corps repelled infantry and tank counterattacks while fighting along a line from Na-Zasliaiiakh to Oleiouv. By this time the Army's lead forces had wedged to a depth of 14–16km into the German defenses and the following morning the 3rd Guards Tank was committed into the breach.

By now the German forces, recognizing their deteriorating position, were attempting to both withdraw to the west and to counterattack to restore their lines. The Army's forces advanced almost 12km on July 16 and 28th Corps reached from Ivanuv to Yaroslavitse. During July 17 the Army's right flank and center forces gained another 6–8km. During the following day the 28th Corps continued beating off counterattacks by up to a battalion of infantry and 10-11 tanks at a time and reached the northern outskirts of Volchkovtse to Yaroslavitse. The next day the encirclement of XIII Army Corps near Brody was completed. On July 20 the encircled force attempted to breach the encirclement on a line from Belyi Kamen to Iasonovitse while also trying to penetrate from Sasov to Zolochev with a smaller force. This grouping was able to reach the south bank of the Western Bug River near Belyi Kamen in the early hours of July 20, forcing back elements of the 336th Rifle Division. Kurochkin ordered the 107th, the 8th Antitank Artillery Brigade, and several smaller artillery and rifle units to this region to successfully block any further escape attempts. At about this time the 107th and 336th were regrouped as the 15th Rifle Corps. The division would remain in this Corps almost continuously until after the end of the war.

XIII Corps continued its breakout efforts on July 21, now aiming to the south in the Remizovtse region. Several units were able to penetrate south of Pochapy in small groups, but these were mostly soon isolated and destroyed. 60th Army fought through the day to liquidate the separate German pockets. By 2300 hours the Army's units were frighting from Belyi Kamen through Pochapy and Bortkuv to the northern outskirts of Kondratuv and Voroniaki to the east of Snovich. Uncoordinated breakout efforts continued overnight and into the morning of July 22 but morale was falling due to relentless Soviet tank and infantry attacks, airstrikes, and artillery fire, combined with lack of food and fuel. By the end of the day the surrender of large groups became common and the pocket was largely cleared during the afternoon. 17,000 prisoners were taken, along with a great deal of equipment and supplies. On July 27 the 60th Army launched a decisive attack on the city of Lviv, but this did not directly involve 15th Corps.

== Into Germany and Czechoslovakia ==
During December the 107th had over 6,000 personnel on strength, with 60-70 men in each of the rifle companies, a very respectable number for this stage of the war. As of January 1, 1945, the 15th Corps had the 107th, 336th, and the 9th Plastun (dismounted Cossack) Division. During the Vistula-Oder Offensive 60th Army began a deep exploitation to the west, through southern Poland. On January 19 the 107th took part in the capture of Kraków, and the 504th Rifle Regiment (Colonel Shibalov, Yakov Semyonovich) was awarded its name as an honorific. On February 19 the 522nd Regiment would be awarded the Order of Suvorov, 3rd Degree, for its part in the same victory.

On January 26 the 28th Corps drove off German rearguards on the approaches to the Auschwitz concentration camp. The next morning a mounted reconnaissance unit of the 107th reached the camp itself, which was liberated later in the day by the 322nd Rifle Division.

=== Lower Silesian Offensive ===
This offensive began on February 8, with the goal of capturing Breslau and advancing to the Neisse River. 60th Army occupied a 76km-wide front from Schoenblick to Goczalkowice on the Front's left wing. All three of the Army's rifle corps were deployed in the first echelon; 15th Corps had all three divisions in a single echelon as well. Both 60th and 59th Armies were in a bridgehead over the Oder River north of Ratibor, and faced significant German forces for this period of the war. As a result, the two Armies made only minor gains in the first days of the offensive and soon went over to the defense.

=== Upper Silesian Offensive ===
The Front commander, Marshal Konev, completed the Lower Silesian offensive by February 24, after which he began laying plans for a new offensive into upper Silesia. Upon the arrival of his Front's main group of forces in the Neisse area the 59th and 60th Armies were to develop the attack from the bridgehead north of Ratibor to the west and southwest. Ultimately this operation would encircle and destroy the German group of forces in the Oppeln salient. At this time the personnel strength of the Army's divisions had been reinforced to a strength of from 4,500 to 5,000 men and women. General Kurochkin planned to lead his attack with the 28th Corps on a 4km-wide front, with the 15th Corps to be introduced once a breach was made. 106th Corps was to hold along its present lines. As of March 1 the 107th was under direct Army command.

The offensive on the 59th and 60th Army's sector began at 0850 hours on March 15 following an 80-minute artillery preparation, and went largely according to plan although more slowly than expected. The main German defense zone was broken through on a 12km front and the Armies advanced 6–8km during the day. Bad weather prevented air support before noon, and the advancing forces also had to repel ten counterattacks. In response Konev ordered that the advance continue through the night. During the day on March 16 the 60th Army managed to advance another 4km and the following day, having repelled 13 German counterattacks, overcame the entire tactical depth of the defense in a 13km advance, seized Konigsdorf and advanced right up to Leobschutz. Konev personally visited the 60th Army headquarters on the 17th and demanded that Kurochkin reinforce the left flank of the Army's attacking troops with artillery, the 152nd Tank Brigade and independent self-propelled artillery regiments, as well as second echelon formations to develop the offensive toward Ernau and Biskau. On March 18 the Army encountered a previously prepared line from Hoenplotz to Leobschutz to Ernau and gained only 2–7km. Despite this, by the end of the day a link up with 21st Army was made in the Elgut area. The encircled Oppeln grouping consisted of the 20th SS, 168th and 344th Infantry Divisions, part of the 18th SS Panzergrenadier Division, and several independent regiments and battalions.

==== Battle for Ratibor ====
At about this time the 107th returned to 15th Rifle Corps. During March 19–20 60th Army's forces, while supporting 59th Army's efforts to destroy the Oppeln grouping, prepared to fulfil its earlier mission of defeating the German Ratibor grouping prior to reaching the line of the Opava River. For this purpose it was reinforced with the 5th Guards Mechanized Corps and the 17th Breakthrough Artillery Division. 28th Corps was to launch the main attack in conjunction with units of 5th Guards Mechanized and 31st Tank Corps to capture Leobschutz and Biskau by the end of the first day, while 15th Corps committed only a single right-flank division while the remaining divisions would attack on the second day southward toward Ratibor. The Army faced four German infantry divisions, a panzergrenadier division battle group, nine independent infantry battalions and a tank battalion, for a total of 130 tanks and assault guns.

At 0850 hours on March 22, following an artillery preparation, the Army's right-flank forces began their offensive. The German forces put up stubborn resistance with fire and counterattacks by small groups of infantry and tanks. On the first day the Soviet forces advanced no more than 8km. The next day elements of the 8th and 17th Panzer Divisions were committed, considerably reducing the Soviet advantage in armor. A total of 11 counterattacks were launched, each by up to a battalion of infantry and up to 15 tanks or self-propelled guns. The intensity of these counterstrokes held 15th Corps in check, even with its entire strength committed, and this continued into March 24. By this time the defense had been penetrated to a maximum depth of 15km and Leobschutz had been taken.

Examining the situation, Konev considered that the 60th Army was not capable of carrying out its task alone, and decided to commit the 10th Guards Tank Corps of 4th Guards Tank Army, which was no longer needed in support of 21st Army. The joint offensive began on March 25 but still failed to be decisive, in part because 10th Guards Tanks was considerably understrength, and the German forces held advantageous terrain. Stubborn fighting continued through March 31, with heavy casualties on both sides. Meanwhile, on March 24 the 38th Army of 4th Ukrainian Front began attacking in the direction of Moravian Ostrava, and within days had advanced to a point where the German Ratibor grouping was faced with encirclement. The 106th Rifle Corps entered the attack on March 26 and soon captured Rybnik. In preparation for the storming of Ratibor the Red Air Force launched massed bomber strikes amounting to about 2,000 sorties during March 29–30. In addition, the 25th Breakthrough Artillery Division was moved in to supplement the 17th Division. Early on the morning of March 31 all the artillery in the area opened fire on the German forces, which were defending the outskirts of the town. Following this preparation the 15th and part of 106th Corps began the decisive attack and by 1000 hours Ratibor was cleared. By April 1 the 60th and 4th Guards Tank Armies had reached the line Bleichwitz–Steuberwitz–Berendorf where they halted and consolidated. On April 26 the 107th would be awarded the Order of Suvorov, 2nd Degree, for its part in this victory.

== Prague Offensive ==
In late April the entire 60th Army was transferred to 4th Ukrainian Front for the final campaign against the German forces around Prague. While in the reserve of the 15th Rifle Corps, the 107th received 1,000 replacements and emphasized operations in forested and mountainous terrain during accelerated training. Early on 30 April, the 504th Rifle Regiment was redeployed to the area near Jakubčovice, and took up defenses on the western and southern outskirts of the village while continuing to train.

On the night of 2 to 3 May, the 107th relieved elements of the 336th Rifle Division along a line to the northeast and east of Dittersdorf. At 0830 on 3 May, the 107th attacked with the 516th and 522nd Rifle Regiments with the 504th in the second echelon. The opposing German troops were the 2nd Battalion, Grenadier Field Training Regiment 1318 of the 158th Infantry Division, 85th Ski Engineer Battalion of the 1st Ski Division, and support elements of the 16th Panzer Division. The German command brought up elements of the Grenadier Regiment 484 of the 254th Infantry Division overnight on 2 to 3 May and put up strong fire against the Soviet advance along the line of Hill 512 and the grove to the southwest. At 1600 on 3 May, breaking German resistance, the 107th began a rapid advance and seized Wigstadtl and Oberdorf (Horní Ves), reaching the line of Brzhezi and the highway and rail junction west of Wigstadtl by 3 May.

Beginning on the morning of 4 May, continuing the offensive without meeting significant resistance, the 107th seized Tschirm, Schwansdorf, Bautsch, Gundersdorf-Nieder (Dolní Guntramovice), and Gundersdorf-Ober (Horní Guntramovice) and by the start of 5 May reached the line from the western outskirts of Gundersdorf-Ober to Hill 750. With the aim of cutting off the German retreat from the north and enabling a speedier advance of the 9th Plastun Division, the 107th committed the 504th Rifle Regiment to action early on 5 May. Moving through the elements of the 516th and 522nd Rifle Regiments, the 504th met and overcame German resistance along the line of Altliebe (Stará Libavá), beginning the battle for the outskirts of Beroun by 1000 on 5 May and fully seizing the town in two-and-a-half hours. Meanwhile, the 516th and 522nd Rifle Regiments continued the offensive on the morning of 5 May, with the 522nd seizing Sternberg by 0600 and reaching the southwestern outskirts of the town. German resistance halted the 516th Rifle Regiment along the line of Hill 624 west of Neuhof (Nové Dvorce) and the grove northeast of Lippein and the 516th only reached the northwestern outskirts of Sternberg by 0800 on 6 May. The opposing German troops from Grenadier Regiment 484 and a self-propelled artillery unit, together with disorganized elements, supported by up to 15 armored vehicles, sought to prevent Soviet forces from bypassing Olomouc from the north and put up stiff resistance along the line of Pirnik (Brníčko), Selechowiz (Želechovice), and Gnoitz (Hnojice).

The 516th Rifle Regiment, breaking German resistance, seized Pirnik, Mährisch Neustadt, and Meedl (Medlov), reaching the western outskirts of Meedl by the end of 6 May. The 504th and 522nd Rifle Regiments made insignificant gains in the face of German counterattacks, reaching a line east of Strzelitz (Střelice), east of Einoth (Renoty), and the western outskirts of Žerotín by the end of 6 May. Elements of the division continued fighting on 7 and 8 May and by the end of 8 May advanced slightly to reach the line of the grove west of Königlosen (Králová), Pinke (Benkov), Strzelitz, and Knibitz (Pňovice). On the night of 8 to 9 May the 522nd Rifle Regiment handed over its positions near Knibitz to elements of the 336th Rifle Division and moved to the right near Pinke. Between 3 and 8 May, the division lost 99 killed and 702 wounded while reporting the capture of 656 German troops and the killing of up to 660.

Elements of the division halted combat operations at 0100 on 9 May in line with the conditions for the capitulation of the German troops, ready to resume the advance at 0700 that day if the German troops refused to surrender. Due to the refusal of German troops to surrender, the 107th resumed its advance at 1000 on 9 May, and without meeting resistance from German troops rapidly retreating to the west, moved west from Muglitz through Blosdorf, Litomyšl, Chrast, and Kolín to end its pursuit near Rostoklaty and Vykáň roughly 30 km east of Prague as the war ended on 12 May. The division concentrated to the northeast near Netřebice and Křečkov by 13 May. In their pursuit of retreating German troops in the final days of the war, the 107th reported the capture and transfer to Czechoslovak forces of 2,200 soldiers and officers, 400 horses, 75 artillery guns, 200 aircraft, 25 tanks and armored vehicles, 180 light vehicles, 120 trucks, and 50 motorcycles. The division suffered casualties of one killed and one wounded between 8 and 16 May.

== Postwar ==
On May 28 several subunits of the 107th were decorated for their parts in the capture of Opava on April 22:

- 516th Rifle Regiment - Order of Suvorov, 3rd class
- 1032nd Artillery Regiment - Order of Kutuzov, 3rd class
- 409th Antitank Battalion - Order of Bogdan Khmelnitsky, 3rd class
- 327th Sapper Battalion - Order of the Red Star

After the end of the war, the division engaged in combat and political training between 13 May and 8 June. According to STAVKA Order No. 11097 of May 29, 1945, parts 5 and 8, the 60th Army was to be transferred to the Northern Group of Forces in Poland, and the 107th is listed as one of the rifle divisions to be "disbanded in place". The division began moving on 9 June from Dymokury through northeastern Bohemia and Lower Silesia to concentrate near Klein Wysocko and Gross Wysocko, southeast of Ostrów, by 22 June. It was disbanded in accordance with the directive between 25 June and 3 July 1945, with its troops distributed among elements of the 65th Army.

Colonel Petrenko was promoted to major general on July 11. He would command the 119th Rifle Corps during 1955-57 and was promoted to lieutenant general on April 27, 1962, before his retirement in 1976.
