= Ulinski =

Ulinski (Polish: Uliński; feminine: Ulińska; plural: Ulińscy) is a surname. Notable people with the surname include:

- Ed Ulinski (1919–2006), American football player
- Franz Abdon Ulinski (1890–1974), Austrian engineer
- Harry Ulinski (1925–2008), American football player
