= Netřebice =

Netřebice may refer to places in the Czech Republic:

- Netřebice (Český Krumlov District), a municipality and village in the South Bohemian Region
- Netřebice (Nymburk District), a municipality and village in the Central Bohemian Region
