= Blizhnyaya Igumenka =

Blizhnyaya Igumenka Ближняя Игуменка
- Selo
- Location within Belgorod Oblast Location within Russia
- Coordinates: 50°36′N 36°42′E
- Country: Russia
- Region: Belgorod Oblast
- District: Belgorodsky District
- Time zone: UTC+3:00

Blizhnyaya Igumenka (Russian: Ближняя Игуменка) is a rural locality (a selo) and the administrative center of Belovskoye Rural Settlement, Belgorodsky District, Belgorod Oblast, Russia. The population was 1,063 as of 2010. There are 90 streets.

== Geography ==
Blizhnyaya Igumenka is located 27 km northeast of Maysky (the district's administrative centre) by road. Belovskoye is the nearest rural locality.
