= Lipina (Olomouc District) =

- Municipality
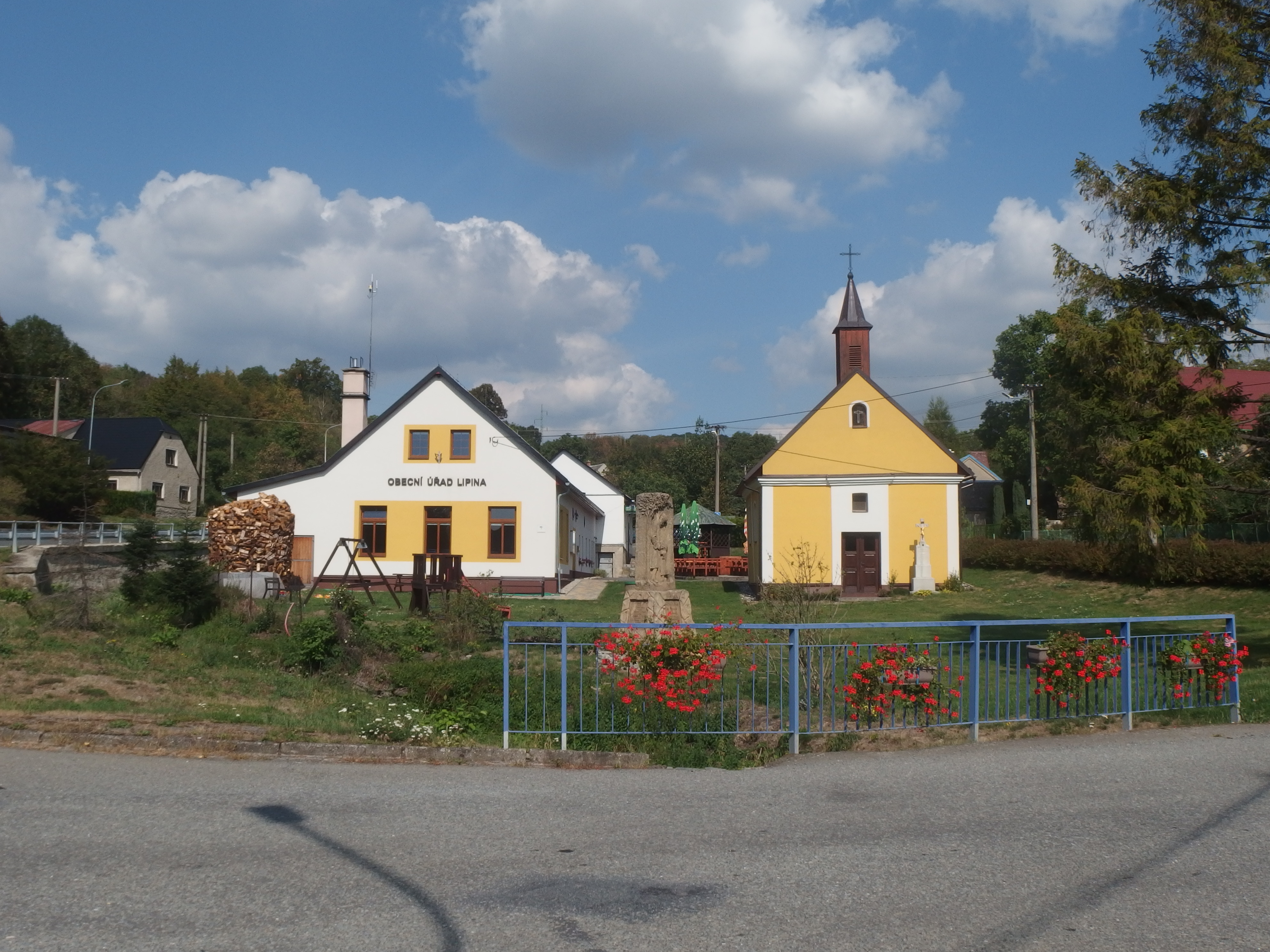
- Centre of Lipina

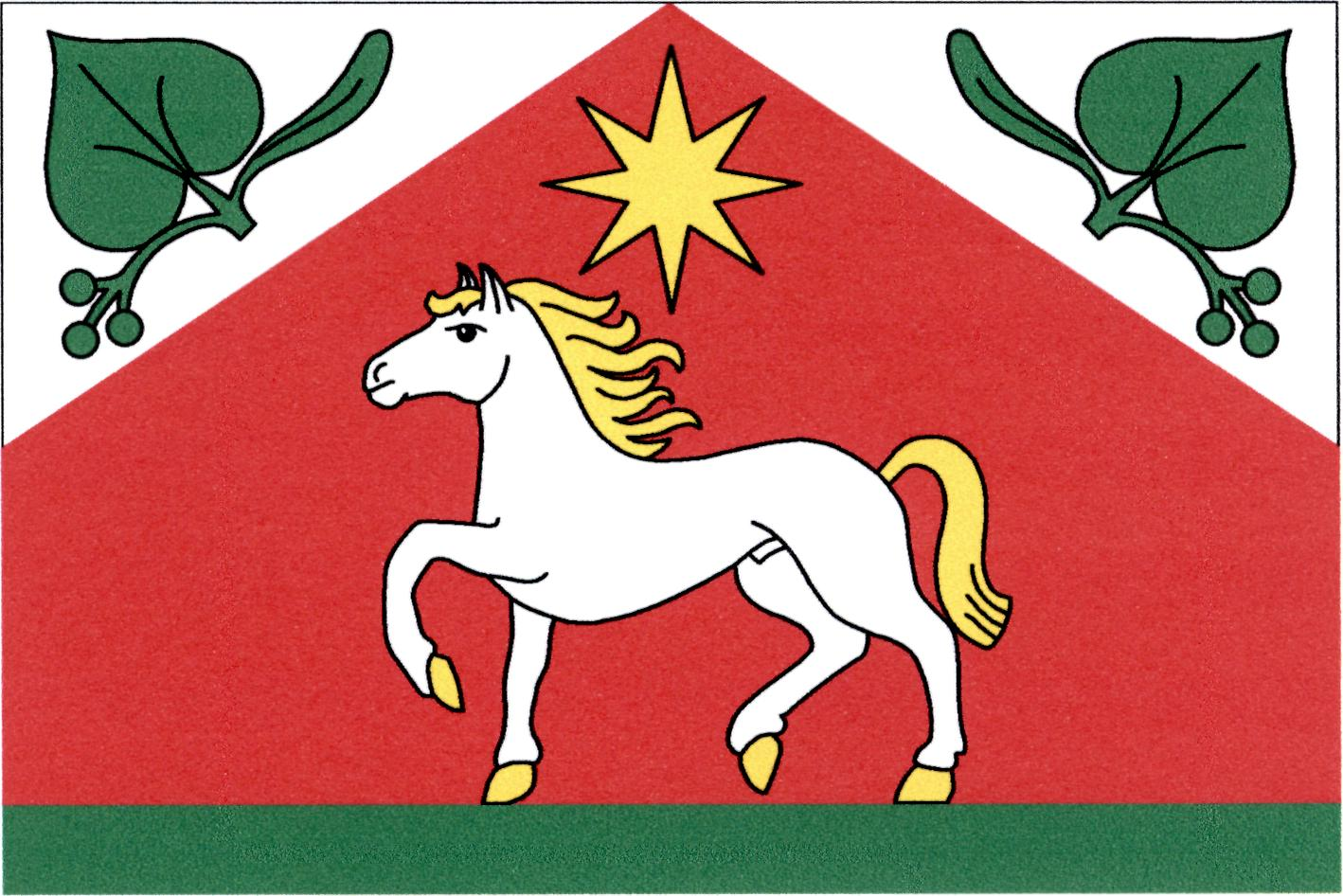
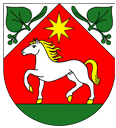
- Flag Coat of arms

- Location in the Czech Republic
- Coordinates: 49°44′30″N 17°19′25″E
- Country: Czech Republic
- Region: Olomouc
- District: Olomouc
- First mentioned: 1296

Area
  - Total: 9.94 km^{2} (3.84 sq mi)
- Elevation: 482 m (1,581 ft)

Population (2026-01-01)
  - Total: 170
  - Density: 17/km^{2} (44/sq mi)
- Time zone: UTC+1 (CET)
  - Summer (DST): UTC+2 (CEST)
- Postal code: 785 01
- Website: www.lipina.eu

Lipina is a municipality and village in Olomouc District in the Olomouc Region of the Czech Republic. It has about 200 inhabitants.

Lipina lies approximately 18 kilometres (11 mi) north of Olomouc and 213 km (132 mi) east of Prague.

== Demographics ==
Historical population
Year	Pop.	±%
1869	371	—
1880	376	+1.3%
1890	333	−11.4%
1900	312	−6.3%
1910	301	−3.5%
1921	318	+5.6%
1930	312	−1.9%
1950	201	−35.6%
1961	186	−7.5%
1970	173	−7.0%
1980	129	−25.4%
1991	105	−18.6%
2001	113	+7.6%
2011	152	+34.5%
2021	158	+3.9%
Source: Censuses
