= Verkhny Olshanets =

Verkhny Olshanets Верхний Ольшанец
- Selo
- Location within Belgorod Oblast Location within Russia
- Coordinates: 50°46′N 36°49′E
- Country: Russia
- Region: Belgorod Oblast
- District: Yakovlevsky District
- Time zone: UTC+3:00

Verkhny Olshanets (Russian: Верхний Ольшанец) is a rural locality (a selo) in Shebekinsky District, Yakovlevsky District, Russia. The population was 231 as of 2010. There are 9 streets.

== Geography ==
Verkhny Olshanets is located 34 km east of Stroitel (the district's administrative centre) by road. Rayevka is the nearest rural locality.
