= Želechovice =

- Municipality
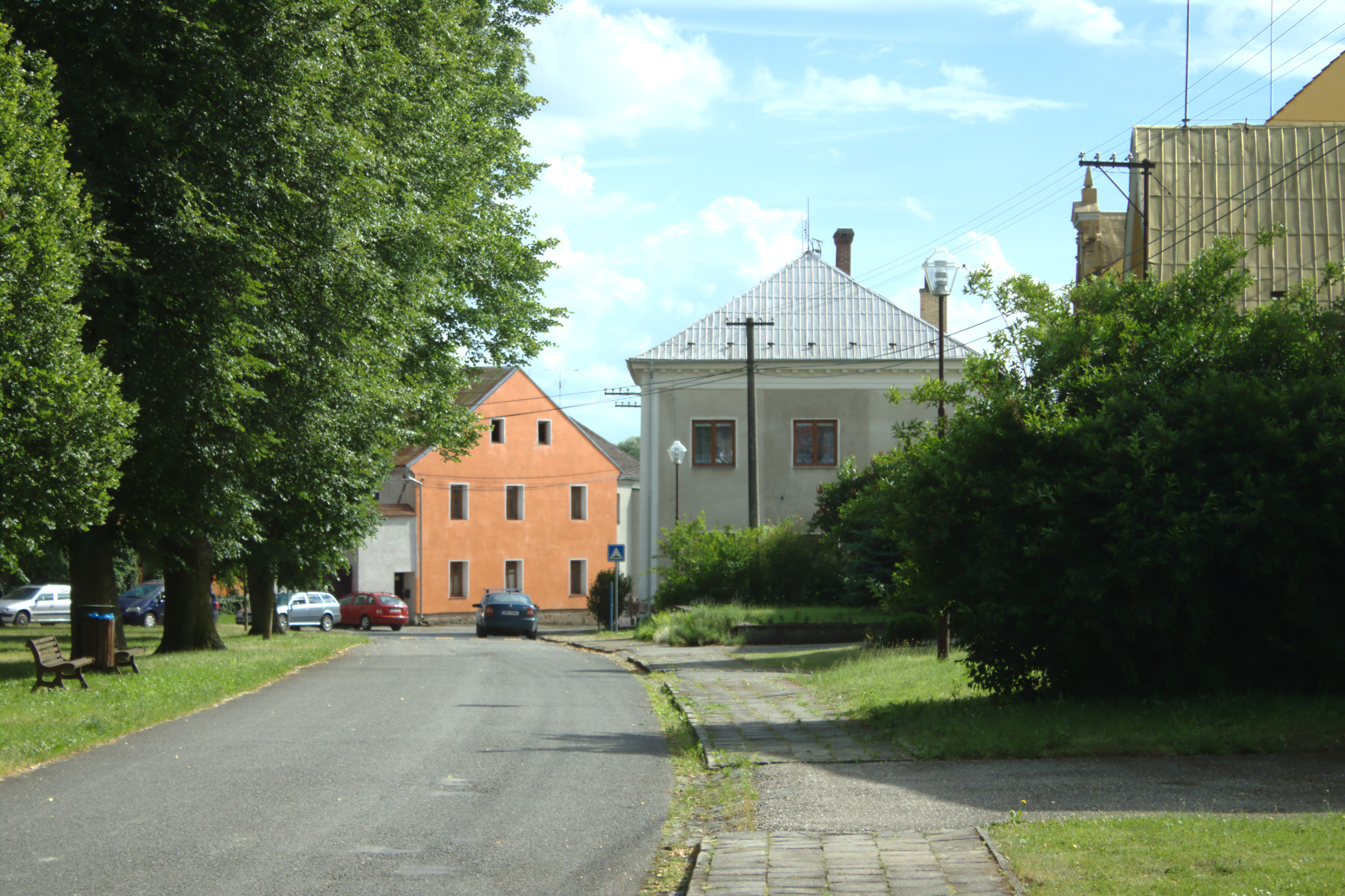
- Centre of Želechovice

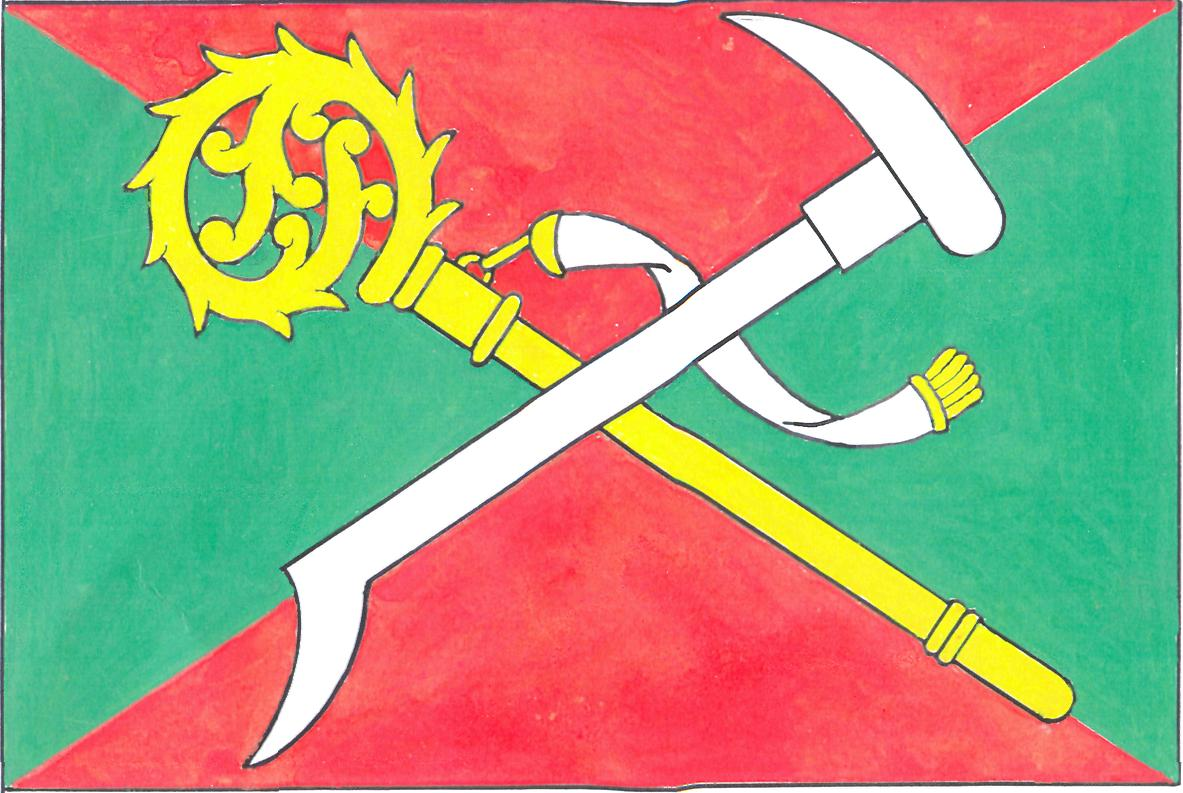
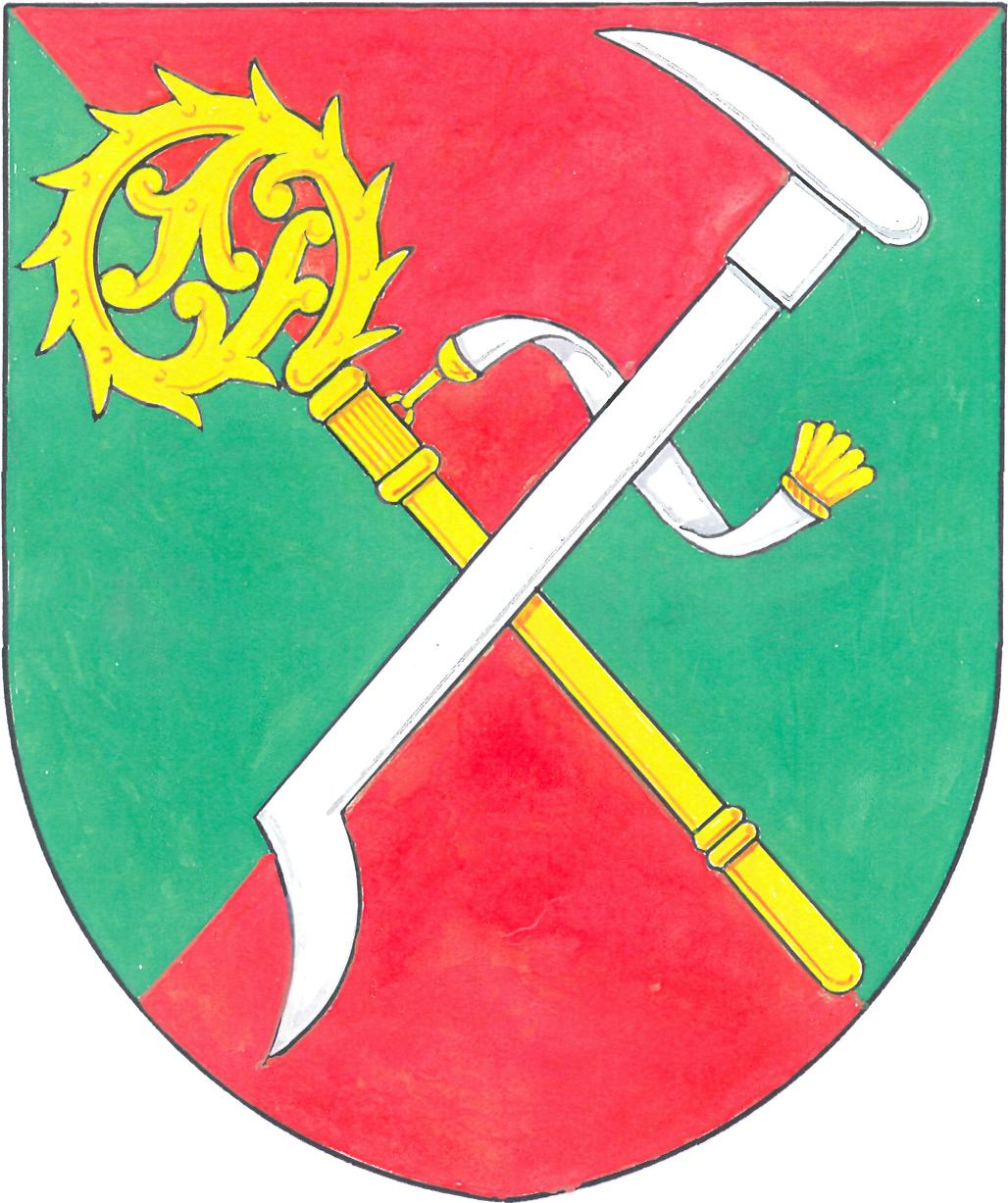
- Flag Coat of arms

- Location in the Czech Republic
- Coordinates: 49°45′15″N 17°8′38″E
- Country: Czech Republic
- Region: Olomouc
- District: Olomouc
- First mentioned: 1078

Area
  - Total: 6.12 km^{2} (2.36 sq mi)
- Elevation: 235 m (771 ft)

Population (2026-01-01)
  - Total: 250
  - Density: 41/km^{2} (110/sq mi)
- Time zone: UTC+1 (CET)
  - Summer (DST): UTC+2 (CEST)
- Postal code: 783 91
- Website: www.obeczelechovice.cz

Želechovice is a municipality and village in Olomouc District in the Olomouc Region of the Czech Republic. It has about 300 inhabitants.

Želechovice lies approximately 19 kilometres (12 mi) north-west of Olomouc and 199 km (124 mi) east of Prague.

== Demographics ==
Historical population
Year	Pop.	±%
1869	343	—
1880	335	−2.3%
1890	330	−1.5%
1900	318	−3.6%
1910	360	+13.2%
1921	337	−6.4%
1930	342	+1.5%
1950	260	−24.0%
1961	276	+6.2%
1970	236	−14.5%
1980	237	+0.4%
1991	203	−14.3%
2001	215	+5.9%
2011	231	+7.4%
2021	219	−5.2%
Source: Censuses
