= Prilepy, Repyovsky District, Voronezh Oblast =

Prilepy Прилепы
- Selo
- Location within Voronezh Oblast Location within Russia
- Coordinates: 51°03′N 38°55′E
- Country: Russia
- Region: Voronezh Oblast
- District: Repyovsky District
- Time zone: UTC+3:00

Prilepy (Russian: Прилепы) is a rural locality (a selo) in Kolbinskoye Rural Settlement, Repyovsky District, Voronezh Oblast, Russia. The population was 381 as of 2010. There are 6 streets.

== Geography ==
Prilepy is located 22 km east of Repyovka (the district's administrative centre) by road. Kolbino is the nearest rural locality.
