= Rzhavets =

Rzhavets Ржавец
- Selo
- Location within Belgorod Oblast Location within Russia
- Coordinates: 50°52′N 36°50′E
- Country: Russia
- Region: Belgorod Oblast
- District: Prokhorovsky District
- Time zone: UTC+3:00

Rzhavets (Russian: Ржавец) is a rural locality (a selo) and the administrative center of Rzhavetskoye Rural Settlement, Prokhorovsky District, Belgorod Oblast, Russia. The population was 481 as of 2010. There are 6 streets.

== Geography ==
Rzhavets is located 29 km south of Prokhorovka (the district's administrative centre) by road. Krasnoye Znamya is the nearest rural locality.
