= 158th Infantry Division (Wehrmacht) =

- 158. Infanterie-Division
- Active: April – May 1945
- Country: Nazi Germany
- Branch: Army
- Type: Infantry
- Size: Division

The 158th Infantry Division (German: 158. Infanteriedivision) was a German Army infantry division in World War II that was formed in April 1945.

== History ==
The 158th Infantry Division was raised in April 1945, where it was sent to the eastern front, which was approaching westwards to the German border.

== Commanders ==
- Generalleutnant August Schmidt (Apr 1945 - 8 May 1945)

== Operations Officers ==
- Major Karl-Albert Keerl (1 April 1945 – 2 May 1945)
