= Mladějov na Moravě =

- Municipality
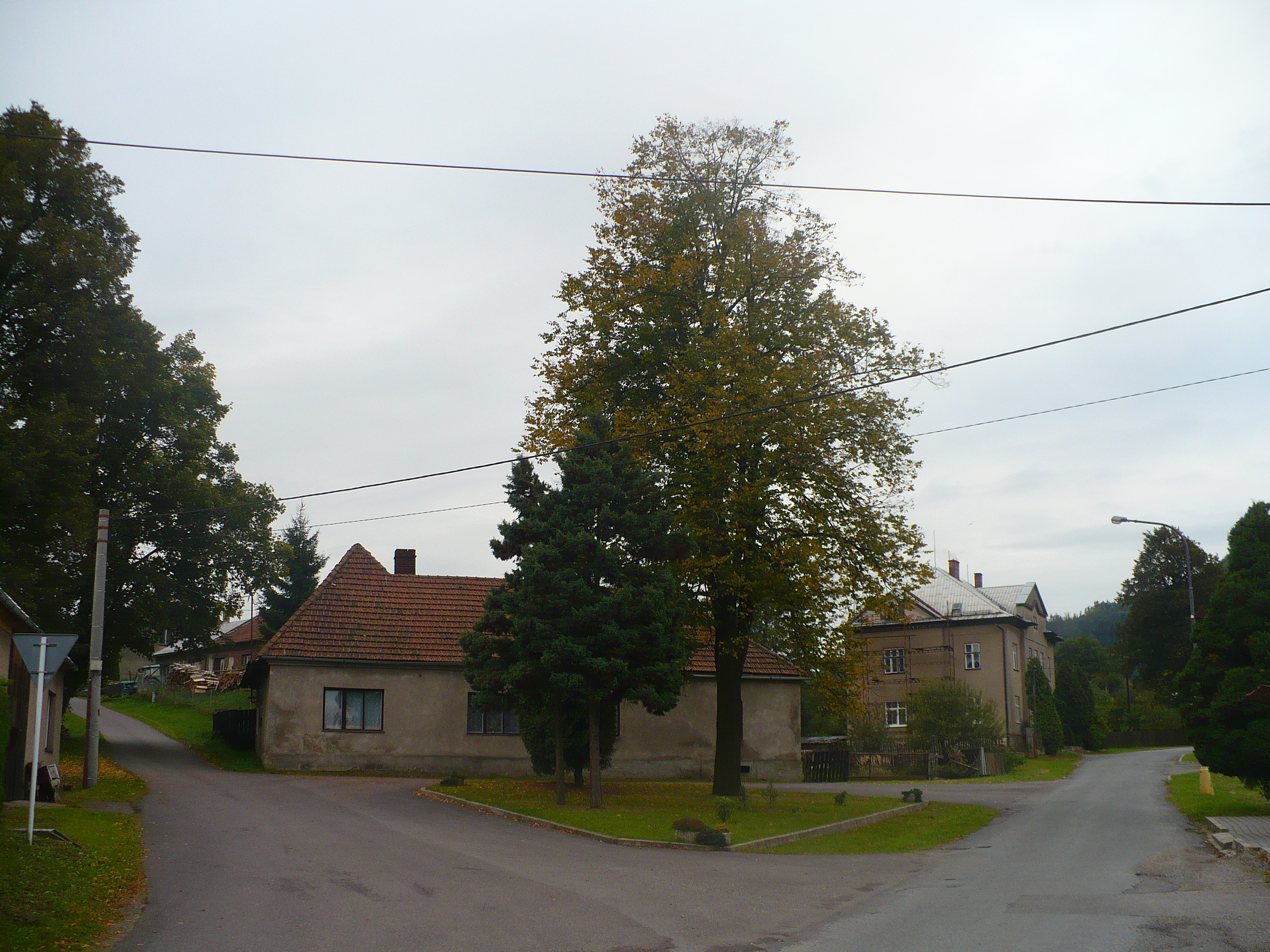
- Centre of Mladějov na Moravě

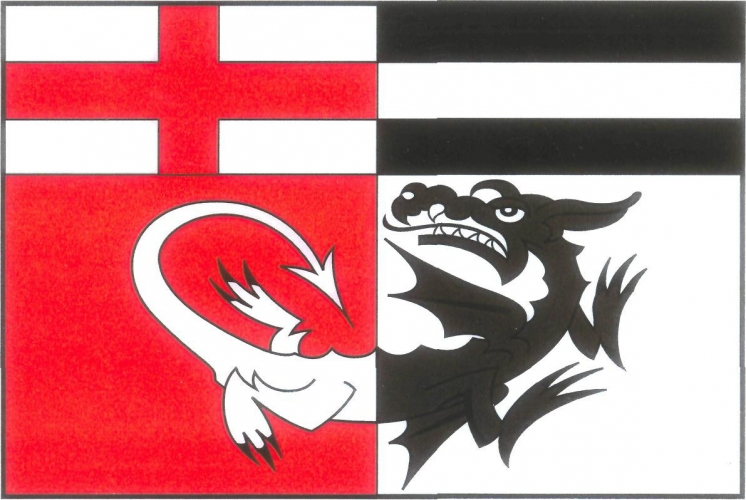
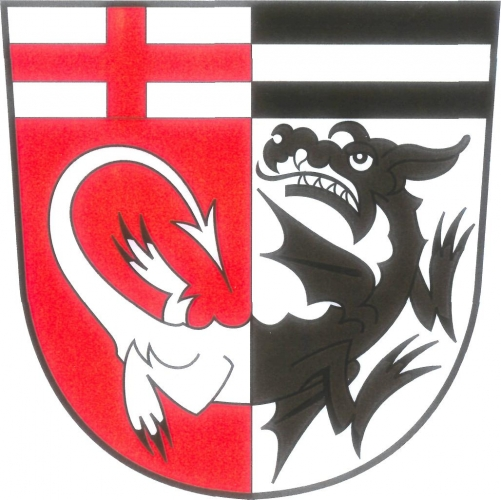
- Flag Coat of arms

- Location in the Czech Republic
- Coordinates: 49°49′21″N 16°35′28″E
- Country: Czech Republic
- Region: Pardubice
- District: Svitavy
- First mentioned: 1365

Area
  - Total: 9.27 km^{2} (3.58 sq mi)
- Elevation: 415 m (1,362 ft)

Population (2026-01-01)
  - Total: 461
  - Density: 49.7/km^{2} (129/sq mi)
- Time zone: UTC+1 (CET)
  - Summer (DST): UTC+2 (CEST)
- Postal code: 569 35
- Website: www.mladejovnamorave.cz

Mladějov na Moravě (German: Blosdorf) is a municipality and village in Svitavy District in the Pardubice Region of the Czech Republic. It has about 500 inhabitants.

Mladějov na Moravě lies approximately 12 kilometres (7 mi) north-east of Svitavy, 63 km (39 mi) south-east of Pardubice, and 159 km (99 mi) east of Prague.

== Demographics ==
Historical population
Year	Pop.	±%
1869	902	—
1880	974	+8.0%
1890	929	−4.6%
1900	918	−1.2%
1910	873	−4.9%
1921	847	−3.0%
1930	894	+5.5%
1950	630	−29.5%
1961	668	+6.0%
1970	592	−11.4%
1980	607	+2.5%
1991	494	−18.6%
2001	474	−4.0%
2011	435	−8.2%
2021	429	−1.4%
Source: Censuses

== Notable people ==
- Franz Abdon Ulinski (1890–1974), Austrian engineer
