= Křečkov =

- Municipality
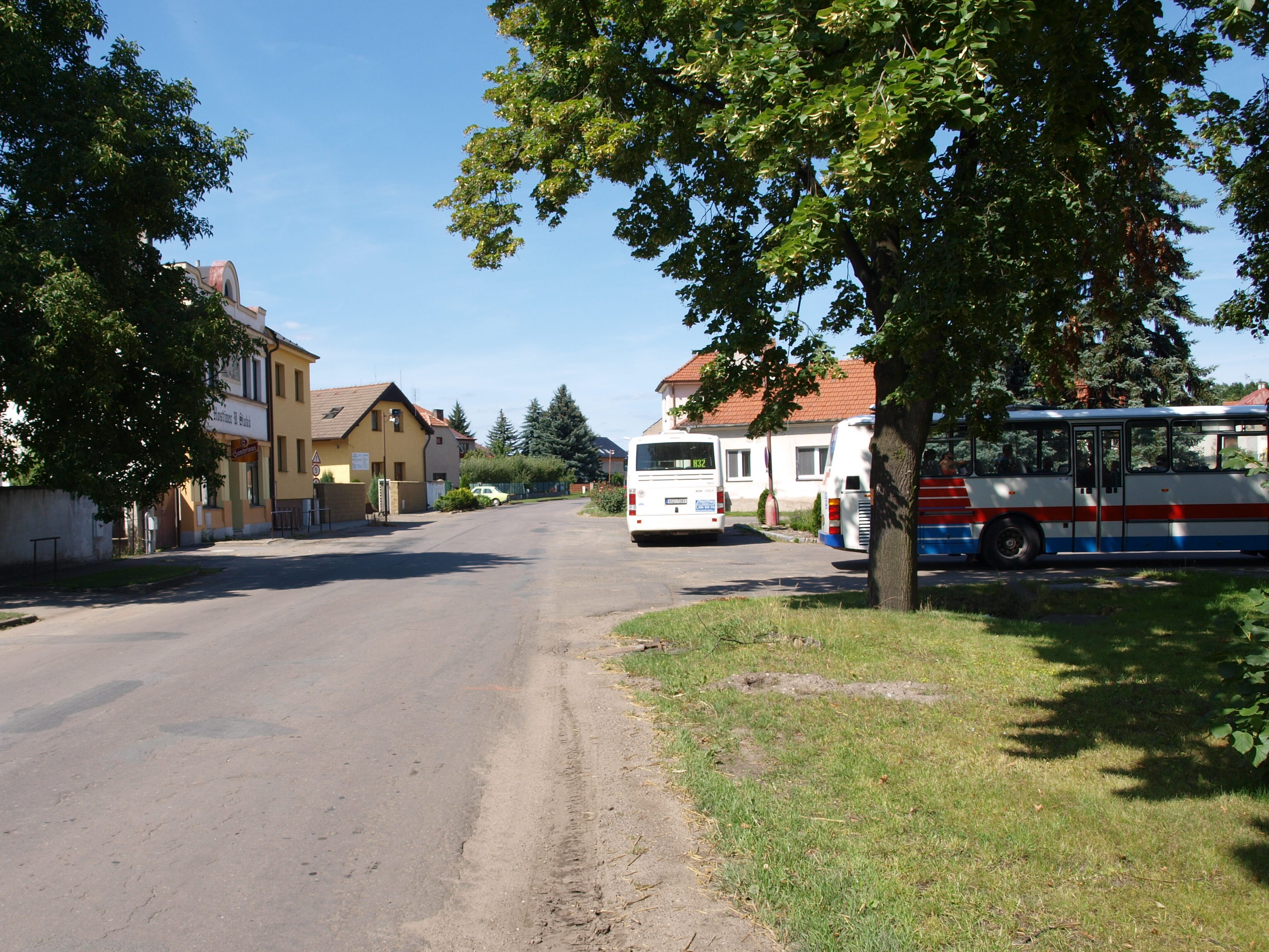
- Centre of Křečkov

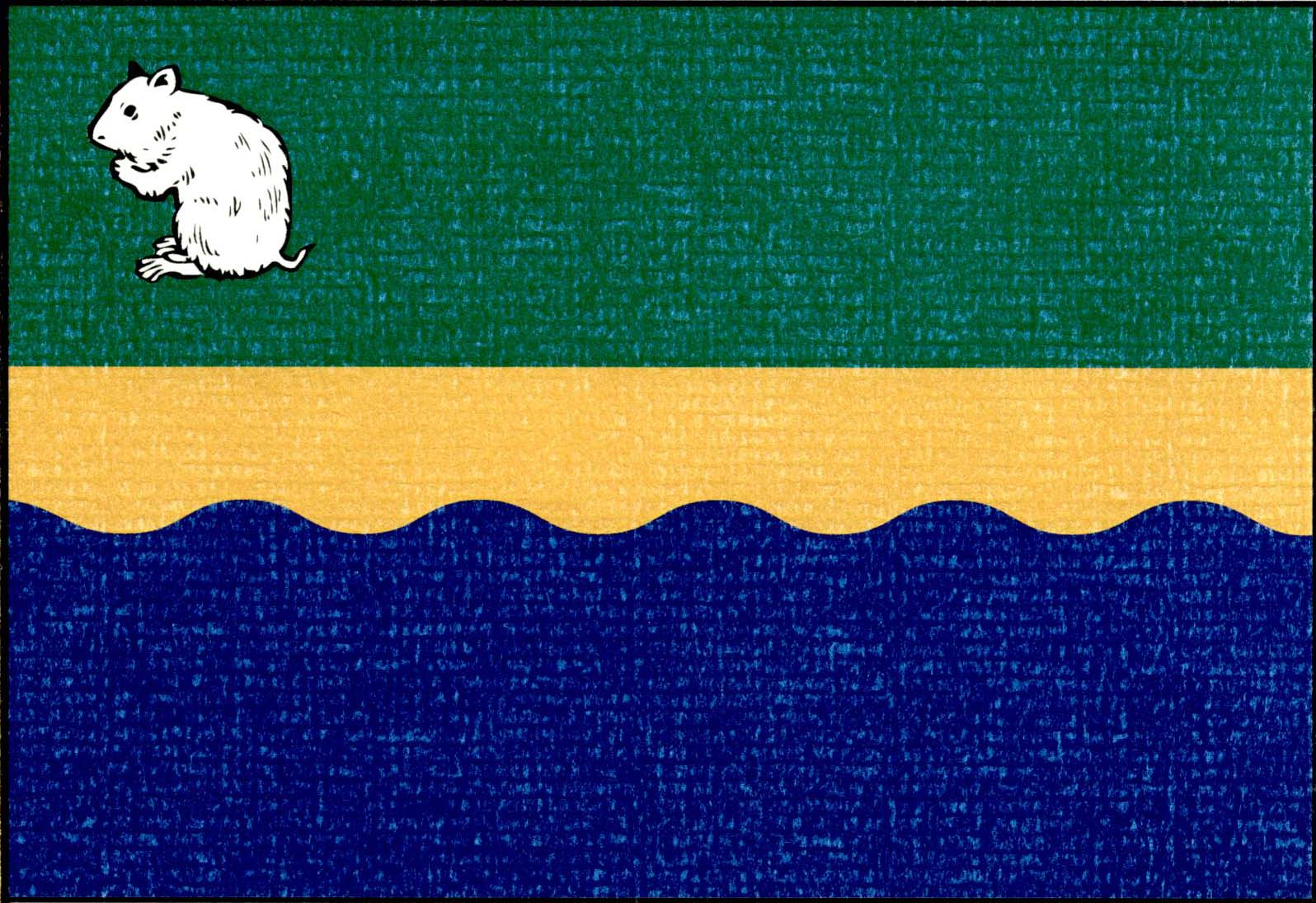
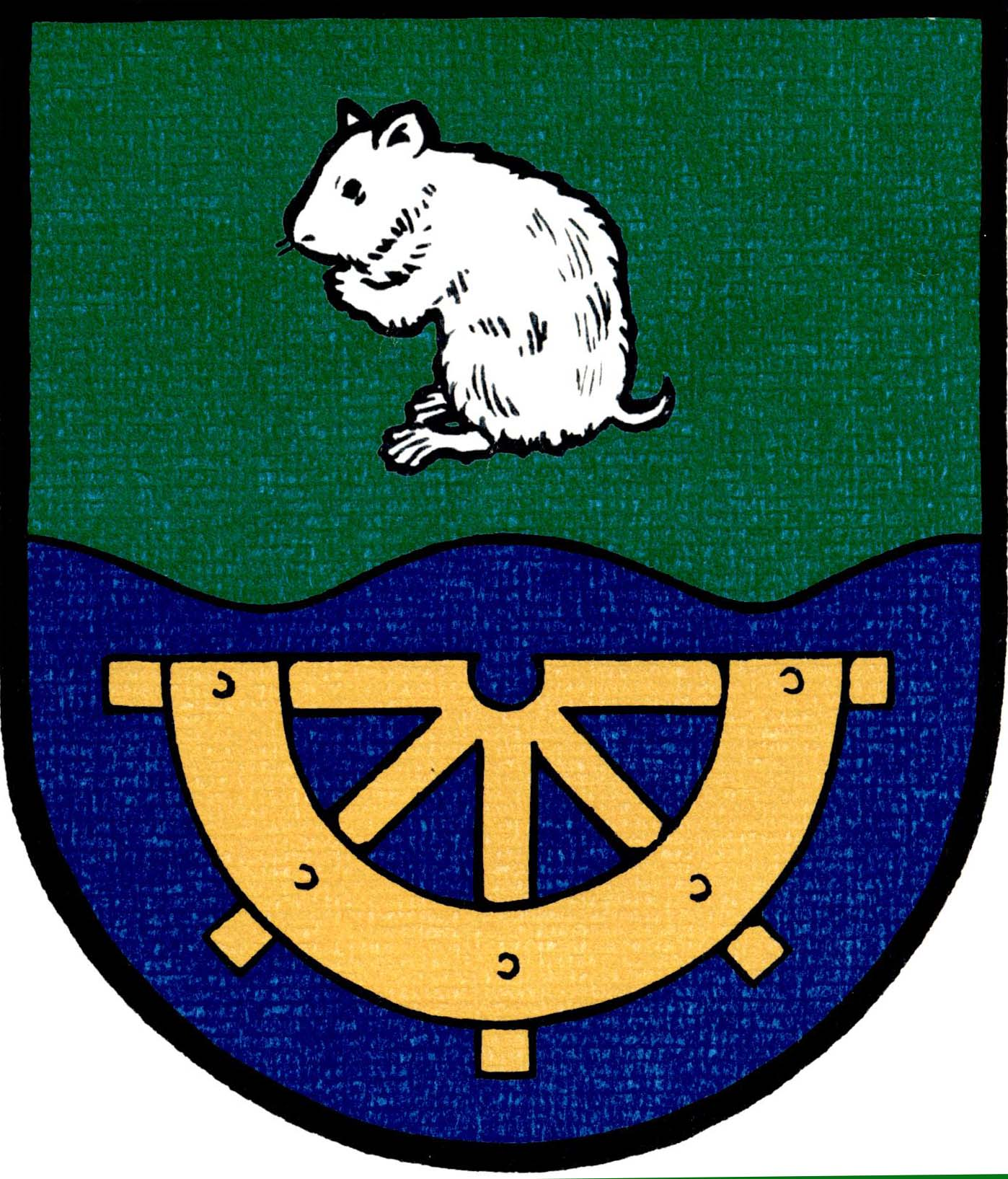
- Flag Coat of arms

- Location in the Czech Republic
- Coordinates: 50°10′48″N 15°6′52″E
- Country: Czech Republic
- Region: Central Bohemian
- District: Nymburk
- First mentioned: 1345

Area
  - Total: 5.13 km^{2} (1.98 sq mi)
- Elevation: 184 m (604 ft)

Population (2026-01-01)
  - Total: 449
  - Density: 87.5/km^{2} (227/sq mi)
- Time zone: UTC+1 (CET)
  - Summer (DST): UTC+2 (CEST)
- Postal code: 290 01
- Website: www.kreckov.cz

Křečkov is a municipality and village in Nymburk District in the Central Bohemian Region of the Czech Republic. It has about 400 inhabitants.

== Demographics ==
Historical population
Year	Pop.	±%
1869	301	—
1880	382	+26.9%
1890	425	+11.3%
1900	435	+2.4%
1910	488	+12.2%
1921	502	+2.9%
1930	524	+4.4%
1950	493	−5.9%
1961	473	−4.1%
1970	376	−20.5%
1980	373	−0.8%
1991	346	−7.2%
2001	346	+0.0%
2011	347	+0.3%
2021	427	+23.1%
Source: Censuses
