= Franz Abdon Ulinski =

Austrian engineer

- Born: January 1, 1890; Mladějov na Moravě, Moravia, Austria-Hungary (now Czech Republic)
- Died: January 1, 1974 (aged 84)
- Occupation: Engineer
- Known for: Early proposals in spacecraft propulsion
- Notable work: "Die Möglichkeit der Weltraumfahrt" (1928)

Franz Abdon Ulinski (1890–1974) was an Austrian engineer who was known for his early proposals in spacecraft propulsion.

== Biography ==
Born in Mladějov na Moravě, Moravia (now part of the Czech Republic), Ulinski completed his secondary education in Linz, Austria, in 1910 before joining the Austro-Hungarian Army. Ulinski served in various roles and as a technical officer in the aviation corps during World War I.

In 1919, Ulinski proposed a spacecraft design powered by jets of electrons or ions. He published his ideas in a Viennese aeronautical journal in 1920, outlining two potential energy sources: solar panels for energy storage and atomic disintegration for power generation. At the time, his propulsion concepts were not widely adopted, likely due to the energy requirements needed to escape Earth's gravity.

Ulinski's work is recognized for anticipating later advancements in ion propulsion technology. Ion thrusters have been utilized in spacecraft such as Deep Space One, which conducted flybys of an asteroid and approached a comet, as well as in the stabilization of satellites in Earth orbit.
