= Melikhovo, Belgorod Oblast =

Melikhovo Мелихово
- Selo
- Location within Belgorod Oblast Location within Russia
- Coordinates: 50°41′N 36°47′E
- Country: Russia
- Region: Belgorod Oblast
- District: Korochansky District
- Time zone: UTC+3:00

Melikhovo (Russian: Мелихово) is a rural locality (a selo) and the administrative center of Melikhovskoye Rural Settlement, Korochansky District, Belgorod Oblast, Russia. The population was 977 as of 2010. There are 11 streets.

== Geography ==
Melikhovo is located 35 km southwest of Korocha (the district's administrative centre) by road. Shlyakhovo is the nearest rural locality.
