= Shakhovo, Kursk Oblast =

Rural locality in Kursk Oblast, Russia

Shakhovo Шахово
- Selo
- Interactive map of Shakhovo
- Location of Shakhovo Shakhovo (Kursk Oblast)
- Coordinates: 52°04′17″N 35°42′09″E
- Country: Russia
- Federal subject: Kursk Oblast
- Administrative district: Fatezhsky District
- SelsovietSelsoviet: Soldatsky
- Elevation: 185 m (607 ft)

Population (2010 Census)
  - Total: 18
  - Estimate (2010): 18 (0%)

Municipal status
  - Municipal district: Fatezhsky Municipal District
  - Rural settlement: Soldatsky Selsoviet Rural Settlement
- Time zone: UTC+3 (MSK)
- Postal code: 307106
- Dialing code: +7 47144
- OKTMO ID: 38644468151
- Website: мосолдатский.рф

Shakhovo (Russian: Шахово) is a rural locality (Russian: село, lit. 'village') in Soldatsky Selsoviet Rural Settlement, Fatezhsky District, Kursk Oblast, Russia. Population: 18 (2010 census); 45 (2002 census); 83 (1989 Soviet census).

== Geography ==
The village is located on the Usozha River (a left tributary of the Svapa in the basin of the Seym), 93 km from the Russia–Ukraine border, 50 km north-west of Kursk, 10 km west of the district center – the town Fatezh, 2.5 km from the selsoviet center – Soldatskoye.

Climate

Shakhovo has a warm-summer humid continental climate (Dfb in the Köppen climate classification).

== Transport ==
Shakhovo is located 8 km from the federal route M-2 Crimea Highway as part of the European route E105, 3 km from the road of regional importance 38K-038 (Fatezh – Dmitriyev), 2 km from the road of intermunicipal significance 38Н-679 (38K-038 – Soldatskoye – Shuklino), 26 km from the nearest railway halt 29 km (railway line Arbuzovo – Luzhki-Orlovskiye).

The rural locality is situated 53 km from Kursk Vostochny Airport, 168 km from Belgorod International Airport and 244 km from Voronezh Peter the Great Airport.
