= Rostoklaty =

- Municipality
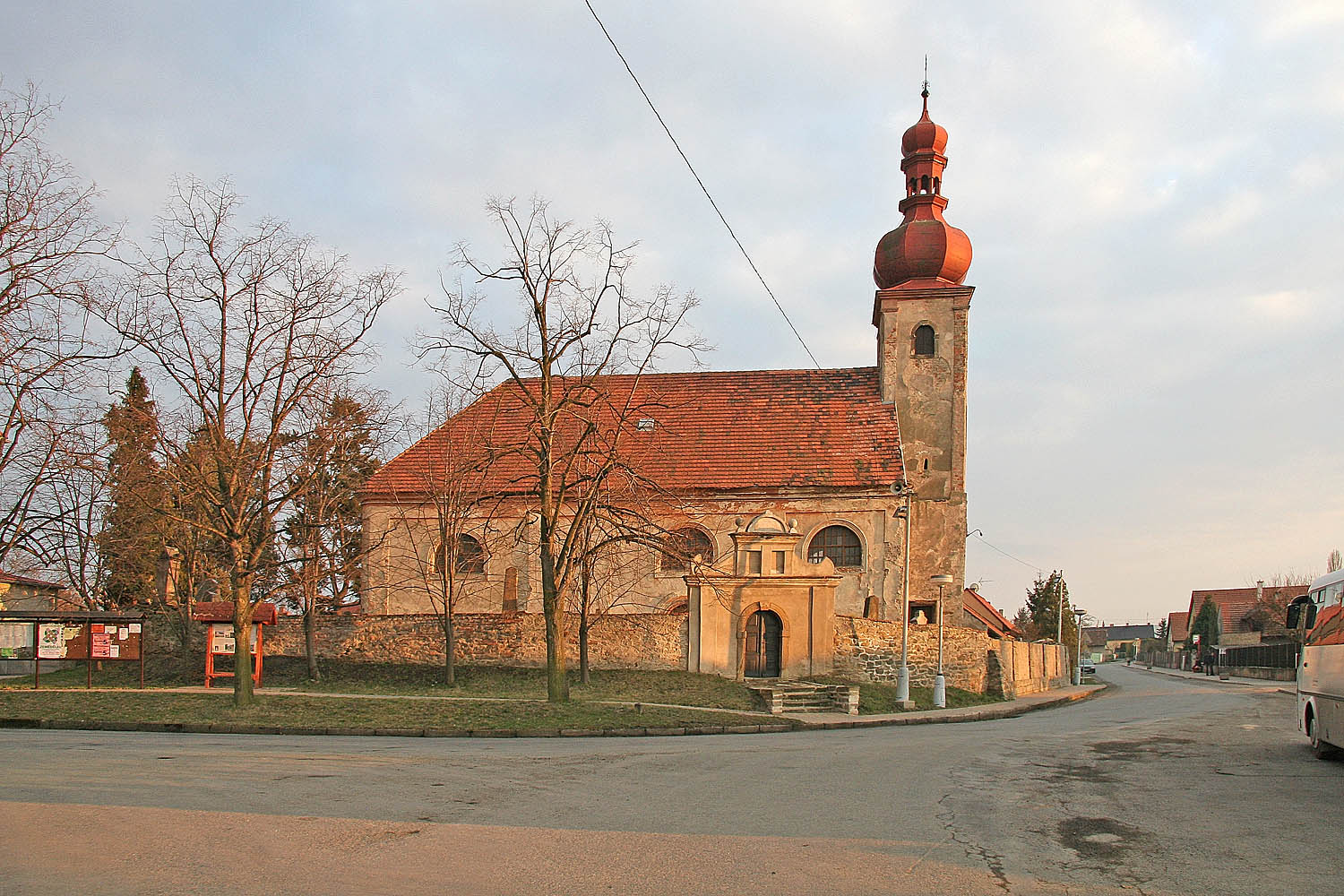
- Church of Saint Martin

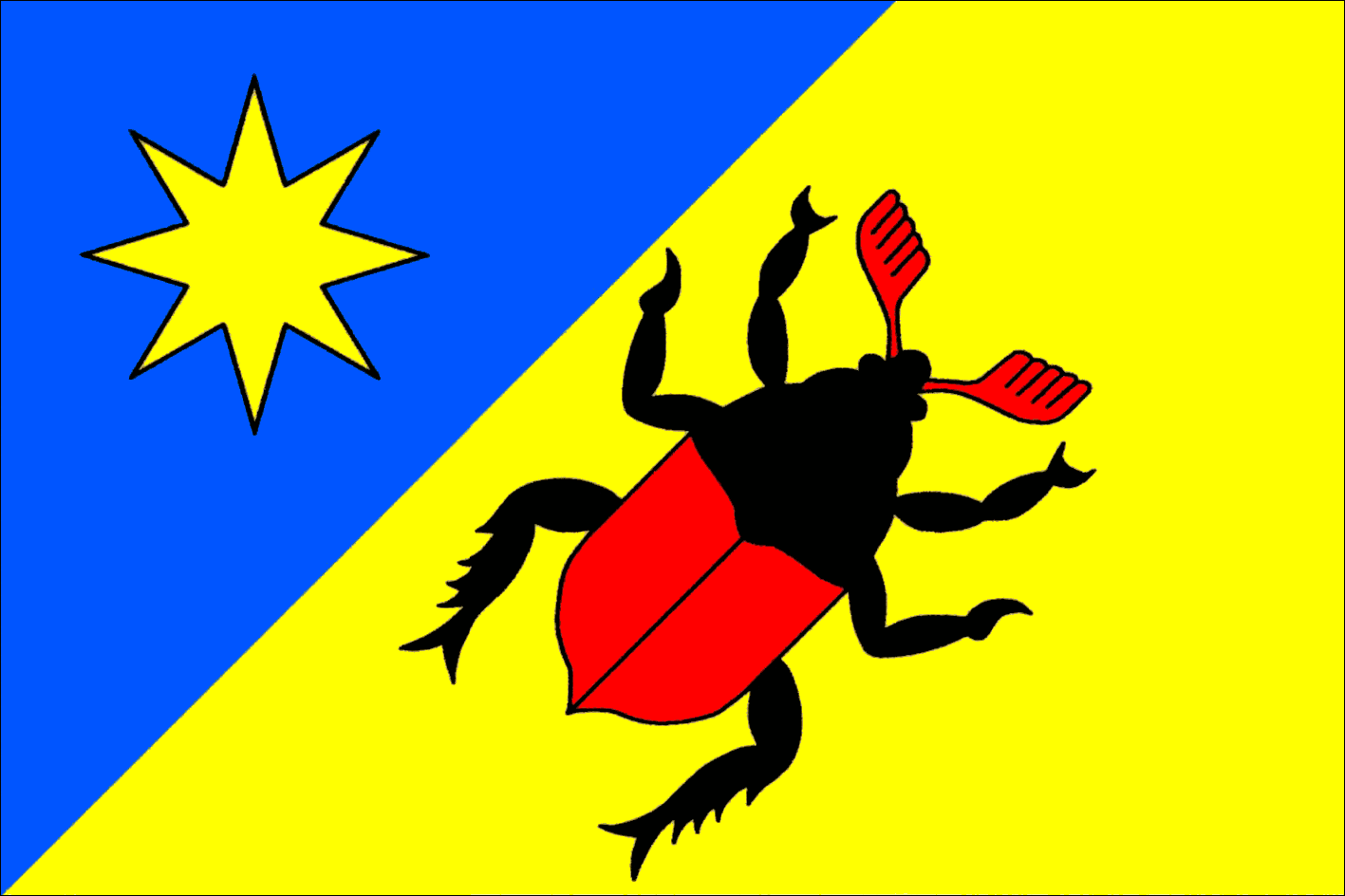
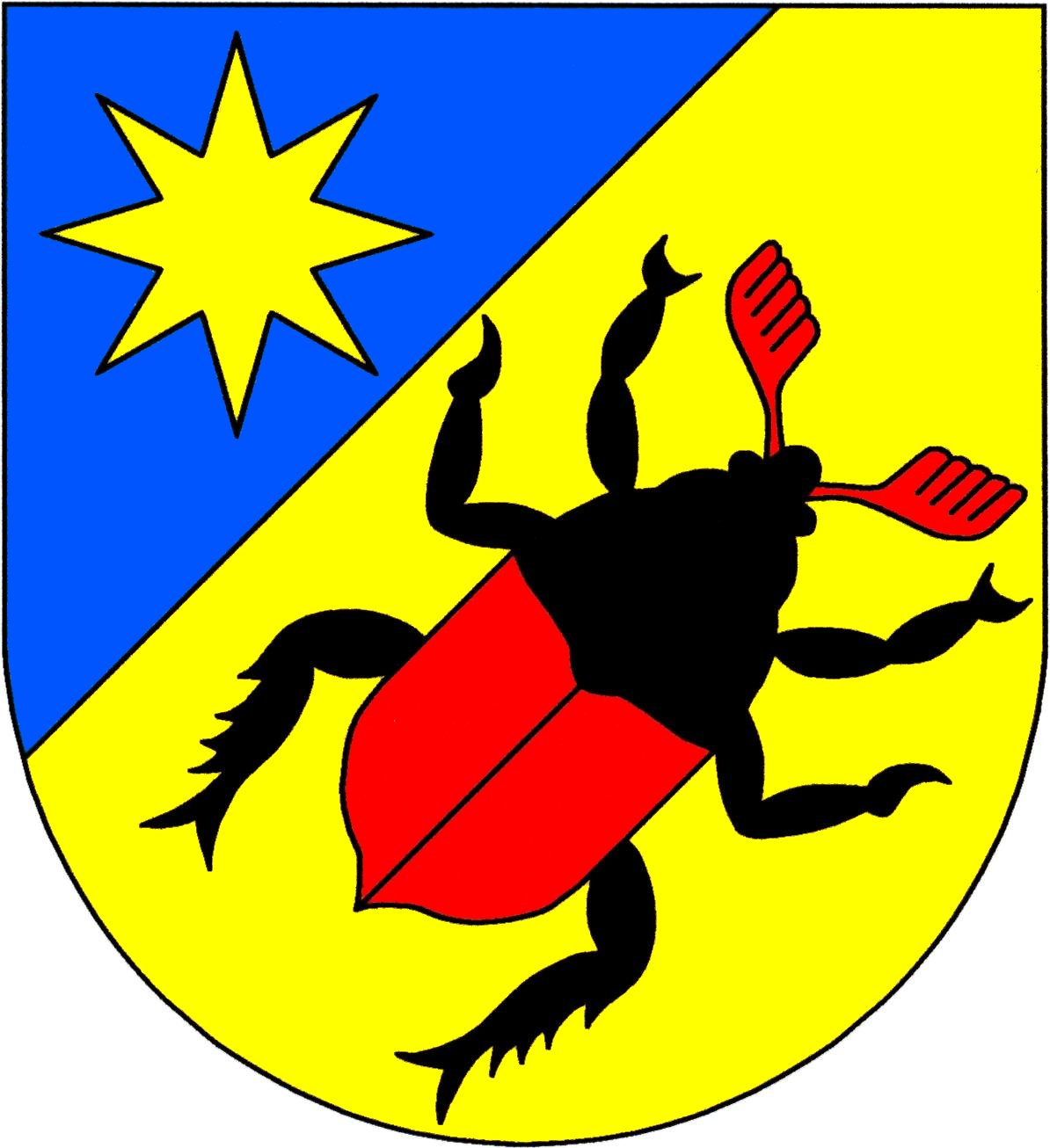
- Flag Coat of arms

- Location in the Czech Republic
- Coordinates: 50°4′27″N 14°48′5″E
- Country: Czech Republic
- Region: Central Bohemian
- District: Kolín
- First mentioned: 1295

Area
  - Total: 7.03 km^{2} (2.71 sq mi)
- Elevation: 255 m (837 ft)

Population (2026-01-01)
  - Total: 652
  - Density: 92.7/km^{2} (240/sq mi)
- Time zone: UTC+1 (CET)
  - Summer (DST): UTC+2 (CEST)
- Postal codes: 281 71, 282 01
- Website: rostoklaty.cz

Rostoklaty is a municipality and village in Kolín District in the Central Bohemian Region of the Czech Republic. It has about 700 inhabitants.

== Administrative division ==
Rostoklaty consists of two municipal parts (in brackets population according to the 2021 census):

- Rostoklaty (525)
- Nová Ves II (83)

== Demographics ==
Historical population
| Year | Pop. | ±% |
|---|---|---|
| 1869 | 493 | — |
| 1880 | 608 | +23.3% |
| 1890 | 570 | −6.2% |
| 1900 | 593 | +4.0% |
| 1910 | 654 | +10.3% |
| 1921 | 613 | −6.3% |
| 1930 | 653 | +6.5% |
| 1950 | 476 | −27.1% |
| 1961 | 496 | +4.2% |
| 1970 | 498 | +0.4% |
| 1980 | 441 | −11.4% |
| 1991 | 425 | −3.6% |
| 2001 | 402 | −5.4% |
| 2011 | 446 | +10.9% |
| 2021 | 608 | +36.3% |
Source: Censuses
