= Hnojice =

- Municipality
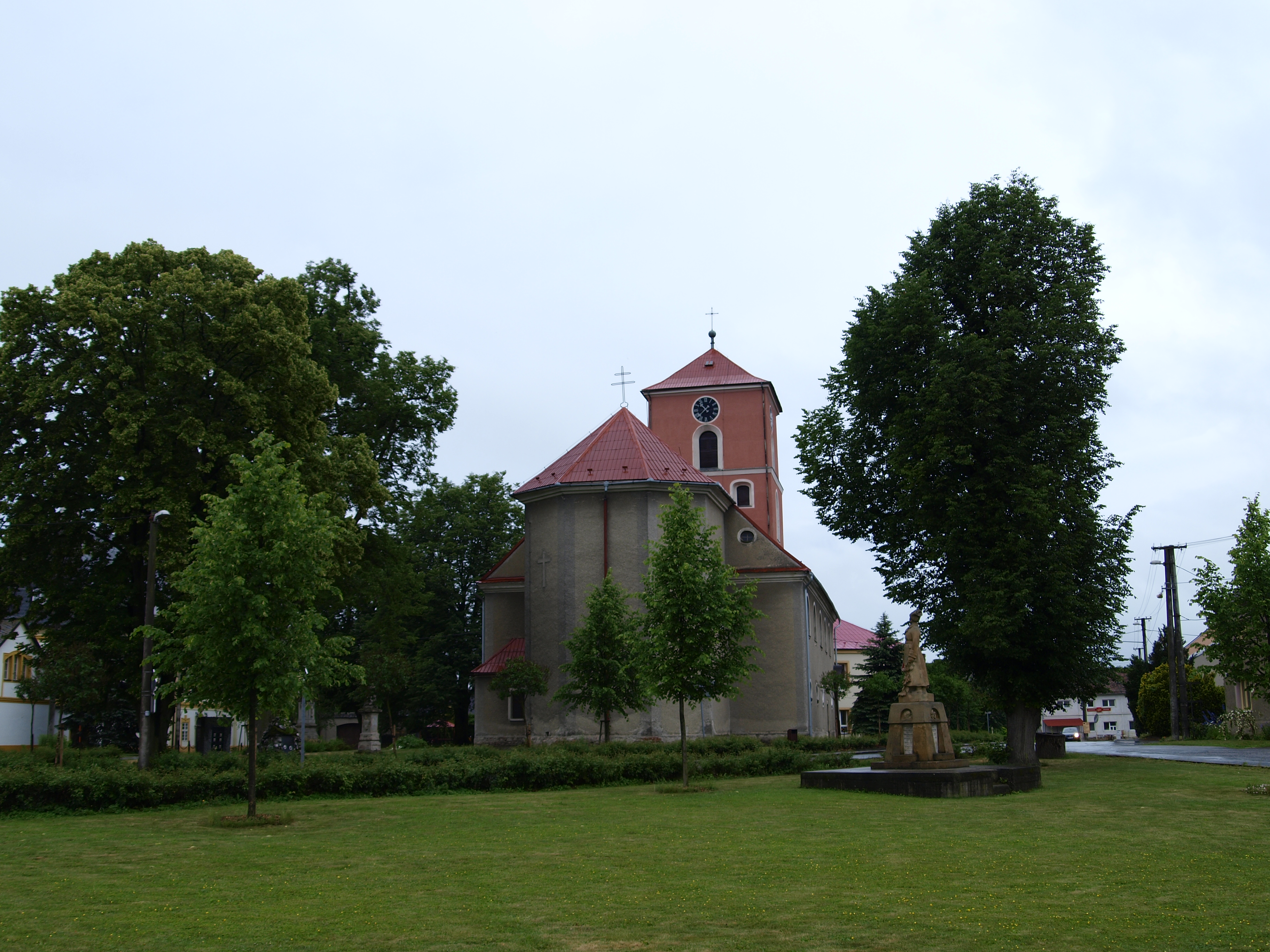
- Centre of Hnojice with Church of the Assumption of the Virgin Mary

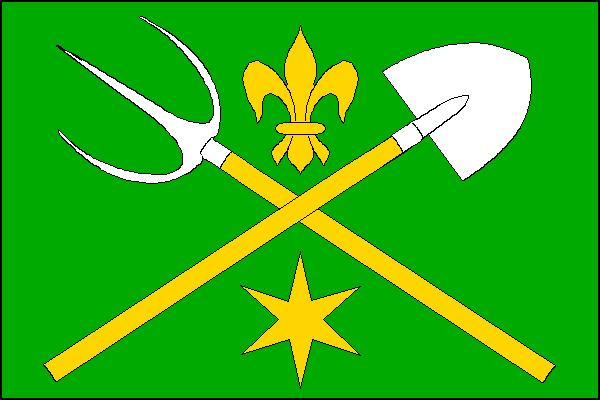
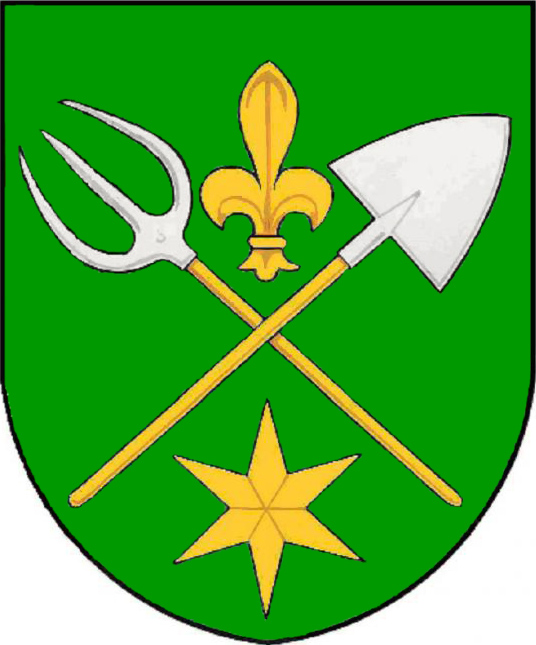
- Flag Coat of arms

- Location in the Czech Republic
- Coordinates: 49°42′59″N 17°13′27″E
- Country: Czech Republic
- Region: Olomouc
- District: Olomouc
- First mentioned: 1141

Area
  - Total: 9.74 km^{2} (3.76 sq mi)
- Elevation: 227 m (745 ft)

Population (2026-01-01)
  - Total: 659
  - Density: 67.7/km^{2} (175/sq mi)
- Time zone: UTC+1 (CET)
  - Summer (DST): UTC+2 (CEST)
- Postal code: 785 01
- Website: www.hnojice.cz

Hnojice is a municipality and village in Olomouc District in the Olomouc Region of the Czech Republic. It has about 700 inhabitants.

Hnojice lies approximately 15 kilometres (9 mi) north of Olomouc and 206 km (128 mi) east of Prague.

== Demographics ==
Historical population
| Year | Pop. | ±% |
|---|---|---|
| 1869 | 799 | — |
| 1880 | 856 | +7.1% |
| 1890 | 895 | +4.6% |
| 1900 | 892 | −0.3% |
| 1910 | 924 | +3.6% |
| 1921 | 984 | +6.5% |
| 1930 | 923 | −6.2% |
| 1950 | 661 | −28.4% |
| 1961 | 641 | −3.0% |
| 1970 | 621 | −3.1% |
| 1980 | 573 | −7.7% |
| 1991 | 558 | −2.6% |
| 2001 | 560 | +0.4% |
| 2011 | 580 | +3.6% |
| 2021 | 621 | +7.1% |
Source: Censuses
