= Teterevino =

Teterevino Тетеревино
- Selo
- Location within Belgorod Oblast Location within Russia
- Coordinates: 50°52′N 36°37′E
- Country: Russia
- Region: Belgorod Oblast
- District: Prokhorovsky District
- Time zone: UTC+3:00

Teterevino (Russian: Тетеревино) is a rural locality (a selo) in Prokhorovsky District, Belgorod Oblast, Russia. The population was 328 as of 2010. There are 7 streets.

== Geography ==
Teterevino is located 25 km southwest of Prokhorovka (the district's administrative centre) by road. Volobuyevka is the nearest rural locality.
