= Krasny Khutor, Kursk Oblast =

Rural locality in Kursk Oblast, Russia

Krasny Khutor Красный Хутор
- Settlement
- Interactive map of Krasny Khutor
- Location of Krasny Khutor Krasny Khutor (Kursk Oblast)
- Coordinates: 51°44′14″N 35°29′32″E
- Country: Russia
- Federal subject: Kursk Oblast
- Administrative district: Kurchatovsky District
- SelsovietSelsoviet: Makarovsky

Population (2010 Census)
  - Total: 0
  - Estimate (2010): 0 )

Municipal status
  - Municipal district: Kurchatovsky Municipal District
  - Rural settlement: Makarovsky Selsoviet Rural Settlement
- Time zone: UTC+3 (MSK)
- Postal code: 307226
- Dialing code: +7 47131
- OKTMO ID: 38621422111
- Website: макаровский-сельсовет.рф

Krasny Khutor (Russian: Красный Хутор) is a rural locality (a settlement) in Makarovsky Selsoviet Rural Settlement, Kurchatovsky District, Kursk Oblast, Russia. Population: 0 (2010 census); 5 (2002 census);

== Geography ==
The settlement is located 62 km from the Russia–Ukraine border, 48.5 km west of Kursk, 14.5 km north-west of the district center – the town Kurchatov, 5.5 km from the selsoviet center – Makarovka.

Climate

Krasny Khutor has a warm-summer humid continental climate (Dfb in the Köppen climate classification).

== Transport ==
Krasny Khutor is located 40 km from the federal route M-2 Crimea Highway, 11.5 km from the road of regional importance 38K-017 (Kursk – Lgov – Rylsk – border with Ukraine), 15 km from the road 38K-023 (Lgov – Konyshyovka), 5 km from the road of intermunicipal significance 38H-362 (38K-017 – Nikolayevka – Shirkovo), 5 km from the road 38H-366 (38N-362 – Makarovka – Lgov), 12 km from the nearest railway station Lukashevka (railway line Lgov I — Kursk).

The rural locality is situated 54.5 km from Kursk Vostochny Airport, 142 km from Belgorod International Airport and 257 km from Voronezh Peter the Great Airport.
