= Netřebice (Nymburk District) =

- Municipality
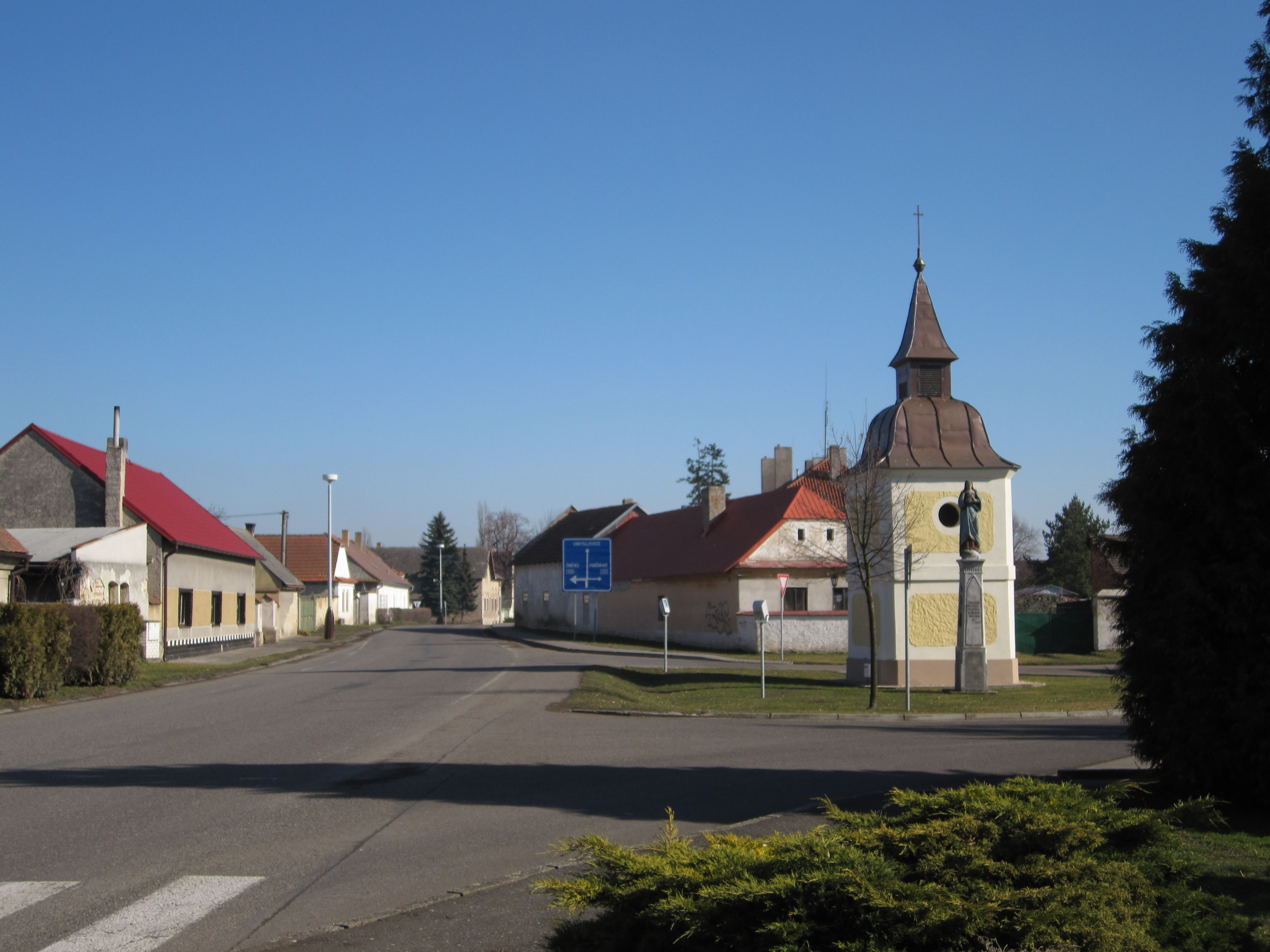
- Centre of Netřebice

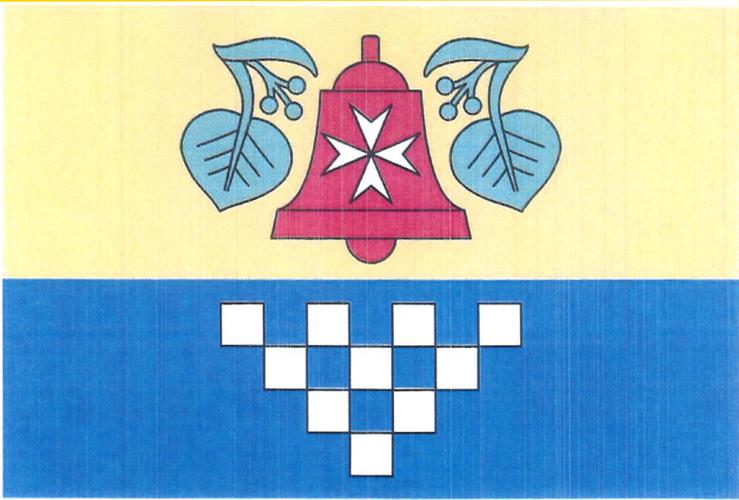
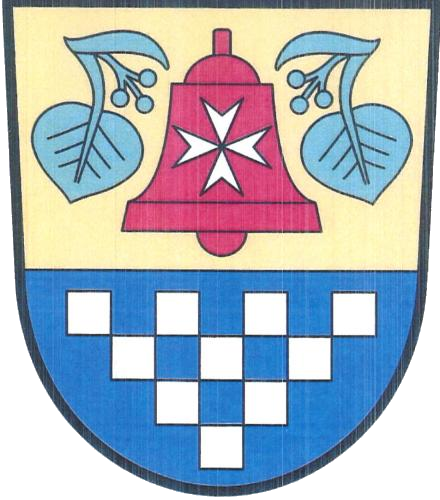
- Flag Coat of arms

- Location in the Czech Republic
- Coordinates: 50°12′47″N 15°8′34″E
- Country: Czech Republic
- Region: Central Bohemian
- District: Nymburk
- First mentioned: 1186

Area
  - Total: 5.60 km^{2} (2.16 sq mi)
- Elevation: 188 m (617 ft)

Population (2026-01-01)
  - Total: 260
  - Density: 46/km^{2} (120/sq mi)
- Time zone: UTC+1 (CET)
  - Summer (DST): UTC+2 (CEST)
- Postal code: 288 02
- Website: netrebice.cz

Netřebice is a municipality and village in Nymburk District in the Central Bohemian Region of the Czech Republic. It has about 300 inhabitants.

== Etymology ==
The name is derived from the personal name Netřeba, meaning "the village of Netřeba's people".

== Geography ==
Netřebice is located about 8 kilometres (5 mi) east of Nymburk and 45 km (28 mi) east of Prague. It lies in a flat agricultural landscape in the Central Elbe Table. The stream Velenický potok flows through the municipality.

== History ==
The first written mention of Netřebice is from 1186, when Duchess Elizabeth donated the village to the Knights Hospitaller.

== Demographics ==
Historical population

Year	Pop.	±%
1869	304	—
1880	405	+33.2%
1890	463	+14.3%
1900	481	+3.9%
1910	468	−2.7%

Year	Pop.	±%
1921	466	−0.4%
1930	441	−5.4%
1950	324	−26.5%
1961	320	−1.2%
1970	286	−10.6%

Year	Pop.	±%
1980	256	−10.5%
1991	226	−11.7%
2001	221	−2.2%
2011	198	−10.4%
2021	260	+31.3%

Source: Censuses

== Transport ==
There are no railways or major roads passing through the municipality.

== Sights ==
Netřebice is poor in monuments. The only protected cultural monument is a late Baroque gate to a homestead from the mid-19th century. The main landmark of the centre of Netřebice is a chapel with a belfry from 1859.
