= Lili Halpern-Neuda =

- Born: August 2, 1882 Vienna, Austria-Hungary
- Died: November 29, 1941 (aged 59) Auschwitz, Poland
- Relatives: Fanny Neuda (grandmother)

Lili Nent Halpern-Neuda (2 August 1882 – 29 November 1941) was a poet and a writer an Austrian Jewish woman who was murdered in the Holocaust.

== Biography ==
Lili Neuda was born and raised in Vienna, the only daughter of Moritz Neuda, a journalist at the newspaper Neue Freie Presse, and Rosa (née Bernstein), a singer born in Poland. Her grandmother was the preacher and writer Fanny Neuda, and her grandfather was Rabbi Abraham Neuda.

Halpern was a poet. Her first poetry book was published in 1908.

In 1914, Halpern-Neuda was a member of the Austrian committee of the "Book Trade" section at the international exhibition "The Woman in the Book Industry and Graphic Arts" in Leipzig, which presented women's contributions to literature, publishing, and graphic arts.

In 1919, her most famous poetry book, Eingemauert, was published by Anzengruber publication.

In 1919 and 1920, a literary reading by Hilda Wegner took place at the Konzerthaus, Vienna, featuring, among others, works by Lili Halpern-Neuda alongside works by Heinrich Heine and other poets of the period. In 2021, her work was read together with works by Goethe and Nietzsche.

Halpern-Neuda is described in some studies as a spiritualist poet. In 1921, she wrote a letter to Albert Einstein that later gained attention and was cited in numerous studies concerning Einstein's views on spirituality. In the letter she wrote (free translation):

“I grasp your hands and beseech you: Have you formed any belief? Do souls exist…? Do you believe that ‘the spirit is what builds the body’ and that the highest and most important thing is this advancement, this salvation of the soul?”

Einstein replied at length:

Berlin, 5 February 1921

Esteemed Madam,

You did not approach the right man. Only he who has renounced the questions you posed becomes a researcher in the exact sciences… Natural science only deals with physical events, and the spiritual only insofar as it is connected with the physical. Whether this connection is complete we cannot know. But I do believe this on the basis of our incomplete experience of the relations governing here. We have no reason to believe in the spiritual independent of physical reality; and I find such belief—because it signifies a voluntary abstention from scientific apprehension—ugly and unworthy of a strong human being.

It seems to me that the conception of a soul without a body is empty and meaningless. Let us be glad that the division of organic life into individuals is tempered by death and procreation.

In utmost respect, Albert Einstein

Her correspondence with Einstein is preserved in the Einstein Archives.

Neuda was part of the Lebensreform movement, a social movement that developed in Germany and Austria in the late 19th and early 20th centuries, promoting a more natural lifestyle such as vegetarianism, naturopathy, simplicity, physical health, and living in nature.

In 1936, she filed a patent for a health device that allowed control over temperature, air composition, humidity, radiation conditions, and color, intended to simulate natural climatic conditions or new therapeutic combinations. The patent was approved in 1937.

== Personal life ==
She married Adolf Abraham Halpern on 24 October 1909 at the Leopoldstädter Tempel in Vienna.

They had two children: William Ward (born Robert Halpern) (1911–1997) and Lisa Jack (born Lotte Halpern) (1917–1987). Both survived the Holocaust; their daughter emigrated to the United States and their son to England.

According to historical sources, it is difficult to determine precisely Halpern-Neuda's fate during World War II and the Holocaust experienced by Austrian Jews. She apparently fled Vienna around 1940 to Kaunas in Lithuania, then under Russian control, where she received refugee status. With the occupation of Kaunas by the Nazis, she was murdered in the gas chambers at Auschwitz in late 1941.

== Works ==
- Halpern-Neuda, Lili: Erdenstunden, Heller & Cie, 1908
- Halpern-Neuda, Lili: Eingemauert: Dichtungen, Vienna: Anzengruber Verlag, 1919
