= Bouzov Castle =

Castle in Bouzov in the Czech Republic

Coordinates: 49°42′16″N 16°53′23″E

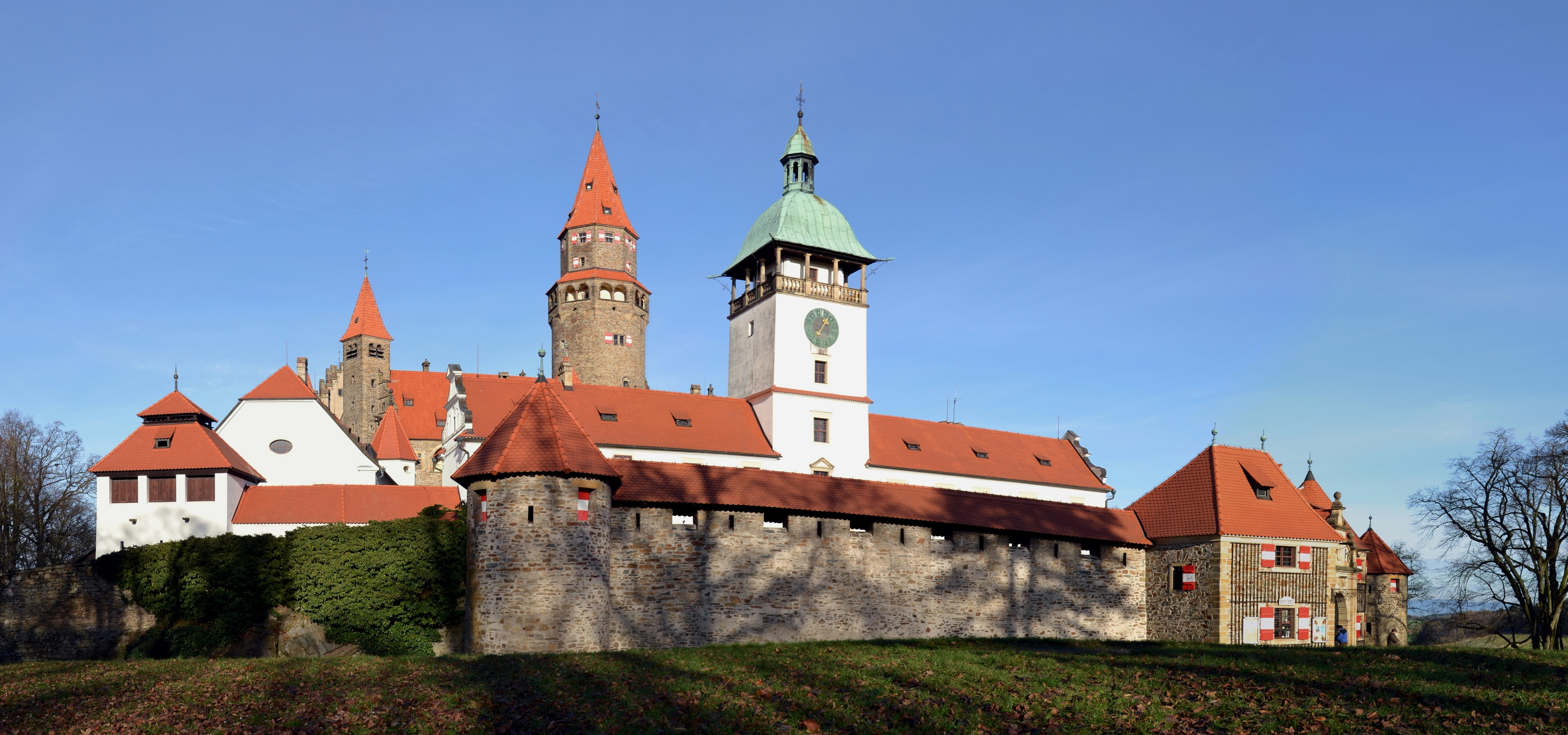
Bouzov Castle as seen from the park

Bouzov Castle (Czech: Hrad Bouzov) is a castle in Bouzov in the Olomouc Region of the Czech Republic. It is located on a hill above the village of Bouzov, about 28 kilometres (17 mi) northwest of Olomouc. It was first mentioned in 1317.

== History ==
=== Owners ===
Bouzov was established in the second half of the 14th century with the purpose to watch over the trade route from Olomouc to Loštice. It was first mentioned in 1317. The minor aristocratic Bůz of Bludovec family were its first recorded owners from 1317 to 1339. The castle also takes its name from the family. Ownership of the castles was then changed, and the Lords of Kunštát were among the most important medieval owners. According to tradition, the Bouzov castle is often connected with name of the most famous member of this noble dynasty, George of Poděbrady was born in Bouzov in 1420 and was crowned Czech King in 1458. His original title was Jiří of Kunštát and Bouzov. In 1558 the castle burned down, and lost much of its majestic quality. In the course of centuries there were several changes of proprietors; the castle was owned by the lords of Vildenberk, Margrave Jobst of Moravia, the Haugwitz and the Podstatzky families, and in 1696 the barony was bought by the grand master of the Teutonic Order, the Rhenish Pfalzgraf Francis Louis of Palatinate-Neuburg.

=== Vildenberks period ===
As various noble families changed possession of Bouzov, in a similar way also its appearance was changed from an early Gothic castle to a Renaissance style. In the time of the lords of Bouzov, the castle played mostly a defensive and guarding role. It probably consisted of a tower and rampart and wooden dwelling houses. The Vildenberks built a stony manor on the western side which was taller than the rampart. Already in the 14th century the castle was significantly widened - a settlement with outhouses was constructed with a ditch and circumvallation, rampart with a 200-foot-high (61 m tall) watchtower and a moat wall built around the castle. During the rule of the Kunštát family, the manor was fortified with a new connected rampart with two bastions, and the moat wall was rebuilt with five round bastions. Later a round gun-bastion was erected and the tallest watchtower was repaired.

=== From the 15th to 19th century ===
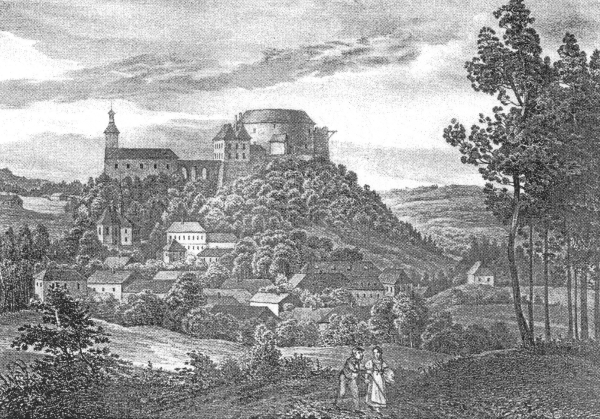
Bouzov at the beginning of the 19th century

In 1408 the castle passed into the hands of Viktorin of Bouzov. In 1499 the Haugwitz family started the construction of a palace on the eastern side and connected the northern and southern dwelling building. In the first half of the 15th century it was converted into a Hussite stronghold, serving as a prison for captured Swedes during the Thirty Years' War. In the second half of the 16th century the castle burned out and remained uninhabited.

About a hundred years later, the reconstruction of the castle began again with the remodeling of the southern wing. At that time the castle had already lost its defensive function and became an utterly dwelling object. With the arrival of the Teutonic Order, during the 18th century the castle also lost this function. Only the building in the outer settlement remained inhabited, and by the end of the 19th century the ruin of the castle became a tourist goal.

=== Habsburgs period ===
The castle gained today's appearance after massive Neo-Gothic reconstruction between 1895 and 1910. The Grand Master of the Order of the Teutonic Knights from 1894 to 1923, Archduke Eugen of Austria, decided to rebuild it in the Romantic, predominantly Neo-Gothic style, according to the plans of the prominent architects of its time Georg von Hauberrisser (1841–1922) of the Munich Polytechnic University; he was the author of Munich and Saarbrücken's town halls, and also very influential as builder of churches like the St. Paul's church in Munich. The alterations were carried out with the intention of making part of the castle open to the public. Bouzov was fitted with modern furnishings and equipment, including running water and central heating. The order was abolished in 1939 and the castle was confiscated by the fascists, occupied and looted by the Nazis during World War II. The castle was acquired by the Chief of the Gestapo R. Himmler, who forced the Strahov Monastery to sell it to him for one million crowns, as a present to A. Hitler. After 1989 the Order of Teutonic Knights expressed an interest in the castle, but their request to have it returned to them has so far been rejected.

== Description ==
An eight-storey watchtower, 58 metres (190 ft) high, dominates the complex. The buildings are grouped around it in the form of a horseshoe, and the castle is enhanced by a number of towers, and among other things, bastions, battlements, oriel windows and loopholes. The two long bridges, ending with a short drawbridge, span the deep dry moat around the castle. The knights' hall, armoury, which is in one of the few original rooms with preserved Gothic vaulting, bedrooms of the knights and a neo-Gothic chapel with its Gothic altar and tombs occupy the central part of the castle. The valuable furniture comes from the private collection of Eugen von Habsburg and the collection of the Order of the Teutonic Knights.

Since 1999, the castle has been protected as a national cultural monument.

== In popular culture ==
The castle has been used in a number of film productions lately, including Arabela, Fantaghirò, and Before the Fall.
