= Fanny Neuda =

German-language Jewish writer

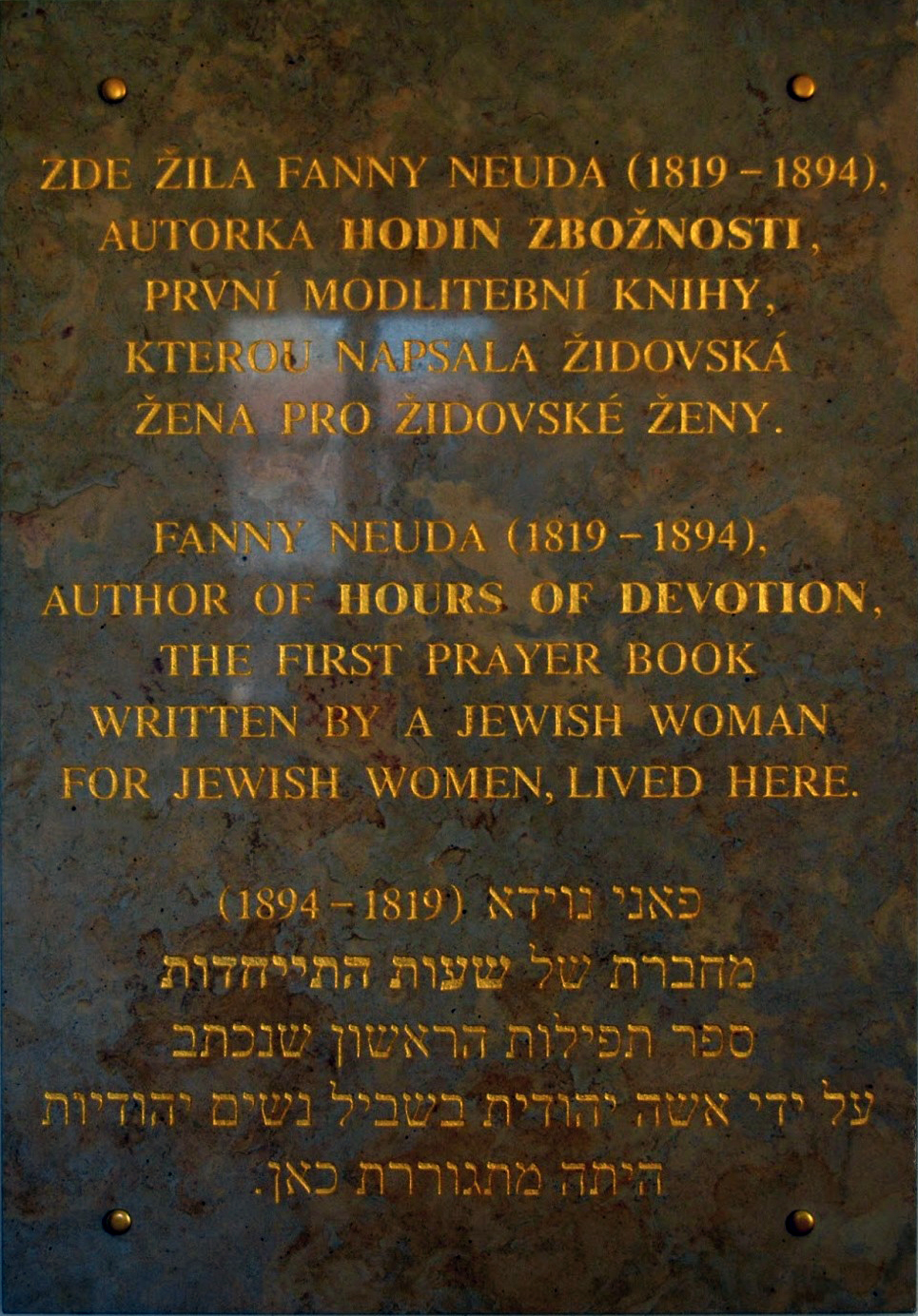
Memorial plaque at the Loštice Synagogue honoring Fanny Neuda

Fanny Neuda (née Schmiedl, 6 March 1819 in Lomnice – 6 April 1894 in Merano) was a German-language Jewish writer best known for her popular collection of prayers, Stunden der Andacht (1855).

After marrying Abraham Neuda (1812–1854), she moved to Loštice, where her husband served as rabbi. After Abraham Neuda's died in 1854, her book of prayers became widely published.

== Early life ==
Fanny Neuda was born to the family of Rabbi Yehudah Schmiedl (1776–1855). Her maternal grandfather, Rabbi Moshe HaKohen Karpeles (1765–1837), and his wife, Titl (née Grünbaum) Karpeles, raised three sons and a daughter, Nechoma Karpeles, Fanny's mother. Nechoma married Rabbi Yehudah Schmiedl, Fanny's father. By the time Fanny was two years old, the family had moved to nearby Prostějov, home to her grandfather Moshe, a center of Talmudic study and the growing Jewish Enlightenment. It was there that Fanny's brother Adolf (1821–1913) was born. Like his father, grandfather, and uncles before him, Adolf became a rabbi, eventually assuming a prominent rabbinical post in Vienna.

After marrying Rabbi Abraham Neuda sometime in the 1830s, the couple settled in Loštice, Abraham's hometown in eastern Moravia. When Abraham's father, Aaron Neuda, the rabbi of Loštice, died in 1834, he got selected by the Jewish community of Loštice to succeed him. His election was opposed, however, by the chief rabbi of Moravia, Nehemiah Trebitsch. While Abraham eventually prevailed, he died in 1854, aged forty-two. Fanny remained in Loštice with her sons until 1857 when she moved to Brno.

In 1880, Fanny Neuda joined her brother Adolf in Austria, who was then serving as a rabbi in Vienna. At the age of 75, she died on 16 April 1894 while in the spa town of Merano, modern-day Italy.

=== Her Family ===
Neuda was married to Rabbi Abraham Neuda. They had three sons: Moritz Neuda (1842-1917), a journalist in Neue Freie Presse, Julius Neuda (1845-1859), and Gotthold Neuda (1846-1918) who was the Austro-Hungarian commercial attaché at the Austrian consulate in Port-au-Prince, Haiti.

Her granddaughter Lili Halpern-Neuda, daughter of her son Moritz, was an Austrian poet who died at the holocaust.

== Writing ==
Fanny Neuda, like many learned Jewish women, likely served as firzogerin of the weibershul (women's gallery) in her husband's Loštice synagogue, a role suited to the collection and composition of prayers read in the vernacular of the women's congregants. Following the death of her husband, Fanny Neuda published a book of these prayers for women. Stunden der Andacht: Ein Gebet- und Erbauungsbuch für Israels Frauen und Jungfrauen zur öffentlichen und häuslichen Andacht (Hours of Devotion: Book of Prayer and Edification for Jewish Wives and Young Women) was the first collection of Jewish prayers known to have been written by a woman for women, and the first collection of women's teḥinot (supplicatory prayers) to be offered in German rather than Yiddish. Published in Prague in 1855, Stunden der Andacht became a bestseller, and it was reprinted more than two dozen times between 1855 and 1918. In 1866, Rabbi Moritz Mayer published his abridged English translation, Hours of Devotion: A Book of Prayers and Meditations (1866), in New York. Stunden der Andacht was re-printed in more than 30 editions. A revised version accounting for the special conditions existing in Nazi Germany was prepared by Martha Wertheimer and titled Alle Tage deines Leben: Ein Buch für jüdische Frauen (All the Days of Your Life: A Book for Jewish Women; 1935). The latest printing was issued in Basel, Switzerland, in 1968. In 2013, the Open Siddur Project completed work transcribing a digital edition of German Wikisource.

Neuda also wrote stories about the domestic life of Jews of Bohemia and Moravia. Two of her other books appeared in Prague: Noami: Erzählungen aus Davids Wanderleben (Noami: Tales from David's Life of Wandering; 1864) and Jugend-Erzählungen aus dem israelitischen Familienleben (Tales of Jewish Family Life for Youngsters; 1876).

== Honours ==
In 2015, a plaque honoring her was unveiled in Loštice.

== See also ==
- Stunden der Andacht: Ein Gebet- und Erbauungsbuch für Israels Frauen und Jungfrauen zur öffentlichen und häuslichen Andacht at German Wikisource.
- Stunden der Andacht digital edition at the Open Siddur Project.
- Hours of Devotion translated by Rabbi Moritz Mayer with additional prayers, transcribed at the Open Siddur Project.
