= Georg von Hauberrisser =

German-Austrian architect (1841–1922)

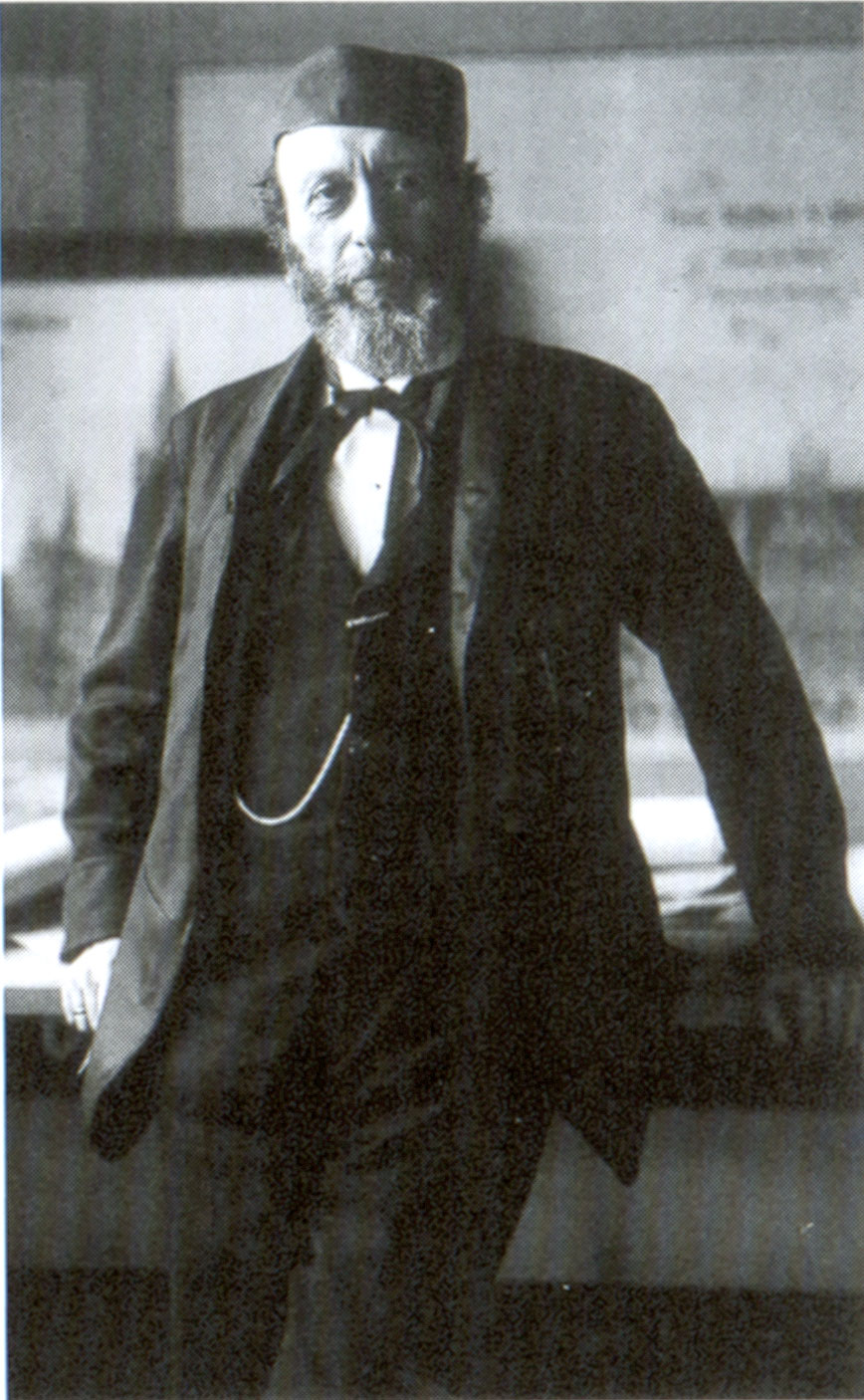
- Photograph of Georg von Hauberrisser (around 1900)
- Born: 19 March 1841; Graz
- Died: 17 May 1922 (aged 81); Munich
- Other names: Hauberrisser, Georg Joseph Ritter von (full name); Hauberrisser, Georg; Hauberrisser, Georg Joseph
- Occupation: Architect

Georg von Hauberrisser (19 March 1841 in Graz – 17 May 1922 in Munich) was a German-Austrian architect.

== Biography ==
Hauberrisser’s father Georg Hauberrisser the Elder (1791–1875) was born in Erbach in Rheingau and worked as a builder. He moved to Graz in 1811. In 1838 he married Juliane, née Röckenzaun (1815–1889), who was his third (and last) spouse and daughter of a master locksmith from Mureck. Georg the Younger was their eldest child. He had one brother Karl who died in early childhood and one sister, Antonia (1846-1924).

After graduating from school and several summer jobs as a builder, Georg Hauberrisser the Younger intended to become an architect and started his studies at the Graz Polytechnic. In 1862 he moved to Munich to study architecture at the Polytechnic and professor Gottfried von Neureuther and for one year at the Academy of Fine Arts at Georg Friedrich Ziebland and Ludwig Lange. In 1863, he continued his studies at the Bauakademie in Berlin at Johann Heinrich Strack and Karl Bötticher. In 1864 he moved to Vienna to study at the Academy of Fine Arts at Friedrich von Schmidt, who influenced him regarding Gothic Revival architecture.

In 1866, Hauberrisser started working as an architect in Munich. Only 25 years old, he planned his most famous building, the New Town Hall (Munich). Construction was commissioned to Hauberrisser as well and started in 1867. Georg von Hauberrisser is also well-known for the New Town Hall, Wiesbaden, the Herz-Jesu-Kirche in Hauberrisser’s hometown Graz representing Austria’s finest building in gothic revival style, and St. Paul's Church in Munich. Other important projects were the rebuilding of Moravian Bouzov Castle belonging to the Teutonic Order and the townhalls of Kaufbeuren and St. Johann an der Saar, part of today’s Saarbrücken.

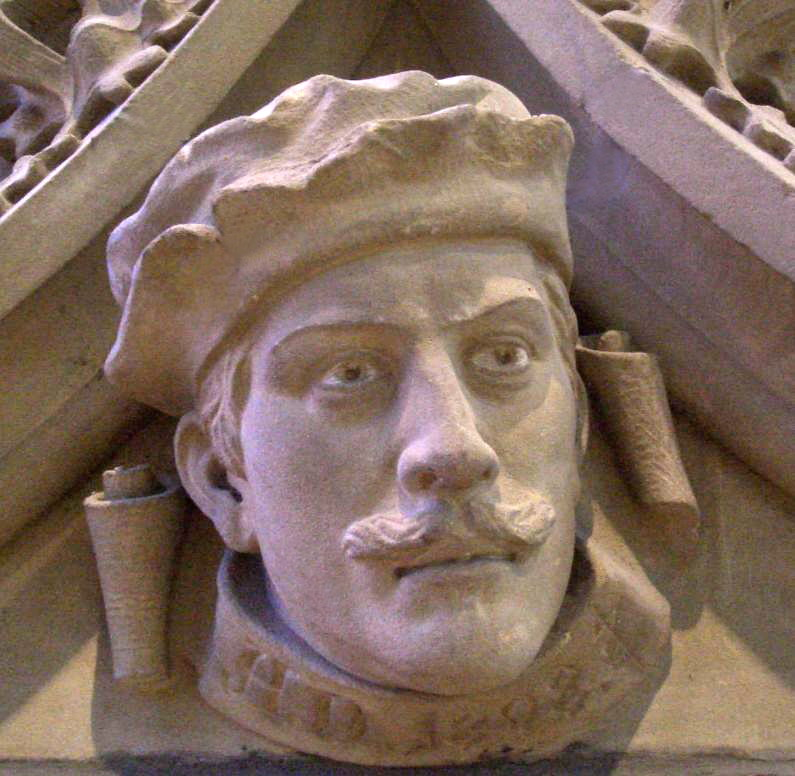
Bust of Georg Hauberrisser at St. Paul in Munich

Hauberrisser married Maria, née Wessely, on 1 January 1868 in Graz. They had eight children (four boys and four girls) of whom six reached adulthood, among them chemist Georg Hauberrisser (1869–1925), architect Heinrich Hauberrisser (1872–1945) who inherited his father’s studio and Edwin Hauberrisser (1882–1964) who was professor for dental medicine in Göttingen.

In 1874, Hauberrisser became a citizen of Bavaria and got the right of residence in Munich. In 1893 he was accepted into the Arts Class of the Bavarian Maximilian Order for Science and Art. In 1901, prince regent Luitpold ennobled Georg Hauberrisser by awarding him the Order of Merit of the Bavarian Crown in the grade of a Knight which entitled him to be called Ritter von Hauberrisser. Georg von Hauberrisser died aged 81 suffering from heart disease. His tomb is located at Alter Südfriedhof in Munich.

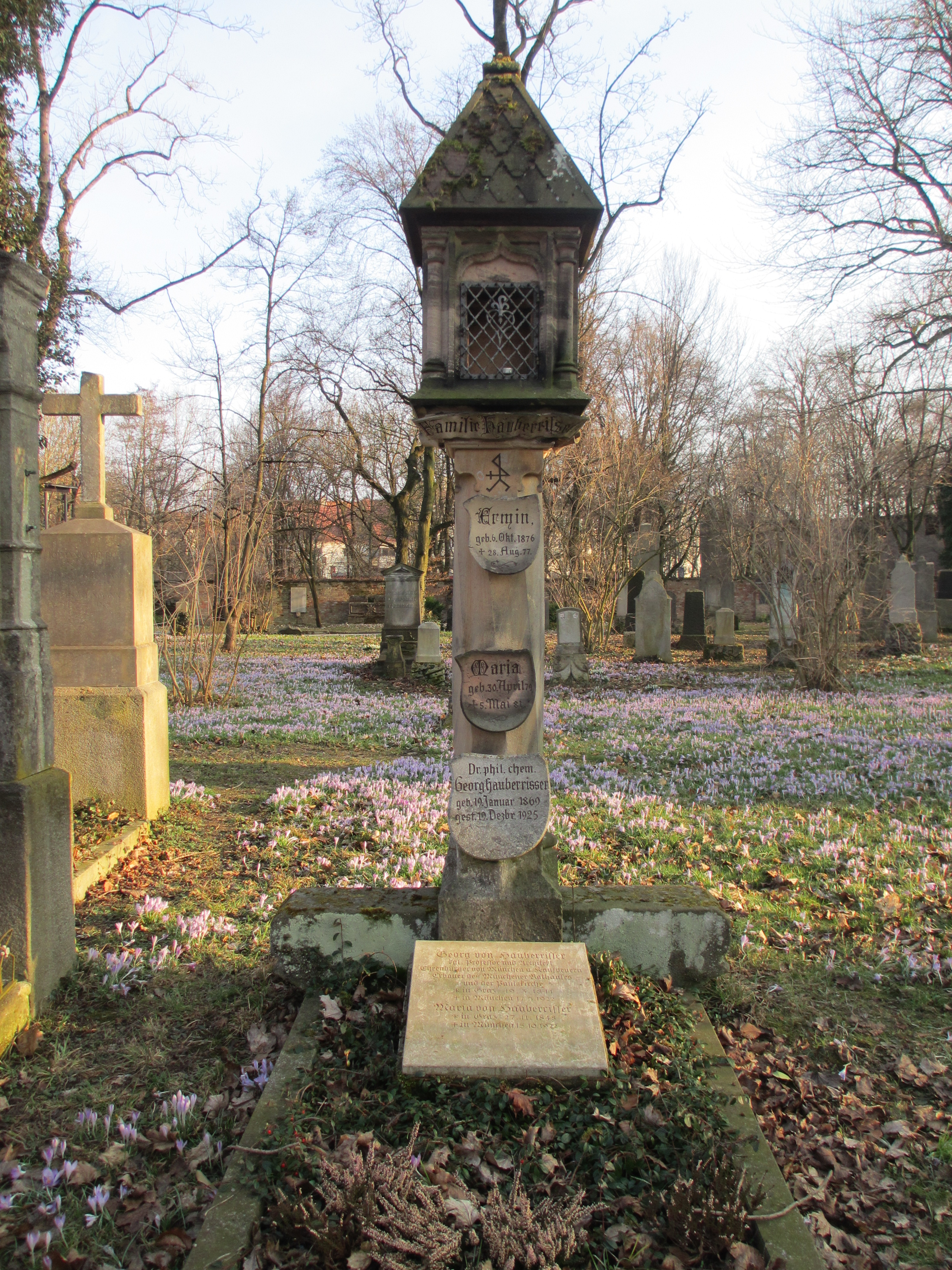
Tomb of Georg von Hauberrisser at Alter Südfriedhof in Munich

== Honours ==
- Honorary member of the Academy of Fine Arts Munich (1875)
- Königlicher Professor (Royal Professor) at the Academy of Fine Arts Munich (1876)
- Order of the Iron Crown (Austria) 3rd class
- Order of the Crown (Prussia) 3rd class
- Württemberg Order of the Crown, Honorary Cross (1905)
- Order of Saint Michael (Bavaria), Cross of Knighthood of the Order of Merit 1st class (1910)
- Honorary doctorate of Graz University of Technology (1911)
- Honorary citizen of Munich (1921)

== Buildings ==
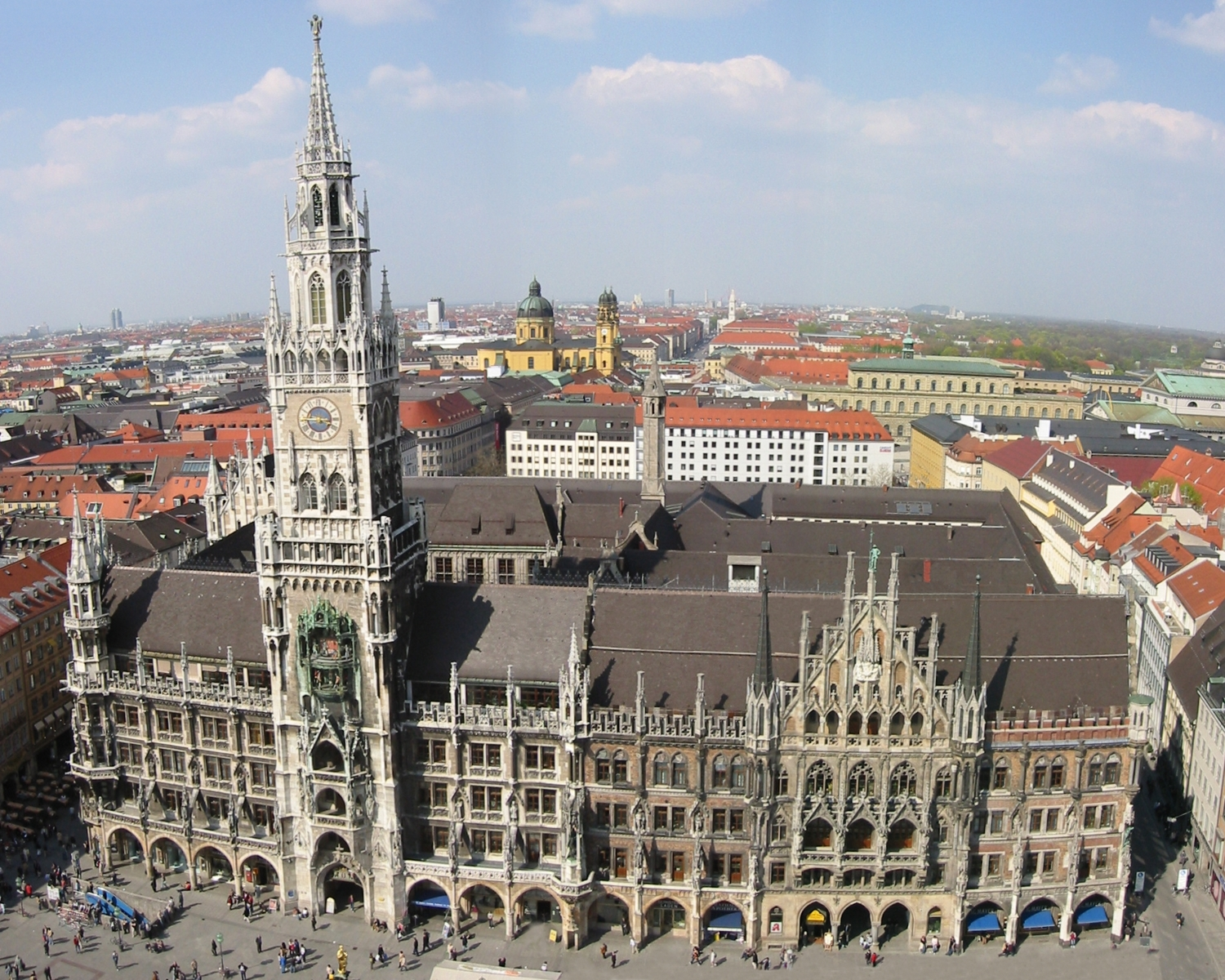
New Town Hall (Munich)

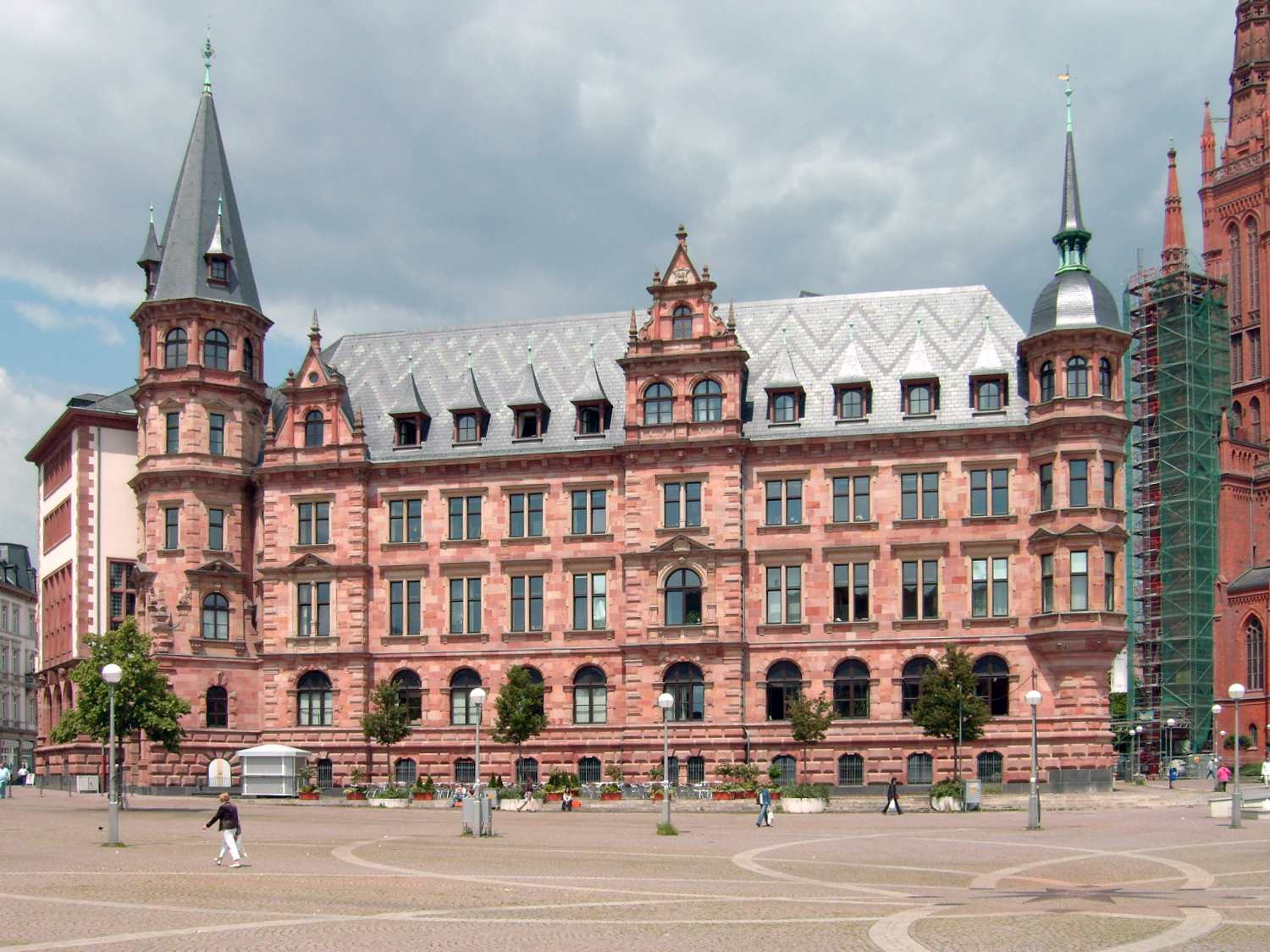
New Town Hall, Wiesbaden

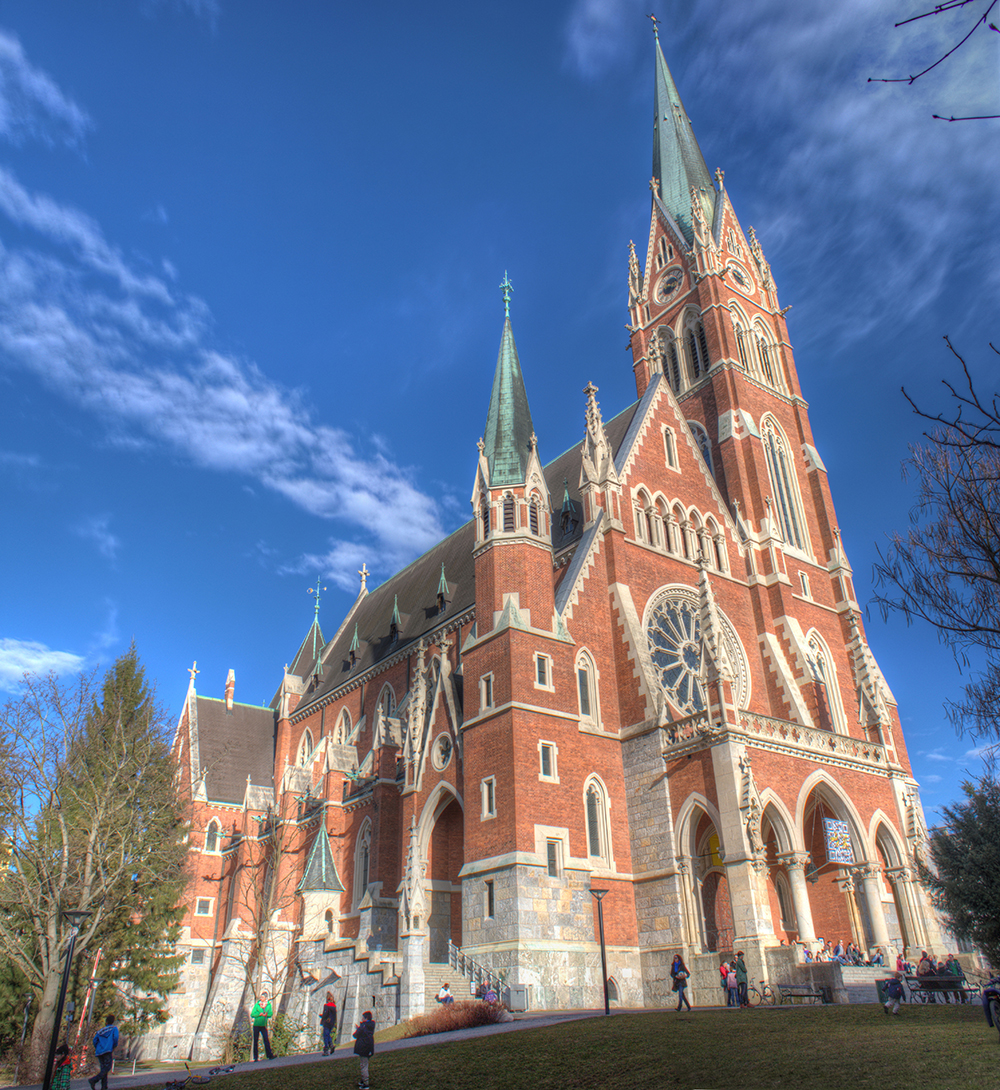
Herz-Jesu-Kirche, Graz

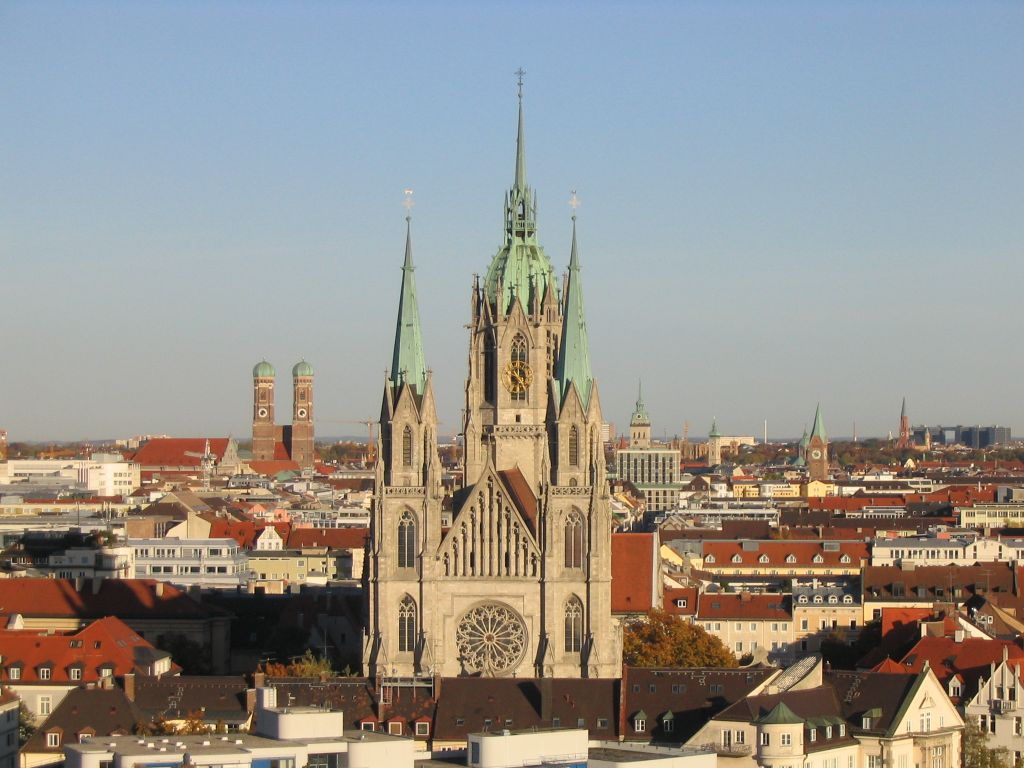
St. Paul's Church, Munich

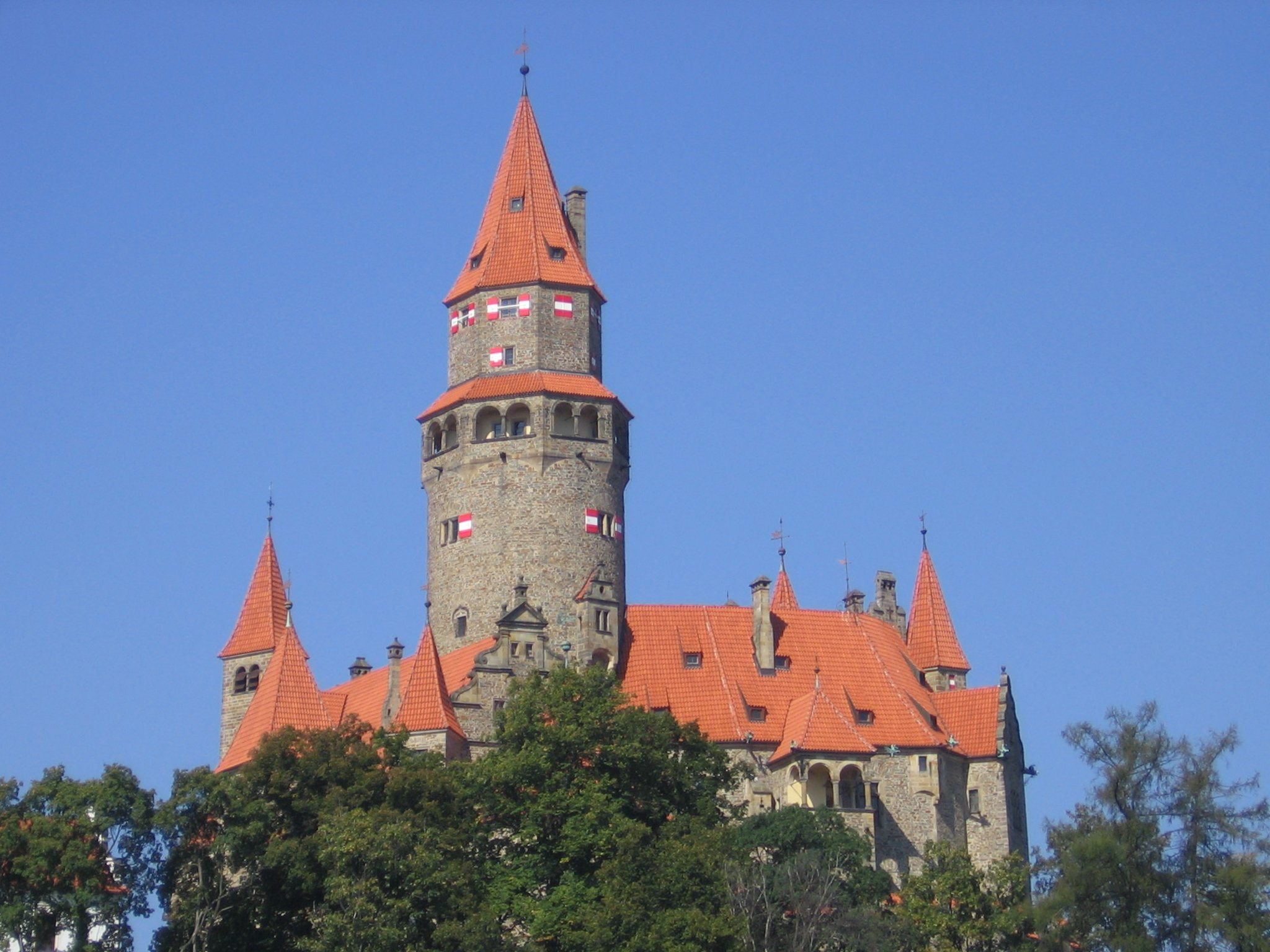
Bouzov Castle

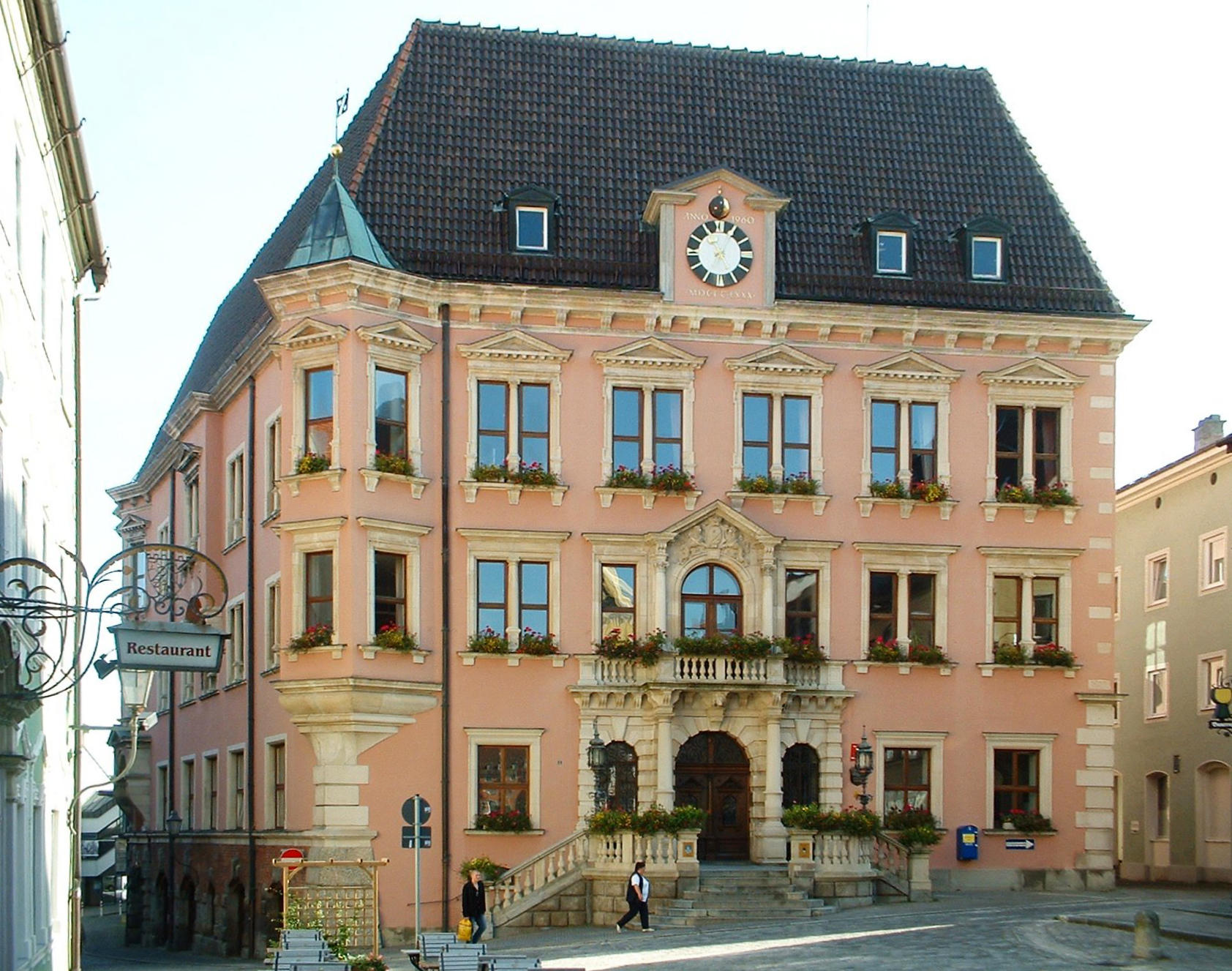
Townhall Kaufbeuren

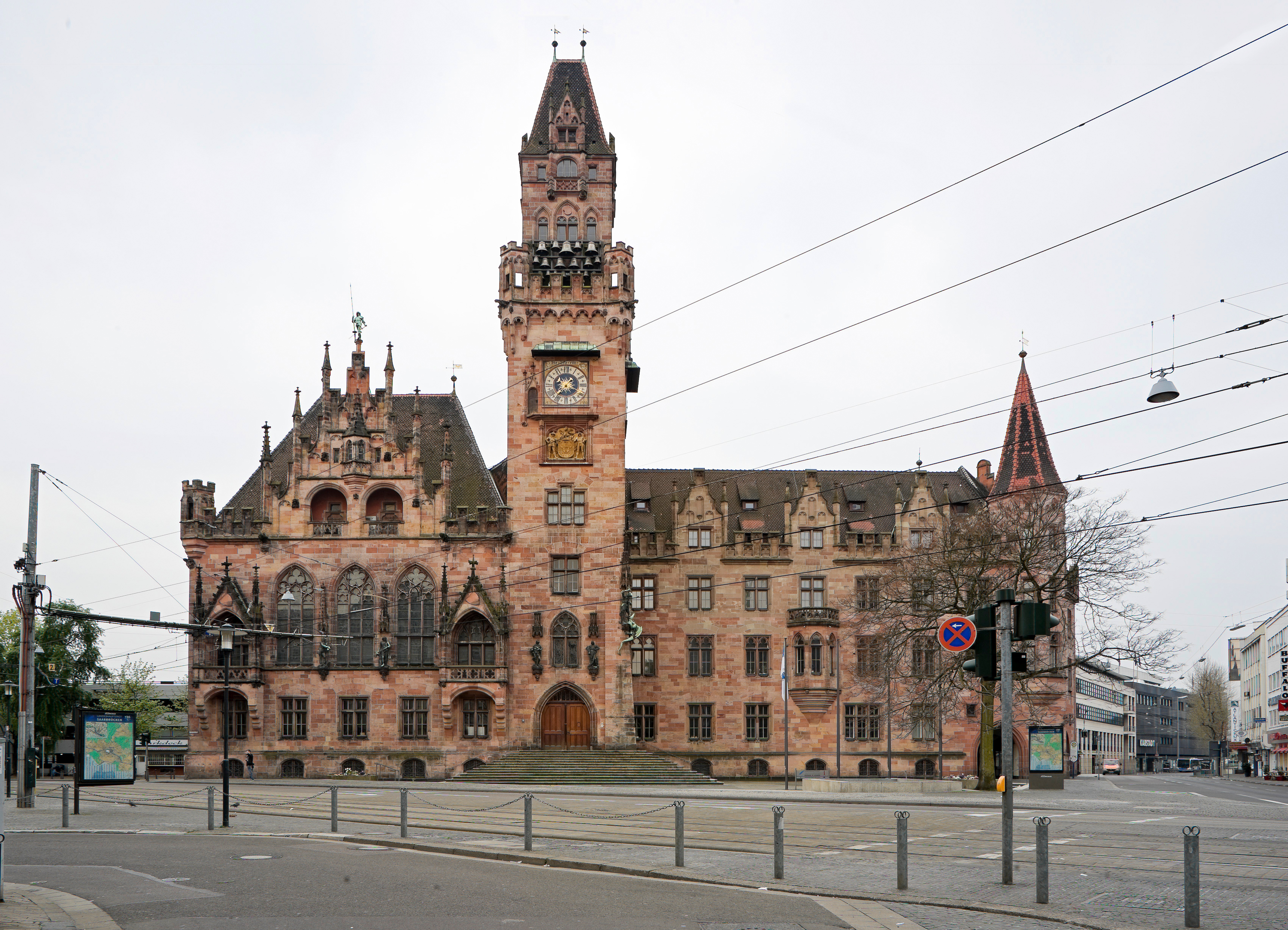
Townhall Saarbrücken

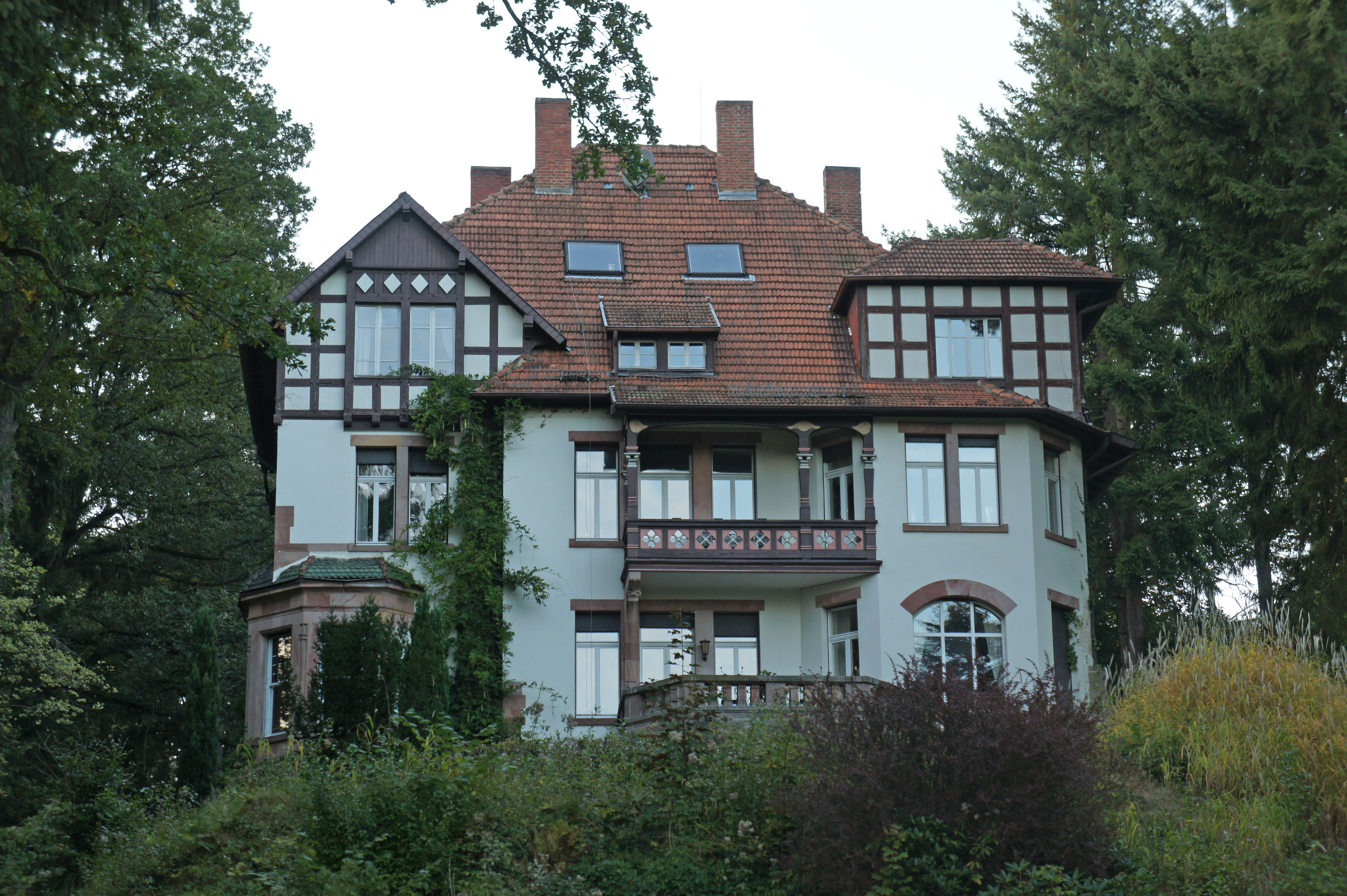
Gut Junkerwald am Weiher in Niederwürzbach

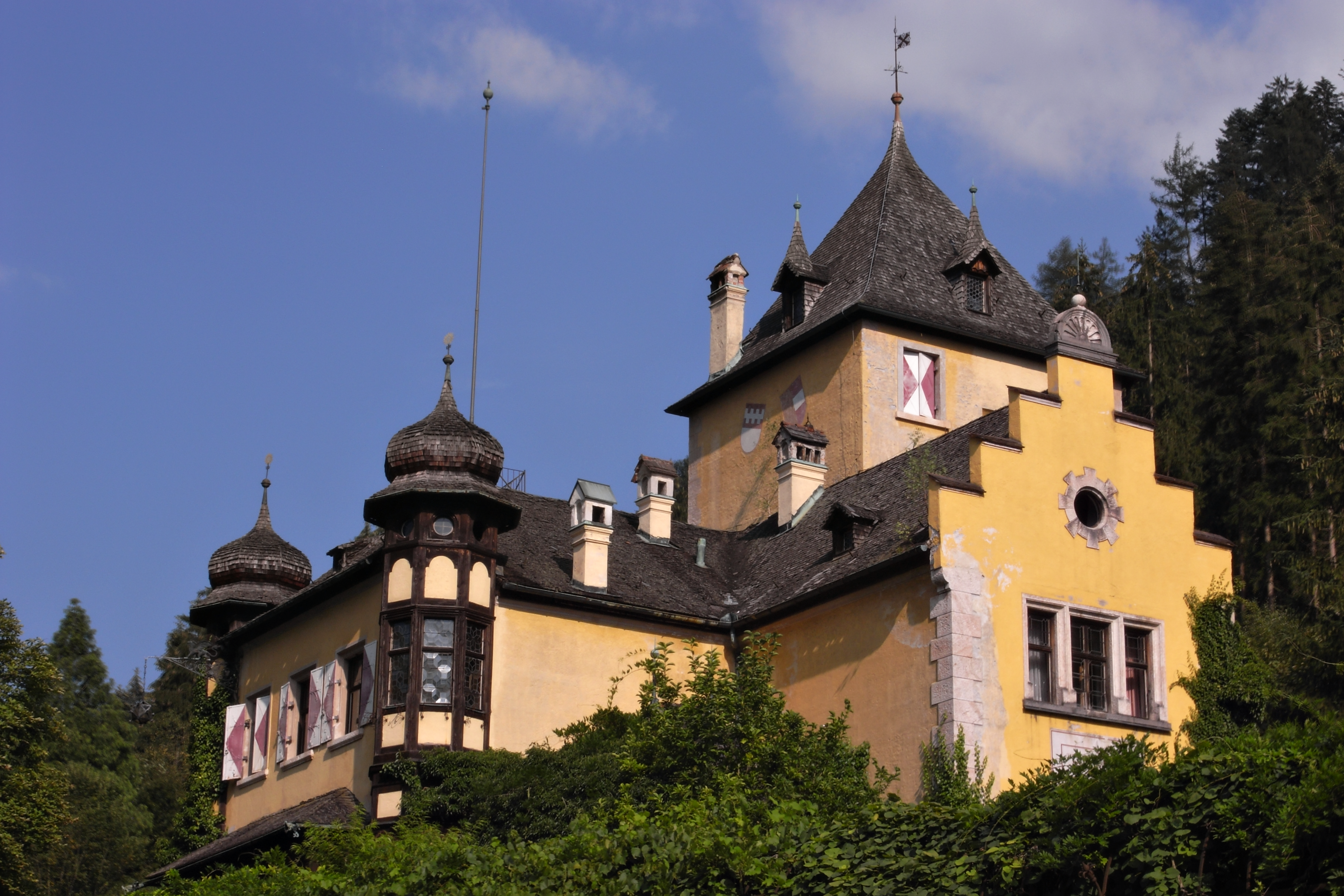
Castle Neumatzen (Lipperheide) in Münster, Tyrol
