= Martha Wertheimer =

German journalist and rescuer of Jewish children

- Born: 22 October 1890; Frankfurt, German Empire
- Died: June 1942 (aged 51); Sobibor extermination camp, German-occupied Poland
- Other name: Martha Werth
- Education: Frankfurt University
- Occupations: Journalist, writer and rescuer
- Known for: Rescuing Jews from the Gestapo
- Parents: Juda Julius Wertheimer (father); Johanna Tannenbaum (mother)

Martha Wertheimer (22 October 1890 – June 1942) was a German journalist, writer and rescuer who came from a Jewish family. Before World War II, she oversaw the operation of the Kindertransport from south and southwest Germany. She died in the Holocaust.

== Life and work ==
Martha Wertheimer was born into a middle-class family in Frankfurt, Germany. With her sister Lydia, they were the daughters of Juda Julius Wertheimer and Johanna, née Tannenbaum. In 1911 Martha was enrolled at the Academy for Social and Commercial Sciences (in 1914 it became Frankfurt University). She completed her studies in history, philosophy and English philology. In 1919, she became only the fourth woman to receive a doctorate from the university with her dissertation, The theoretical content of the correspondence between Frederick the Great and Voltaire.

From 1919, she worked as an editor for the liberal newspaper, Offenbacher Zeitung; she was politically committed to women's suffrage and occasionally worked on the radio. During this time she often used the pseudonym "Martha Werth" for journalistic work. Wertheimer was interested in many things and had a large circle of acquaintances and friends. In the 1920s she went on trips abroad, mostly with her sister Lydia (1884–1942), which she recorded in sketches for her newspaper. During this time she also worked as a community college lecturer and appeared as a speaker at public events.

=== Nazi occupation ===
In connection with the Nazi control of power in Frankfurt and the expulsion of Jews from professional positions, she was fired from the Offenbacher Zeitung in 1933. She joined the editorial team of the Israelitisches Familienblatt, where she wrote about religious questions, Jewish self-image and, especially, the training of young people and young adults who wanted to emigrate to Palestine.

After the Jewish athletes were excluded from all German teams for the 1936 Olympic Games in Berlin, Wertheimer, an enthusiastic foil fencer and long-distance swimmer, together with two other Jewish athletes, Paul Yogi Mayer and Siddy Goldschmidt, wrote a documentary which honored the achievements of Jewish athletes.

In addition to her books, there were other publications, a drama Channah and the libretto for the one-act opera Riccio. The work has not yet been found. The author herself rated her journalistic work for the Israelitisches Familienblatt (years 1936–1938) as “quite good.” She won a prize for "Channa."

In 1936 Martha and her sister Lydia, who lived with her permanently, were expelled from their shared apartment. Martha went to Berlin, where she took over the editing of her magazine, got involved in the Kulturbund Deutscher Juden, but above all in youth work. She took on functions in the Jewish sports and youth organization Makkabi Germany and helped prepare for the settlement in Palestine (Hachshara training). She urged people to "pack up and leave before it's too late. And if they wouldn't or couldn't go, they should at least let their children go." At the end of 1937, Wertheimer traveled to Palestine for several weeks, but returned to her duties in Germany. In 1938 she moved back to Frankfurt to live with her sister and toured southern Germany as a propagandist for the Zionist Association for Germany. Later she took over the management of Jewish child welfare as director of children's affairs.

=== Child rescues ===
In 1938–1939, she "played a central role" in organizing transportation for endangered Jewish children from south and southwest Germany and sending them to countries such as the Netherlands and England, usually alone, without their parents, siblings or friends. Called Kindertransport, Wertheimer accompanied several trips to England to help get the German refugee children settled there, but she always returned to Germany.

When the transports were halted because of the start of World War II, Wertheimer ran a soup kitchen as well as eight homes for elderly Jews in Germany.

=== Last days ===
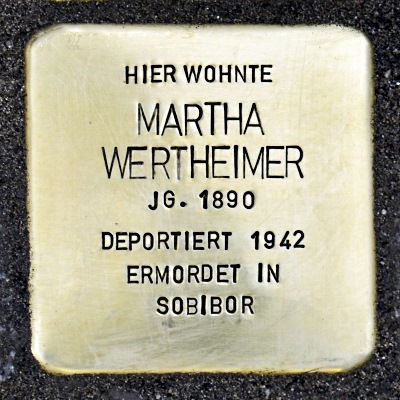
Stolperstein in memory of Martha Wertheimer in front of her house at Unter den Kastanien 1 in Sachsenhausen, "from which Martha and Lydia were evicted in 1935 in favor of Aryan tenants."

After Lydia's passport was revoked, Martha decided to remain in Germany with her. She became more involved in religious life and took on functions that were otherwise reserved for rabbis. After interrogations and temporary arrests, the sisters made another attempt to emigrate in 1940, but there were no more countries open to them. Despite a serious leg injury from a bomb that exploded near her apartment, Martha continued to take on educational tasks and founded an apprentice workshop for Jews.

At the end of 1941, the sisters were forced to move to a house in the ghetto. In 1942, the Gestapo forced Martha to help organize the deportations of Jews "to the east." She and her sister were among the approximately 1,400 Frankfurt Jews who were deported, probably to the Sobibor extermination camp, on the third transport on 11 June 1942. None of the passengers returned.

== Selected works ==
- On the influence of Frederick the Great on Voltaire, according to the state-theoretical content of their correspondence (dissertation Frankfurt am Main 1917)
- (under the pseudonym Martha Werth) Frauenart and physical exercise (Göttingen, 1921)
- Training as a fencer (Ludwigsburg 1923)
- (under the pseudonym Hal G. Roger) Machine F 136 (Berlin 1933)
- Machine F 136 (2nd edition Berlin 2013) pdf ISBN 978-3-923211-28-9
- All the days of your life. A book for Jewish women (Frankfurt am Main 1935)
- Fanny Neuda: hours of devotion. Reviewed and worked through by Martha Wertheimer (Frankfurt am Main 1936; new edition: Basel 1968)
- The Jewish Sports Book (together with Siddy Goldschmidt and Paul Yogi Mayer) (Berlin 1937)
- Service on the Heights (Berlin 1937), republished under the title Decision and Reversal (Leipzig 2010) pdf ISBN 978-3-923211-79-1
- The great dark calm has come into me. Letters to Siegfried Guggenheim in New York 1939–1941 (Ed. Fritz Bauer Institute; Frankfurt am Main 2nd expanded edition 1996)
