= Nahum Trebitsch =

Czech rabbi (1779–1842)

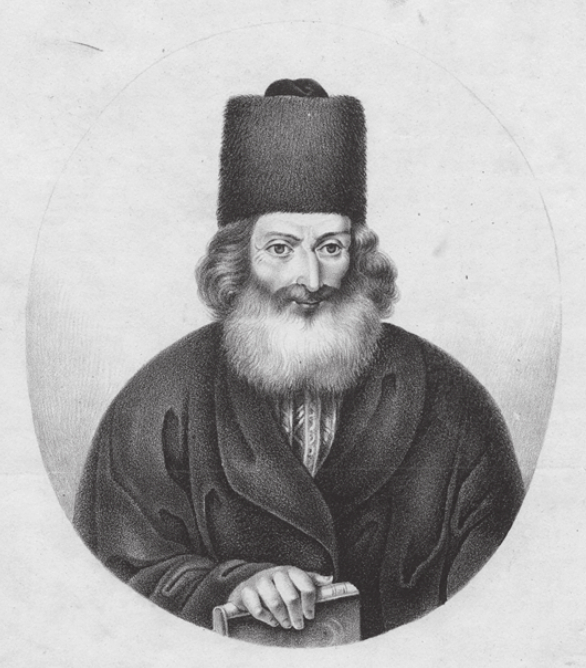

Personal life
- Born: 14 August 1779 Prague
- Died: 4 July 1842 (aged 62) Prague

Religious life
- Religion: Judaism

Menahem Nahum Trebitsch (Hebrew: מנחם נחום טרייביטש, German: Nehemias Trebitsch; August 14, 1779, Prague – July 4, 1842, Prague) was a Czech rabbi.

== Biography ==
He was a son of Selig Trebitsch, ḥazzan at the Old New Synagogue, and he received a thorough Talmudical training at the yeshiva of Jacob Günsberg. Upon the recommendation of the Landesrabbiner Mordecai Benet, Trebitsch became rabbi of Prostějov in 1826.

On May 13, 1832, the government confirmed the election of Trebitsch as Landesrabbiner of Moravia, in succession to Mordecai Benet, and granted him a salary of 600 florins; he was the last Moravian "Landesrabbiner" of the old school. In September 1833, the provincial government issued a decree conferring upon the chief rabbi the power of proposing candidates for the various rabbinates of the province, and of making an appointment when the congregation failed to inform him of a vacancy or rejected the candidate proposed by the "Landesrabbiner". This decree, for which Trebitsch was declared by his opponents to be responsible, brought him into conflict with the congregations of Jevíčko, Hranice na Moravě, Prostějov, and Loštice; and five years later (May 23, 1838) another decree canceled the chief rabbi's privilege of proposing candidates. Abraham Neuda, rabbi of Loštice, whom Trebitsch refused to confirm on account of liberal tendencies, was reinstated after having passed a successful examination before a committee of which Trebitsch was a member. This defeat, and the censure of the government for his opposition to the use of the German language among the Jews greatly affected Trebitsch, who died while on a journey to Karlovy Vary.

== Literary works ==
- Shelom Yerushalayim, glosses on Seder Mo'ed of the Jerusalem Talmud, with the text and David Fränkel's commentary (Vienna, 1821);
- Ḳobeẓ 'al Yad, notes on Maimonides' Yad ha-Ḥazaḳah, part i., with text (ib. 1835).
