= Olomoucké tvarůžky =

Czech cheese dish

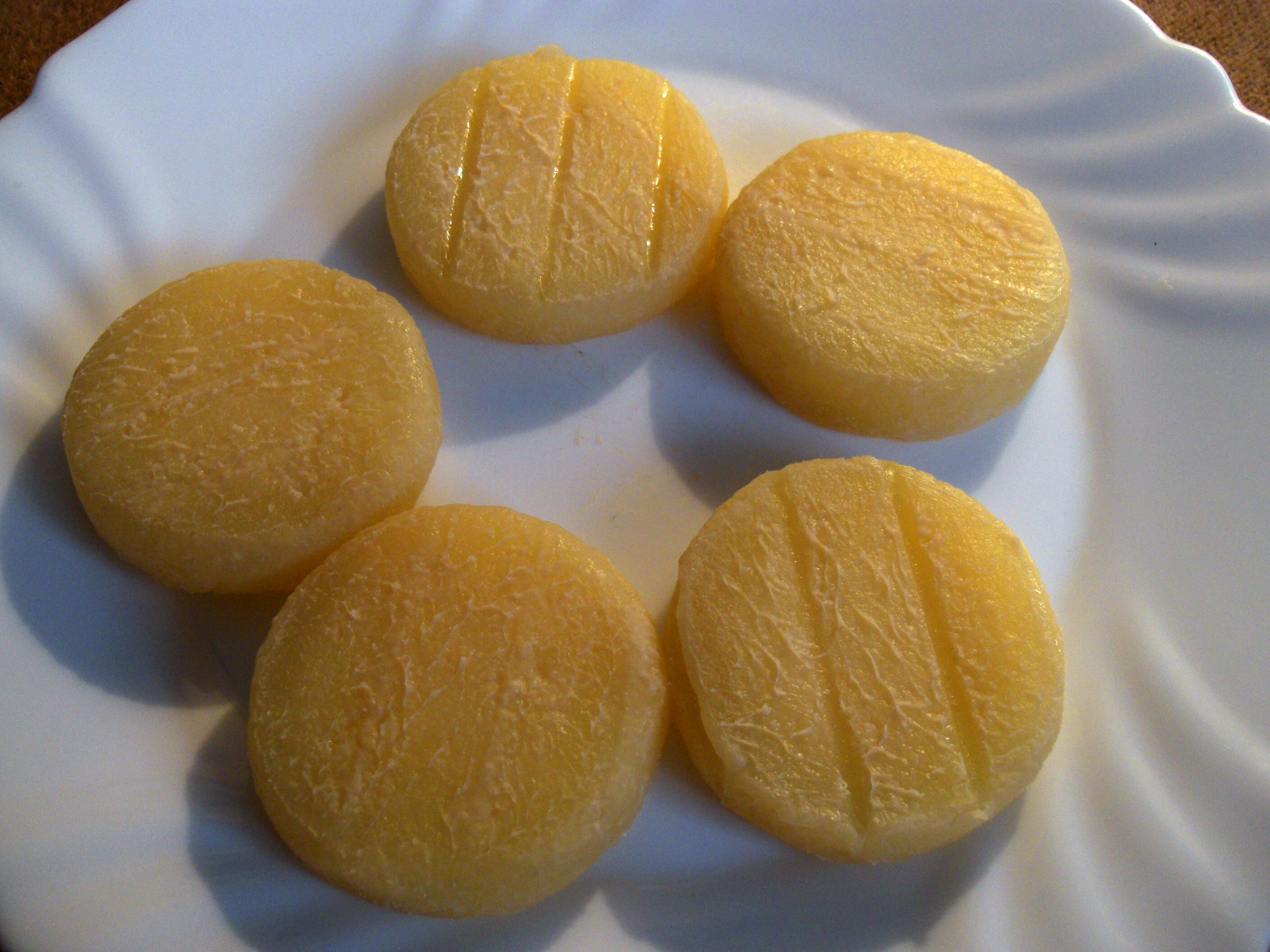
- Other names: Olomoucké syrečky
- Country of origin: Czech Republic
- Region: Olomouc Region (Haná)
- Town: Loštice
- Source of milk: Cows
- Pasteurised: yes
- Fat content: 0.5%
- Weight: 20–30 g per piece
- Certification: PGI
- Named after: Olomouc

Nutritional value per
- Energy: 541 kJ (129 kcal)
- Carbohydrates: 2.6 g
- Sugars: 2.6 g
- Fat: <0.5 g
- Saturated: 0.2 g
- Protein: 28 g
- Other constituents: Quantity
- dry matter: 33 g
- salt: 5 g
- ^{†}Percentages estimated using US recommendations for adults.

Olomoucké tvarůžky ([ˈolomoutskɛː ˈtvaruːʃkɪ]), also known as olomoucké syrečky (Czech pronunciation: [ˈolomoutskɛː ˈsɪrɛtʃkɪ]) or tvargle (from its German name Olmützer Quargel), English: Olomouc cheese, Olomouc curd cheese) is a ripened soft cheese made in Loštice, Olomouc Region, Czech Republic. The cheese is very easy to recognize by its strong scent, distinctive pungent taste and yellowish colour. It is named after the city of Olomouc where it was originally sold.

== Production ==
The Olomoucké tvarůžky is not made directly from milk, but from low-fat quark (tvaroh), hence its name, which literally means "little quarks". The producer of Olomoucké tvarůžky does not produce its own quark, but purchases quark from other dairies. It is made using proprietary dairy cultures, the exact composition of which is not publicly disclosed. With a fat content of only about 0.5%, the cheese is exceptionally low in fat compared with most other cheeses.

== History ==
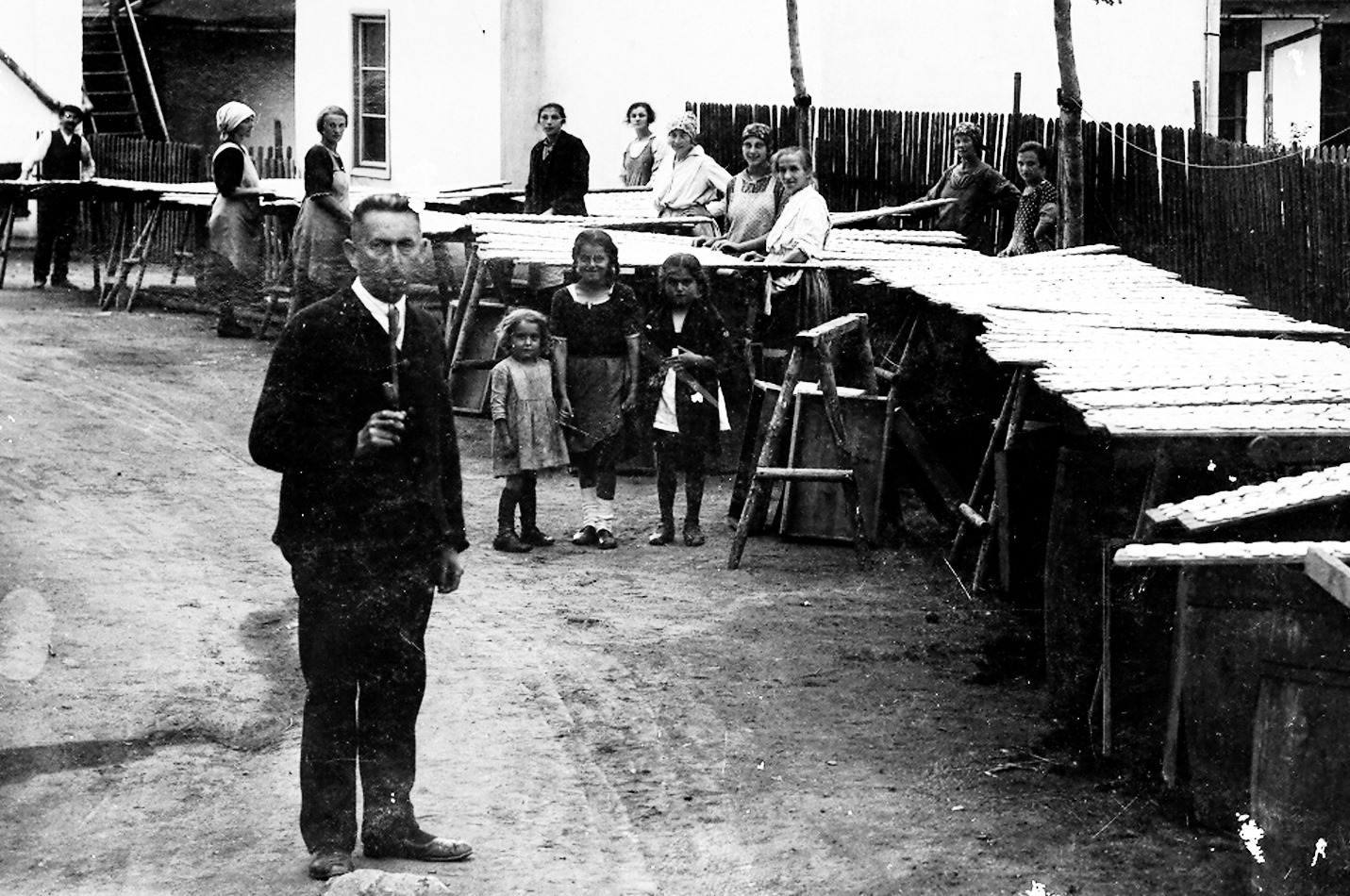
Dairy owner Emil Langer with his daughters and employees. In the back are tables for sun drying of the cheese.

The first written mention of this cheese is from 1452. In 1583, the name tvarůžky appeared for the first time.

Until the 19th century, Olomoucké tvarůžky was produced in the villages surrounding Olomouc, and was generally regarded as a peasant food. It was at this time that the cheese began to be referred to as Olomouc curd cheese. The A. W. Company has been making this cheese since 1876.

In the first decades of the 20th century there were still several dairies in Loštice that produced the cheese. Until the Holocaust some belonged to Jewish families: Langer, Eckstein, Klein and Wischnitzer.

Since 2010, 'Olomoucké tvarůžky' has been registered as a Protected Geographical Indication by the European Union.

In 2016, a shop in Loštice began producing a variety of ice cream based on the cheese.

Olomoucké tvarůžky has long been a popular beer snack and a staple of Czech beer culture. Since the late 2010s, however, it has also gained popularity among fitness enthusiasts due to its high protein content and exceptionally low fat content.

== Tourism ==
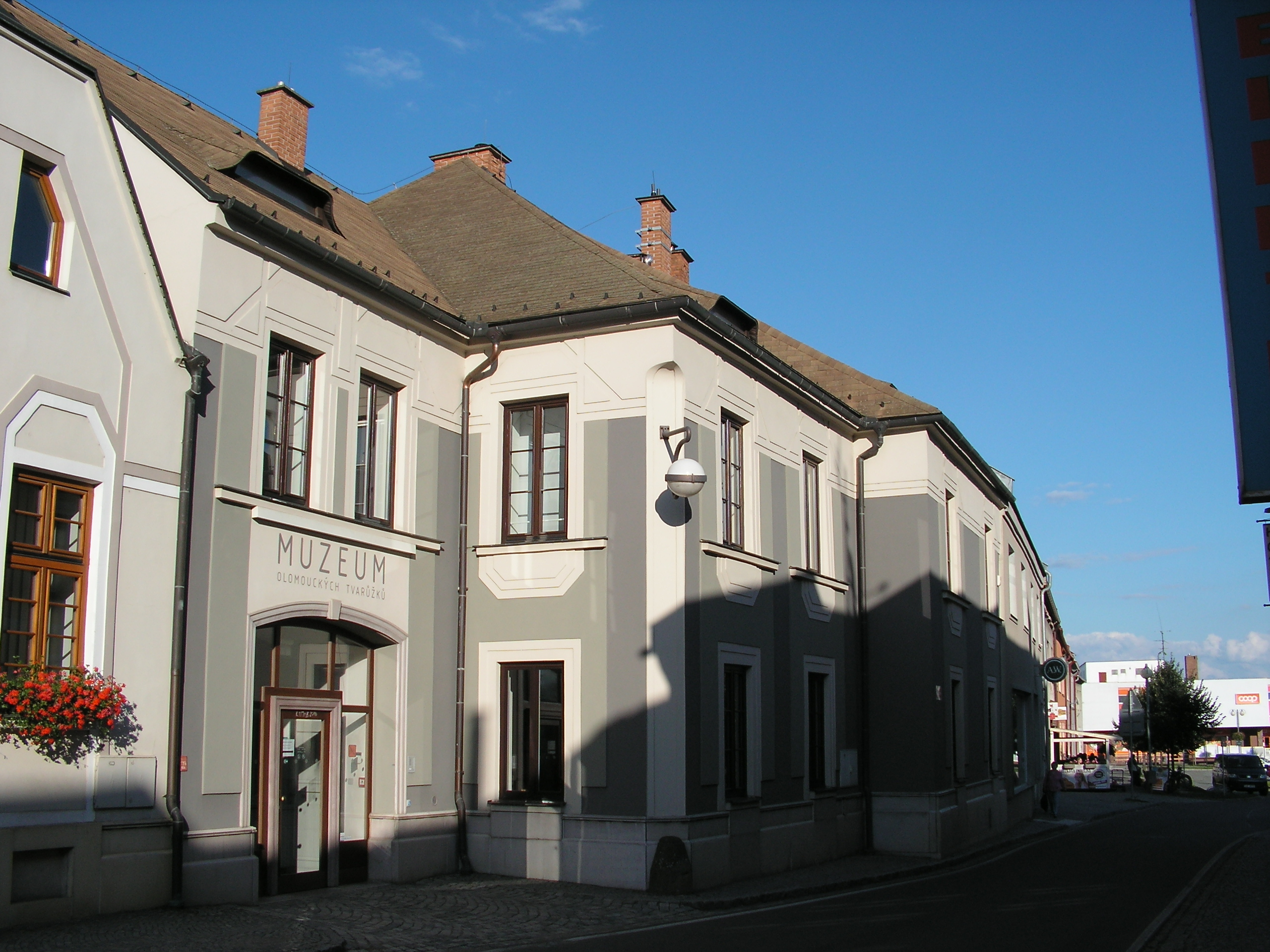
Museum of Olomoucké tvarůžky

There is a museum devoted to the cheese at the A. W. Company production plant in Loštice.

== See also ==
- Harzer
- Tvorog
