= Loštice pottery =

The Loštice pottery, also called the Loštice goblets (Czech: loštické poháry), are unique pottery with nodules on the surface. Traditionally they have been massively produced in Loštice, a town in the Olomouc Region of the Czech Republic and the surrounding area (northern Moravia) since the end of the 14th or at the beginning of the 15th century and ceased to be manufactured sometime in the early 16th. These goblets have been a highly prized form of trading goods, therefore they are found in many castles and settlements of Central Europe.

The popularity and prevalence of this type of pottery was such in the late Middle Ages that even an example of it can be found in the famous painting The Garden of Earthly Delights (~1500) by Hieronymus Bosch.

== History and technology of production ==
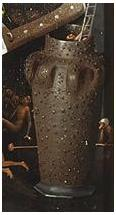
Gigantic Loštice goblet pictured on the right side of Bosch′s triptych Garden of Earthly Delights

Typical slim goblets with nodules on the surface (so-called "Loštice effect") and a plain rim first appeared at the beginning of 15th century. One of the oldest examples is the goblet discovered at Tovačov, which contained a hoard of the Prague groschen minted by kings Charles IV and Wenceslaus IV. Taking into account the goblet's type and the dates of minting these coins, probably the goblet was made at the turn of the 14th and 15th century. Around the mid 15th century, craftsmen began to produce goblets with a wreath handle (type II – see below). Some of the Loštice goblets had been edged with silver. The manufacture of these goblets ceased sometime between 1530 and 1550, when the handiwork of southern Moravian craftsmen of higher quality replaced them on the market.

Their existence was gradually forgotten and finally rediscovered with the development of archaeology in the last third of the 19th century (first slim brown-colored goblets with nodules in the surface were found in Loštice in 1874).

The pottery from Loštice have been divided into five basic ceramics categories. The first comprises blister-marked surface ceramics (with the nodules), the second is very well baked, so-called stoneware, the third is made up of soft kaolinite clay, mostly white baked, the fourth includes sand, and the fifth contains graphite. Craftsmen added graphite slate to fat clay. The Svinov deposits they used, however, contained a natural admixture of pyrite. The latter, when fired at high temperature, became active by creating intumescent gas bubbles, which burst, exploding, forming on the surface the small bumps or craters.

Vessels were turned on rapidly rotating potters' wheels; the potters used oxidation baked in simple furnaces, with combined firing and heating space. Vessels were fired at a temperature almost 1000 °C, getting the "Loštice effect" required more than 1200 °C. The surface tint was light or dark brown-colored.

=== Morphology of ceramics ===
The largest number of pottery are mugs with a barrel-shaped body, flat base and various edging. The edging is a period indicative. Very common form is the goblet with blister-surface or made from soft kaolinite clay. Other forms are jugs with a cylindrical or S-shaped neck, bowls with a conical body and flat base, often decorated with red markings, vessels with a conical body and a club-shaped rim, lids, miniature vessels, tiles, pipes and flagstones.

The most far-famed are the so-called "Loštice goblets", categorised in three basic classes:

- Type I is slim with a circular rim, group A having flat walls, whilst in group B walls have curvature.
- Type II has a wreath handle on the body, group A with a cylindrical neck and group B conical neck.
- Type III has a slim body and rim.

Ceramics from Loštice were decorated with engravings as parallel grooves or notches, raised forms, above all the so-called lípané maliny ("sticked raspberries") – made up of the soft clay wheel-shaped ornaments decorated with small nodules like balls – and painting, especially red.

== Imitations ==
Loštice was not the sole site for production of pottery displaying the Loštice effect. Pottery workshops have been discovered in nearby towns and villages Žádlovice, Líšnice, Svinov, Mohelnice and Masnice.

Goblets of type II were very popular thanks to their unusual shape and surface. They have been found in towns and castles of Moravia and Central Europe; their range of occurrence covered the area from Poland to Croatia or from Hungary to Northern Italy. Success of the Loštice goblets on the market was an inspiration for potters to devise similar vessels, but these imitations often surpassed the originals in quality. In the area along the Danube river, goblets were produced with sand sprinkled on the surface and with a brown glaze.

From Budapest there are known goblets in Loštice style, which were made up with a majolica glaze and richly adorned.
