= Abraham Neuda =

Austrian rabbi (1812-1854)

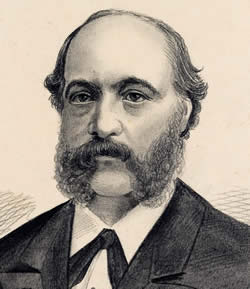
Rabbi Abraham Neuda (circa 1850)

Abraham Neuda (1812, Loštice – 22 February 1854, Loštice) was an Austrian rabbi.

He was the son of Rabbi Aaron Neuda of Loštice, and the nephew of Rabbi Jacob Neuda of Lobnig (Lomnice), Moravia. In 1830 he entered the Talmudic school at Mikulov, at whose head was Landesrabbiner Nehemiah Trebitsch.

While he was at Mikulov his father died (1834), and the community of Loštice elected Abraham as his successor. Against this election, in accordance with a privilege vested in the district rabbi by law, Nehemiah Trebitsch interposed a veto. This action gave rise to legal proceedings, which were pressed by both parties for six years, but which finally terminated in favor of Neuda, after he had passed an examination. He married the future author Fanny Schmiedl. In 1854 Fanny wrote the first Jewish prayer book known to have been written by a woman for women, called Hours of Devotion; it was translated into English and published in the United States 12 years later. In 2015 a plaque honoring her was unveiled in Loštice, where she lived while her husband was a rabbi there.

Abraham Neuda wrote the following works: "Eine Auswahl Gottesdienstlicher Vorträge, Gehalten in der Synagoge zu Loschitz" (Vienna, 1845); "Die Nächstenliebe im Lichte der Gotteslehre," sermon preached on the first day of Passover, 1847 (ib. 1847); "Namen der Talmudisten" (in "Orient, Lit." 1845, Nos. 9 et seq.). He left in manuscript: "Die Namen der Farben in Bibel und Talmud"; "Versuch einer Psychologie nach Anschauung des Talmuds"; and "Eine Gesch. der Juden in Mähren," extracts from which appeared in "Neuzeit" (Vienna, 1867).
