= Herz-Jesu-Kirche =

- Church of the Sacred Heart of Jesus
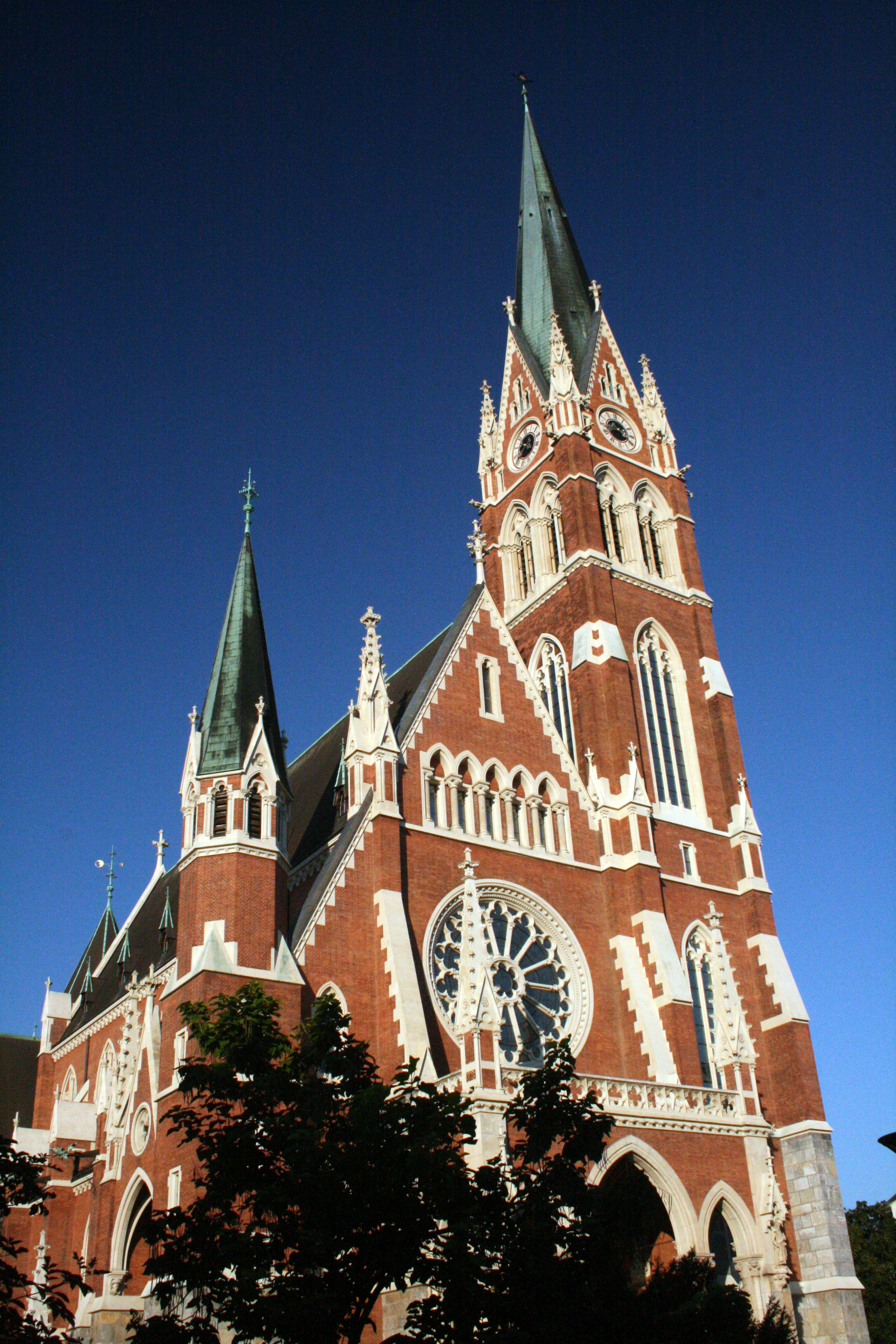
- Herz-Jesu-Kirche
- 47°04′11″N 15°27′21″E
- Location: Graz, Styria
- Country: Austria
- Denomination: Roman Catholic
- Website: graz-herz-jesu.at

History
- Consecrated: 1891

Architecture
- Architect: Georg Hauberrisser
- Style: Neogothic
- Years built: 1881–1887
- Construction cost: 728,943 gulden all donated by local population

The Herz-Jesu-Kirche (English: Church of the Sacred Heart of Jesus) is the largest church in Graz, Austria. It was designed down to the last detail by architect Georg Hauberrisser and constructed from 1881 to 1887.

The church was designed in the Neogothic style, with a large, high nave and under-church. The tower is 109.6 meters tall, making it the third-highest church tower in Austria. Of special note are the stained glass windows, which are among the few extant examples in Austria of Neogothic stained glass.

The altar area was remodelled in 1988 by Gustav Troger, just after the centenary of the church. Apart from that, everything is still according to the architect's concept.
