= Lomnice (Bruntál District) =

- Municipality
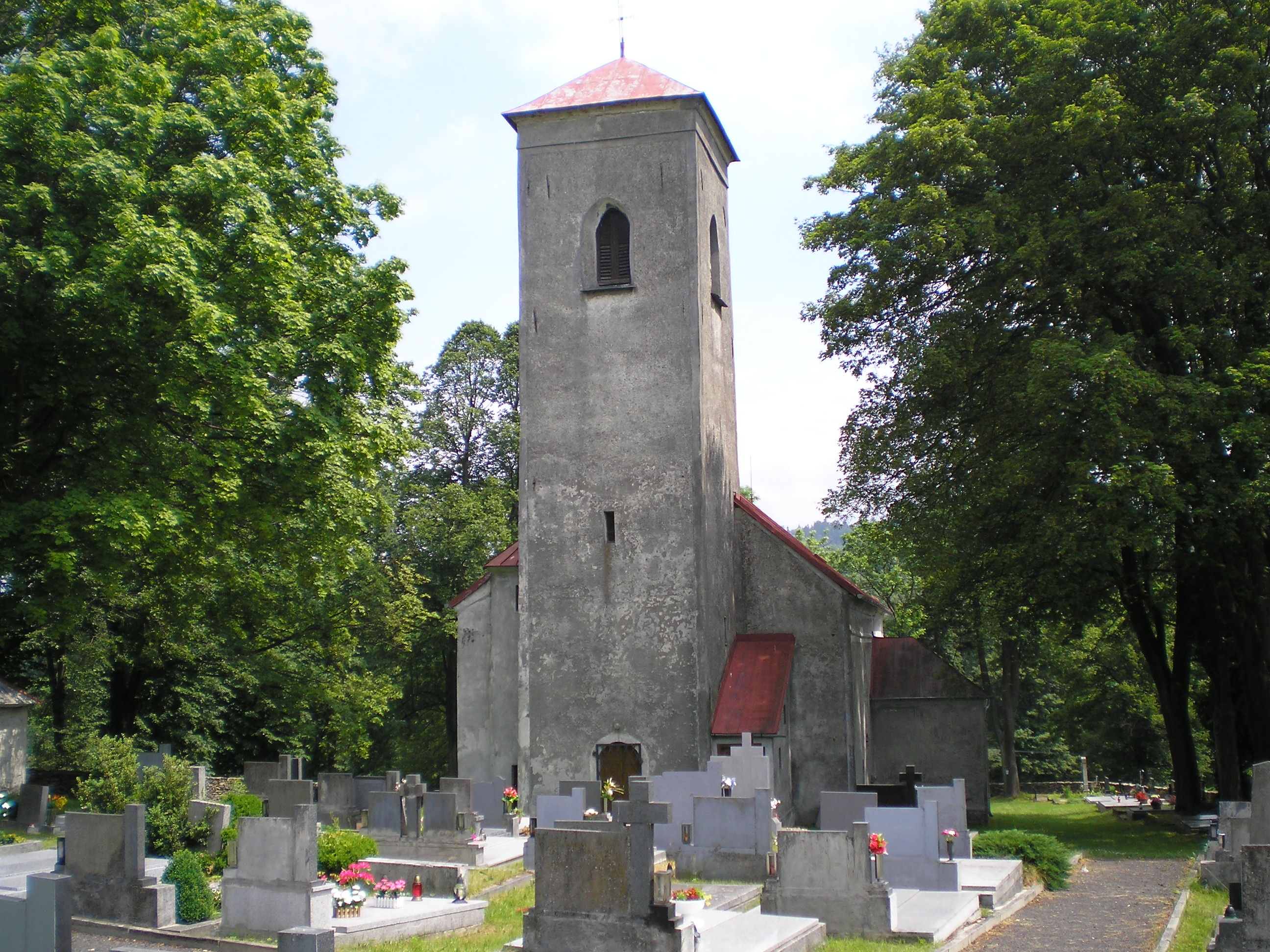
- Church of Saint George

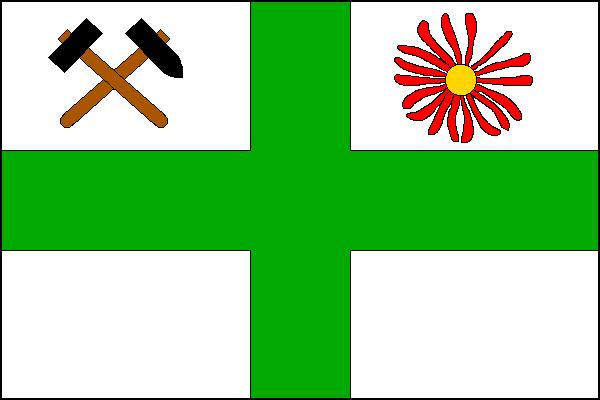
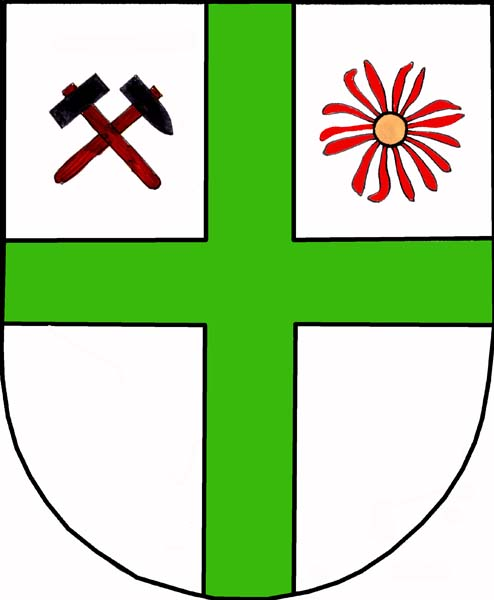
- Flag Coat of arms

- Location in the Czech Republic
- Coordinates: 49°52′16″N 17°24′54″E
- Country: Czech Republic
- Region: Moravian-Silesian
- District: Bruntál
- First mentioned: 1317

Area
  - Total: 27.22 km^{2} (10.51 sq mi)
- Elevation: 548 m (1,798 ft)

Population (2026-01-01)
  - Total: 459
  - Density: 16.9/km^{2} (43.7/sq mi)
- Time zone: UTC+1 (CET)
  - Summer (DST): UTC+2 (CEST)
- Postal code: 793 02
- Website: www.obec-lomnice.cz

Lomnice (German: Lobnig) is a municipality and village in Bruntál District in the Moravian-Silesian Region of the Czech Republic. It has about 500 inhabitants.

== Administrative division ==
Lomnice consists of two municipal parts (in brackets population according to the 2021 census):

- Lomnice (402)
- Tylov (80)

== Demographics ==
Historical population
| Year | Pop. | ±% |
|---|---|---|
| 1869 | 1,509 | — |
| 1880 | 1,548 | +2.6% |
| 1890 | 1,485 | −4.1% |
| 1900 | 1,464 | −1.4% |
| 1910 | 1,419 | −3.1% |
| 1921 | 1,376 | −3.0% |
| 1930 | 1,403 | +2.0% |
| 1950 | 841 | −40.1% |
| 1961 | 709 | −15.7% |
| 1970 | 686 | −3.2% |
| 1980 | 668 | −2.6% |
| 1991 | 609 | −8.8% |
| 2001 | 545 | −10.5% |
| 2011 | 474 | −13.0% |
| 2021 | 482 | +1.7% |
Source: Censuses

== Notable people ==
- Fanny Neuda (1819–1894), writer
