= Loštice =

- Town
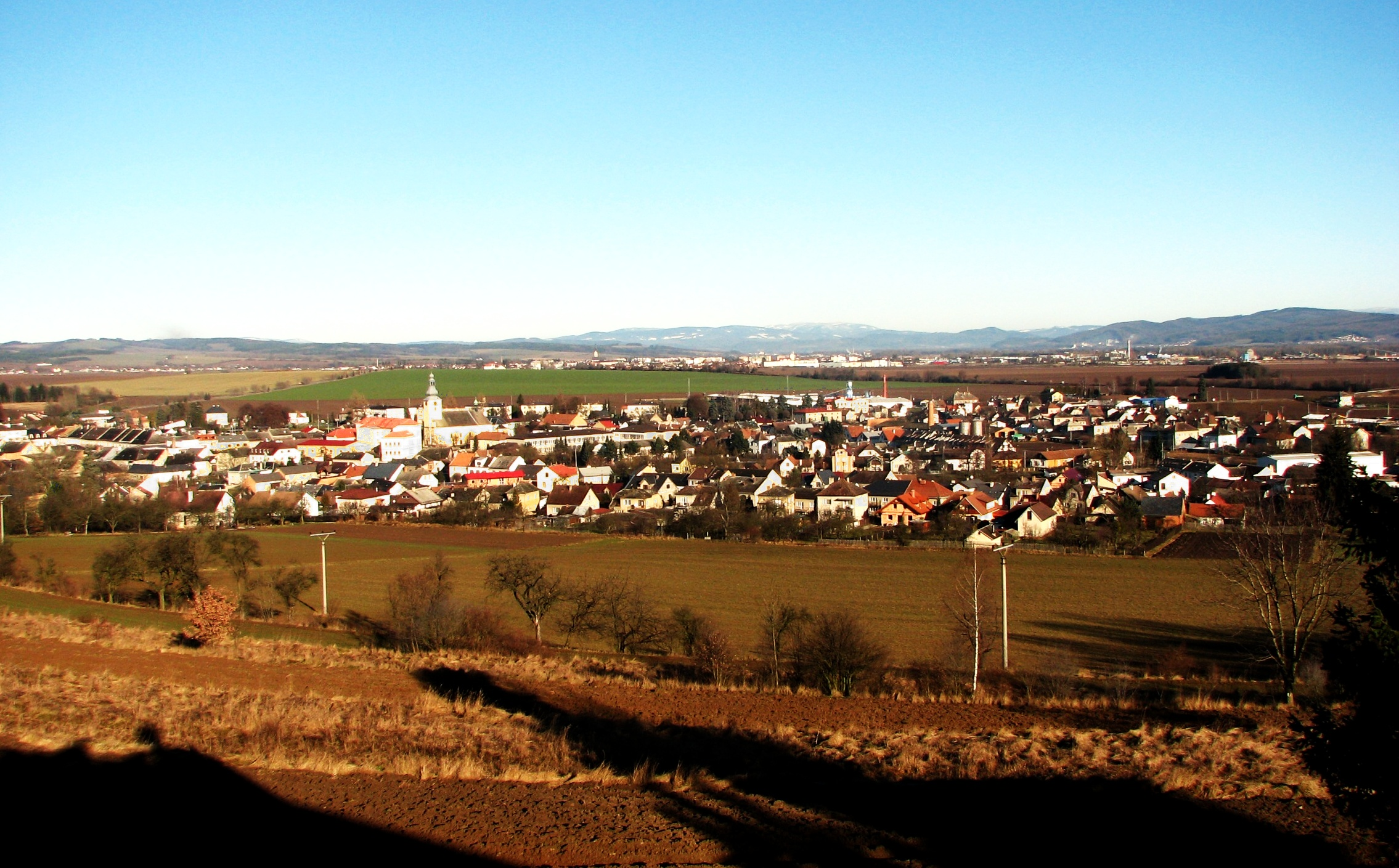
- Loštice

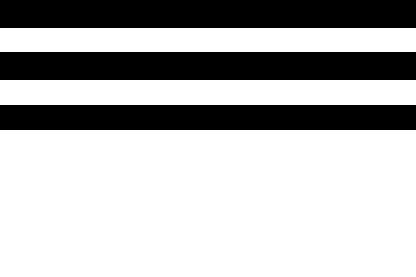
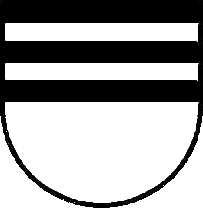
- Flag Coat of arms

- Location in the Czech Republic
- Coordinates: 49°44′33″N 16°55′40″E
- Country: Czech Republic
- Region: Olomouc
- District: Šumperk
- First mentioned: 1078

Government
  - Mayor: Šárka Havelková Seifertová

Area
  - Total: 12.00 km^{2} (4.63 sq mi)
- Elevation: 258 m (846 ft)

Population (2026-01-01)
  - Total: 3,078
  - Density: 256.5/km^{2} (664.3/sq mi)
- Time zone: UTC+1 (CET)
  - Summer (DST): UTC+2 (CEST)
- Postal code: 789 83
- Website: www.mu-lostice.cz

Loštice (Czech pronunciation: [ˈloʃcɪtsɛ]; German: Loschitz) is a town in Šumperk District in the Olomouc Region of the Czech Republic. It has about 3,100 inhabitants. The town is located on the Třebůvka River, on the border between the Zábřeh Highlands and Mohelnice Depression.

Loštice is known for the production of aromatic cheese called Olomoucké tvarůžky.

== Administrative division ==
Loštice consists of two municipal parts (in brackets population according to the 2021 census):

- Loštice (2,671)
- Žádlovice (187)

== Geography ==
Loštice is located about 25 kilometres (16 mi) south of Šumperk and 28 km (17 mi) northwest of Olomouc. It lies on the border between the Zábřeh Highlands and Mohelnice Depression. The highest point is a hill at 401 m (1,316 ft) above sea level. The Třebůvka River flows through the town.

== History ==
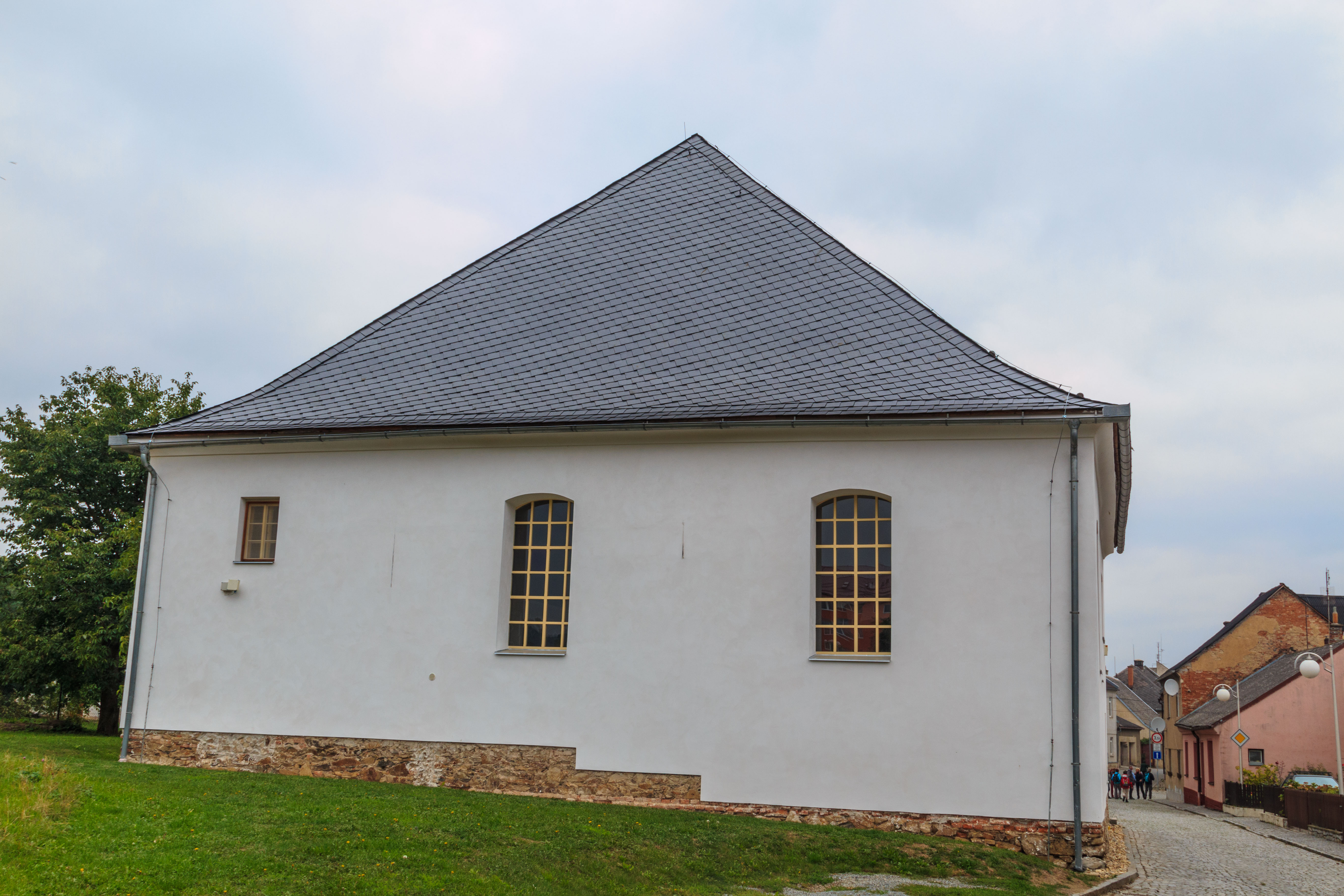
Synagogue in Loštice

The first written mention of Loštice is in a deed of Bishop Bruno von Schauenburg from 1267. Loštice was probably promoted to a town in 1353. In 1414, Loštice was acquired by Boček II of Poděbrady as a part of the Bouzov estate. After his death, the estate was owned by Victor of Kunštát and Poděbrady and then by George of Poděbrady, who administered the estate since 1444.

The presence of Jews is first documented in 1544. In 1554, a Jewish cemetery was established, and the synagogue was built in 1571. From 1581 to 1850, the Jewish community was independent of town administration. The community perished as a result of the Holocaust.

== Demographics ==
Historical population

Year	Pop.	±%
1869	2,787	—
1880	2,951	+5.9%
1890	2,764	−6.3%
1900	2,707	−2.1%
1910	2,859	+5.6%

Year	Pop.	±%
1921	2,902	+1.5%
1930	2,940	+1.3%
1950	2,682	−8.8%
1961	2,872	+7.1%
1970	3,144	+9.5%

Year	Pop.	±%
1980	3,329	+5.9%
1991	2,999	−9.9%
2001	3,063	+2.1%
2011	2,968	−3.1%
2021	2,858	−3.7%

Source: Censuses

== Economy ==
Loštice is known for the production of aromatic cheese called Olomoucké tvarůžky.

== Transport ==
The D35 motorway (part of the European route E442), which connects Olomouc with the Hradec Králové Region, runs east of the town.

== Sights ==
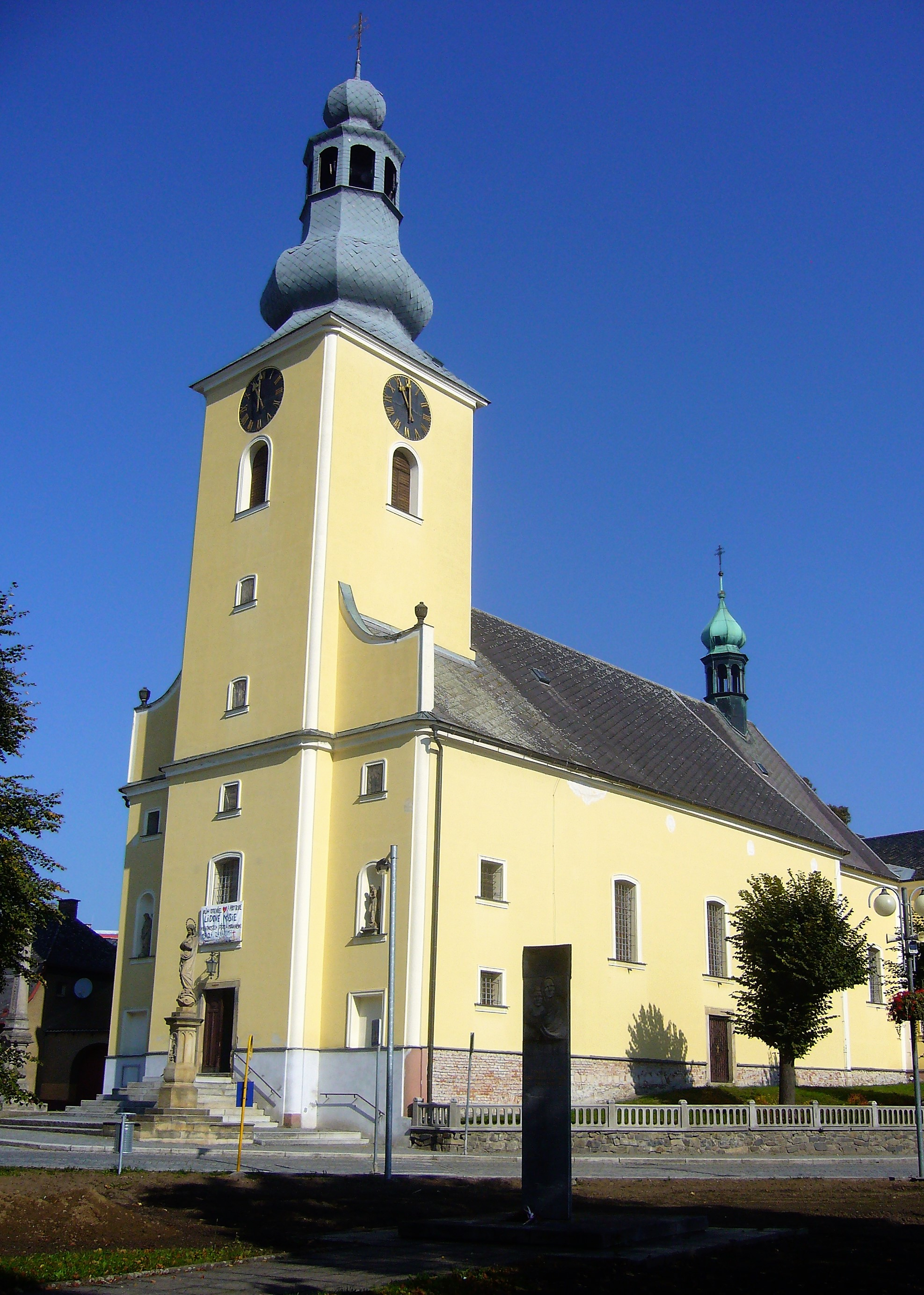
Church of Saint Procopius

Among the most significant monuments belongs the former synagogue, today a library and a small museum, and the Church of Saint Procopius. The church with the late Gothic core was rebuilt to its current Neoclassical form at the end of the 18th century.

In Žádlovice is a late Baroque castle with a landscape park.

Since 2014, the museum of Olomoucké tvarůžky has been opened in Loštice.

== Notable people ==
- Abraham Neuda (1812–1854), Austrian rabbi
- Fanny Neuda (1819–1894), writer; lived and worked here
- Asriel Günzig (1868–1931), Polish rabbi; served as the rabbi of Loštice in 1899–1920

== See also ==
- Loštice pottery
