= Bouzov =

- Municipality
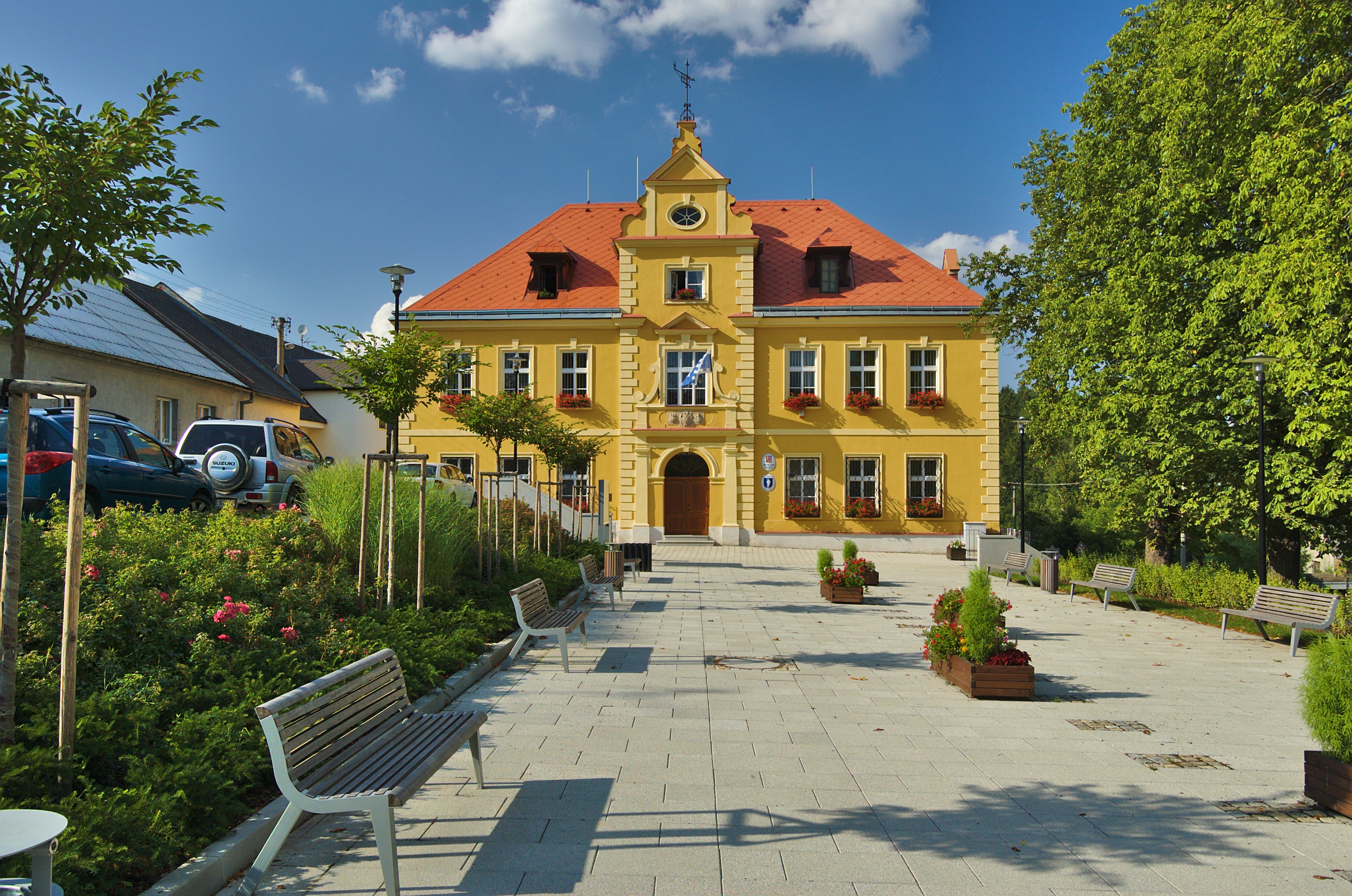
- Municipal office

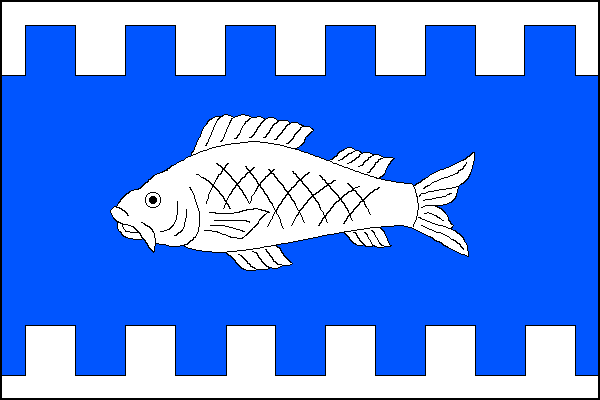
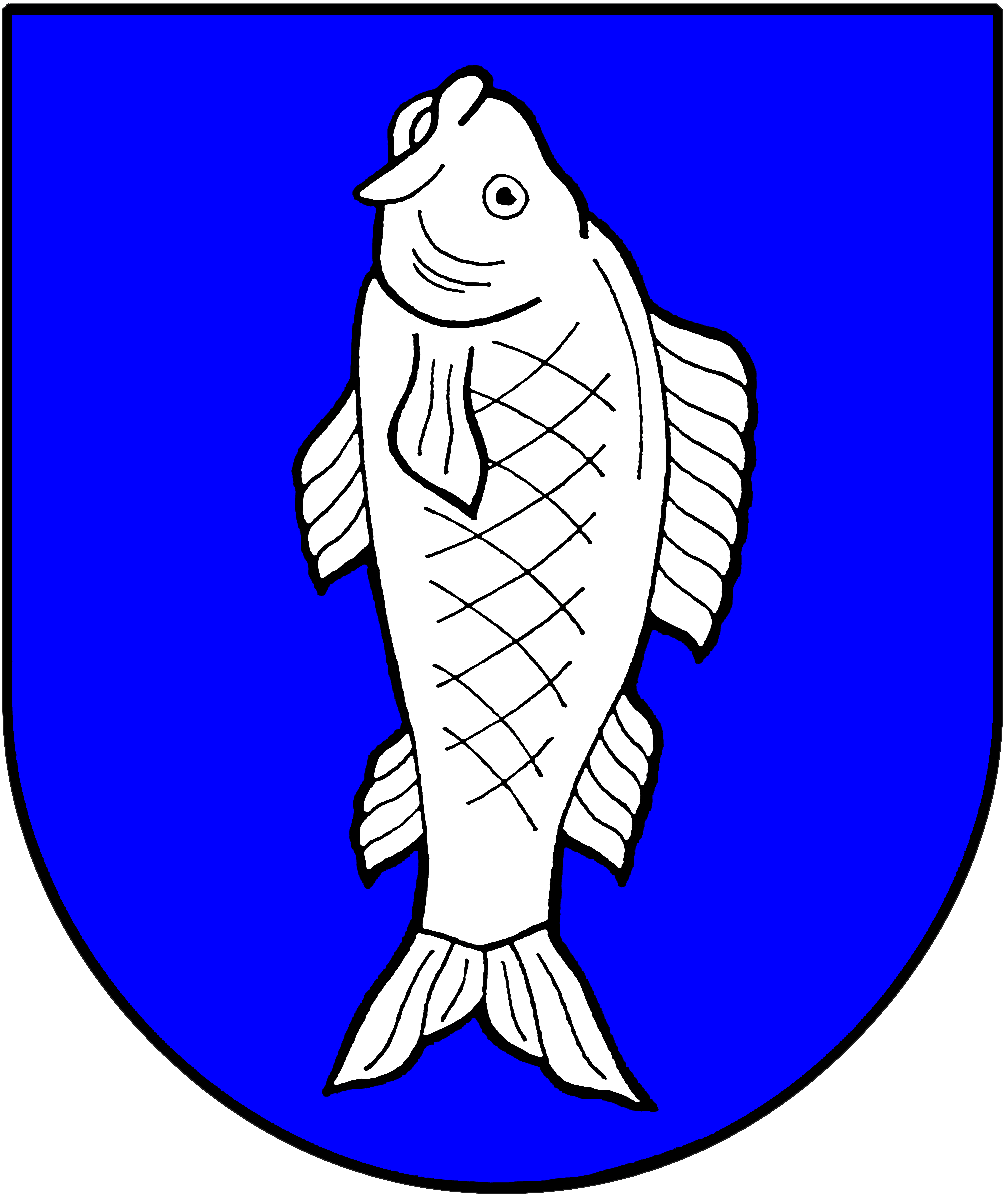
- Flag Coat of arms

- Location in the Czech Republic
- Coordinates: 49°42′15″N 16°53′35″E
- Country: Czech Republic
- Region: Olomouc
- District: Olomouc
- First mentioned: 1317

Area
  - Total: 42.31 km^{2} (16.34 sq mi)
- Elevation: 445 m (1,460 ft)

Population (2026-01-01)
  - Total: 1,508
  - Density: 35.64/km^{2} (92.31/sq mi)
- Time zone: UTC+1 (CET)
  - Summer (DST): UTC+2 (CEST)
- Postal code: 783 25
- Website: www.obec-bouzov.cz

Bouzov (German: Busau) is a municipality and village in Olomouc District in the Olomouc Region of the Czech Republic. It has about 1,500 inhabitants. The municipality is known for the Bouzov Castle, protected as a national cultural monument.

== Administrative division ==
Bouzov consists of 13 municipal parts (in brackets population according to the 2021 census):

- Bouzov (518)
- Bezděkov (35)
- Blažov (46)
- Doly (25)
- Hvozdečko (115)
- Jeřmaň (87)
- Kadeřín (19)
- Kovářov (72)
- Kozov (80)
- Obectov (89)
- Olešnice (136)
- Podolí (179)
- Svojanov (24)

== Etymology ==
The name is derived from the personal name Búz, who was the first documented owner of the village.

== Geography ==
Bouzov is located about 27 kilometres (17 mi) northwest of Olomouc. It lies in the Zábřeh Highlands. The highest point is the hill Holé vršky at 596 m (1,955 ft) above sea level. The Třebůvka River flows through the municipality.

== History ==
The village was founded below the Bouzov Castle, which was built for protection of a trade route from Olomouc to Jevíčko. Until 1695, Bouzov was owned by various noble families, most notably by the Lords of Kunštát and Poděbrady. From 1695, the estate was a property of the Teutonic Order.

== Demographics ==
Historical population

Year	Pop.	±%
1869	3,255	—
1880	3,129	−3.9%
1890	3,054	−2.4%
1900	3,070	+0.5%
1910	3,030	−1.3%

Year	Pop.	±%
1921	2,847	−6.0%
1930	2,700	−5.2%
1950	1,953	−27.7%
1961	2,030	+3.9%
1970	1,810	−10.8%

Year	Pop.	±%
1980	1,621	−10.4%
1991	1,474	−9.1%
2001	1,476	+0.1%
2011	1,501	+1.7%
2021	1,425	−5.1%

Source: Censuses

== Transport ==
There are no railways or major roads passing through the municipality.

== Sights ==
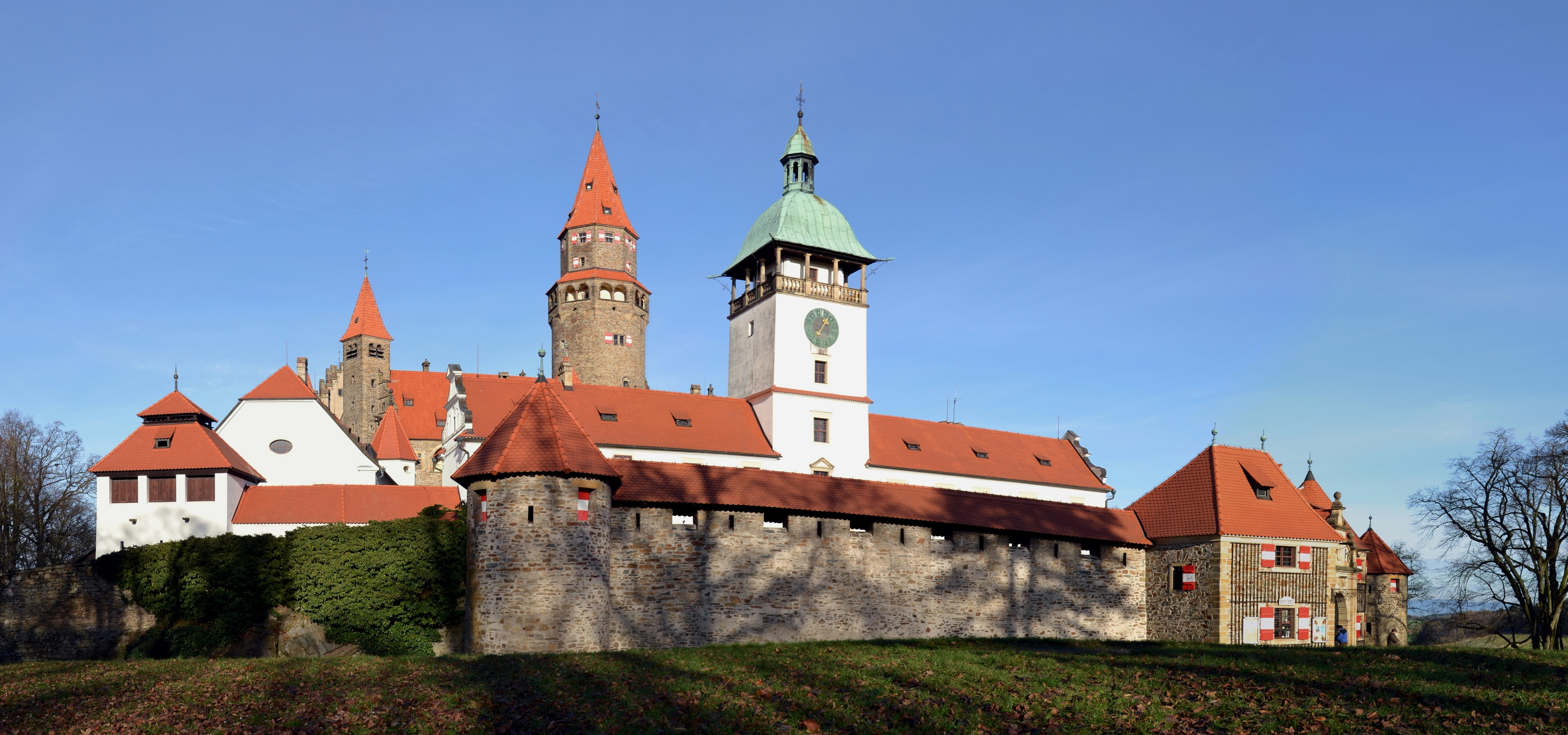
Bouzov Castle

Bouzov is well known for the Bouzov Castle, which is a major tourist destination. Today the castle is owned by the state and offers guided tours. Since 1999, the castle has been protected as a national cultural monument.

The Church of Saint Gotthard is a Baroque building with a Gothic-Renaissance core. Originally it was a castle chapel.

== Notable people ==
- Hans Balatka (1827–1899), American conductor and composer
