= Skalka (Prostějov District) =

- Municipality
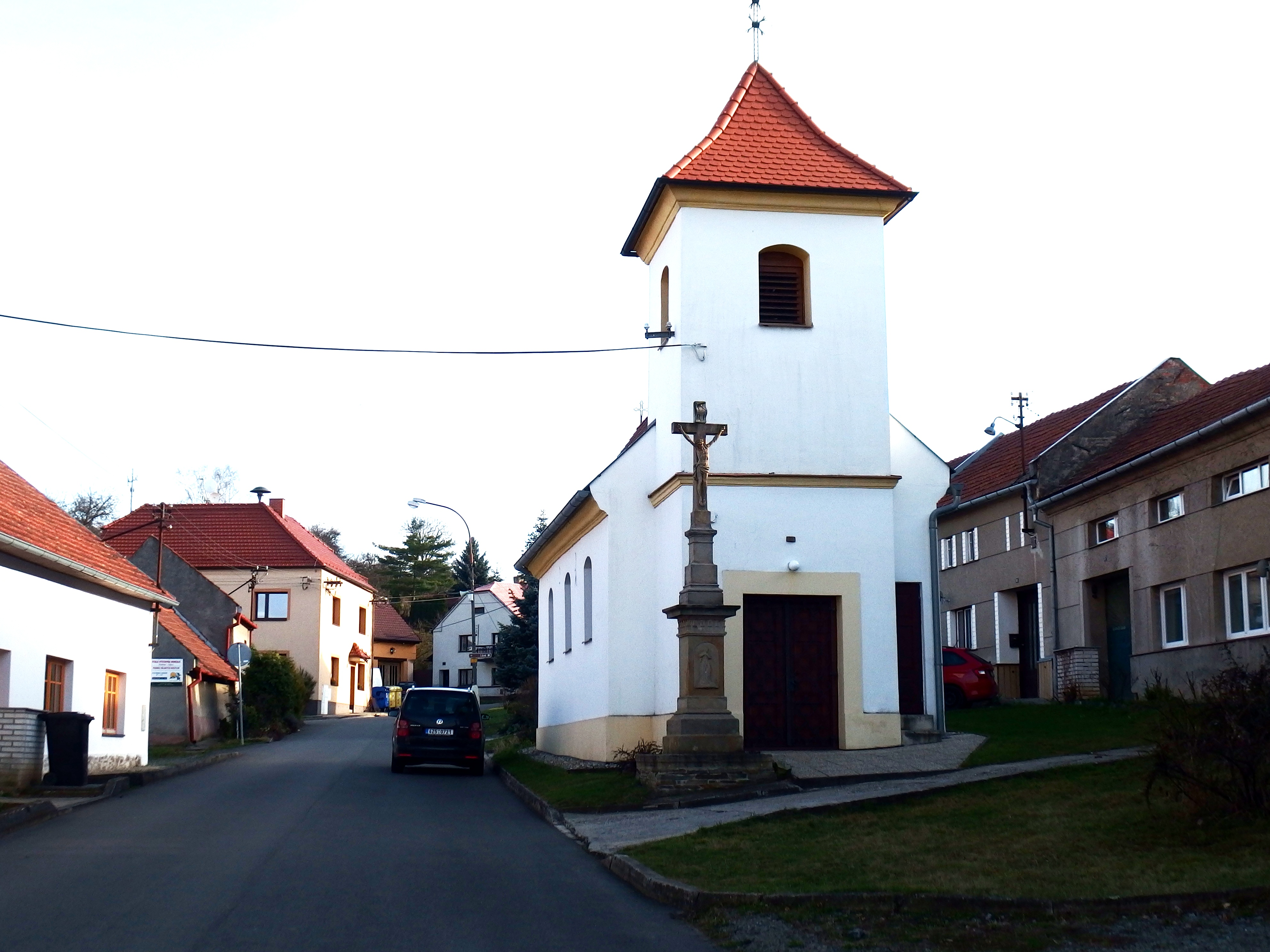
- Chapel of Saint John the Baptist

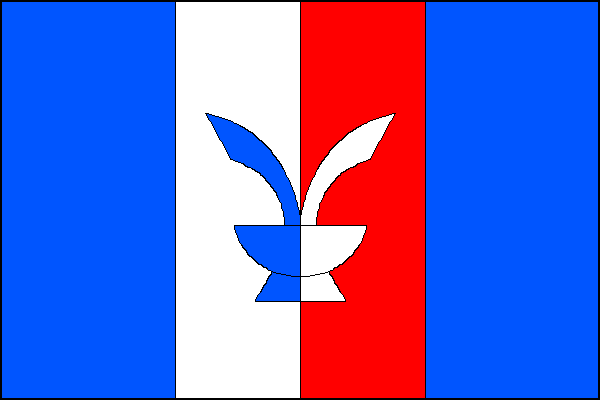
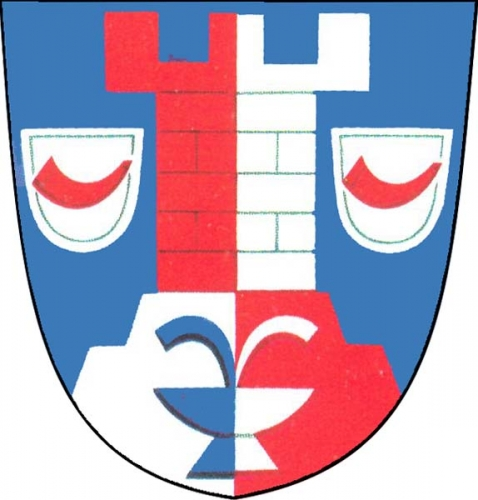
- Flag Coat of arms

- Location in the Czech Republic
- Coordinates: 49°24′11″N 17°10′11″E
- Country: Czech Republic
- Region: Olomouc
- District: Prostějov
- First mentioned: 1550

Area
  - Total: 1.74 km^{2} (0.67 sq mi)
- Elevation: 218 m (715 ft)

Population (2026-01-01)
  - Total: 265
  - Density: 152/km^{2} (394/sq mi)
- Time zone: UTC+1 (CET)
  - Summer (DST): UTC+2 (CEST)
- Postal code: 798 24
- Website: www.obecskalka.cz

Skalka (German: Strerowitz) is a spa municipality and village in Prostějov District in the Olomouc Region of the Czech Republic. It has about 300 inhabitants.

Skalka lies approximately 9 kilometres (6 mi) south-east of Prostějov, 22 km (14 mi) south of Olomouc, and 212 km (132 mi) east of Prague.

== Demographics ==
Historical population
Year	Pop.	±%
1869	237	—
1880	255	+7.6%
1890	262	+2.7%
1900	277	+5.7%
1910	366	+32.1%
1921	367	+0.3%
1930	370	+0.8%
1950	308	−16.8%
1961	303	−1.6%
1970	268	−11.6%
1980	263	−1.9%
1991	228	−13.3%
2001	252	+10.5%
2011	245	−2.8%
2021	263	+7.3%
Source: Censuses

== Economy ==
Skalka is known for a small spa. Alkaline-sulphuric mineral springs spring here, which are used for therapeutic baths.

== Notable people ==
- Mojmír Chytil (born 1999), footballer
