= Příkazy =

Municipality in the Czech Republic

- Municipality
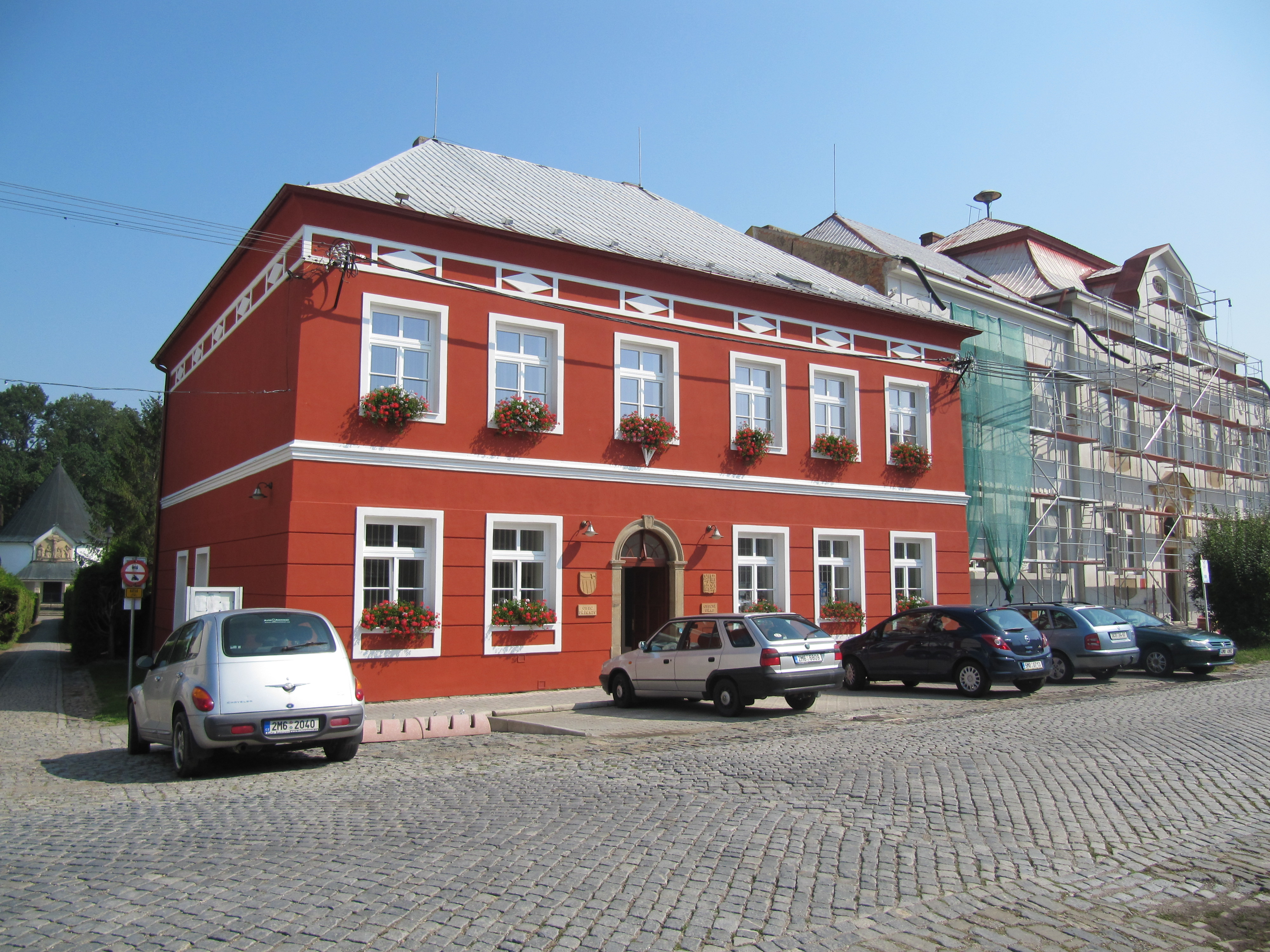
- Municipal office

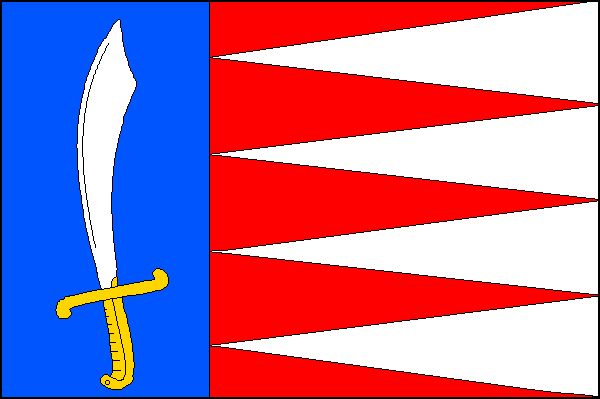
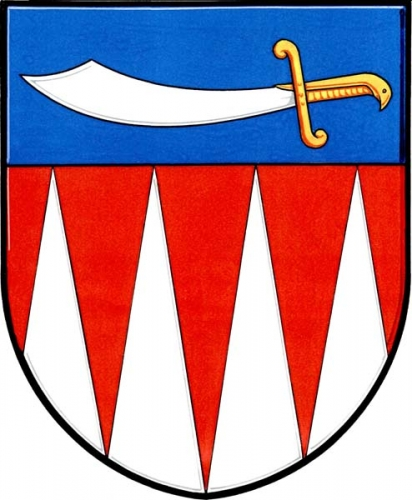
- Flag Coat of arms

- Location in the Czech Republic
- Coordinates: 49°38′37″N 17°8′36″E
- Country: Czech Republic
- Region: Olomouc
- District: Olomouc
- First mentioned: 1250

Area
  - Total: 13.98 km^{2} (5.40 sq mi)
- Elevation: 226 m (741 ft)

Population (2026-01-01)
  - Total: 1,311
  - Density: 93.78/km^{2} (242.9/sq mi)
- Time zone: UTC+1 (CET)
  - Summer (DST): UTC+2 (CEST)
- Postal code: 783 33
- Website: www.prikazy.cz

Příkazy (German: Przikas) is a municipality and village in Olomouc District in the Olomouc Region of the Czech Republic. It has about 1,300 inhabitants. The old part of the village is well preserved and is protected as a village monument reservation.

== Administrative division ==
Příkazy consists of two municipal parts (in brackets population according to the 2021 census):

- Příkazy (952)
- Hynkov (333)

== Geography ==
Příkazy is located about 9 kilometres (6 mi) northwest of Olomouc. It lies in a flat landscape in the Upper Morava Valley. The northernmost part of the municipality lies in the Litovelské Pomoraví Protected Landscape Area and the Morava River flows through it.

== History ==
The first written mention of Příkazy is from 1250. Hynkov was first mentioned in 1437.

== Demographics ==
Historical population

Year	Pop.	±%
1869	1,250	—
1880	1,357	+8.6%
1890	1,387	+2.2%
1900	1,384	−0.2%
1910	1,526	+10.3%

Year	Pop.	±%
1921	1,629	+6.7%
1930	1,599	−1.8%
1950	1,361	−14.9%
1961	1,340	−1.5%
1970	1,350	+0.7%

Year	Pop.	±%
1980	1,360	+0.7%
1991	1,207	−11.3%
2001	1,204	−0.2%
2011	1,211	+0.6%
2021	1,285	+6.1%

Source: Censuses

== Transport ==
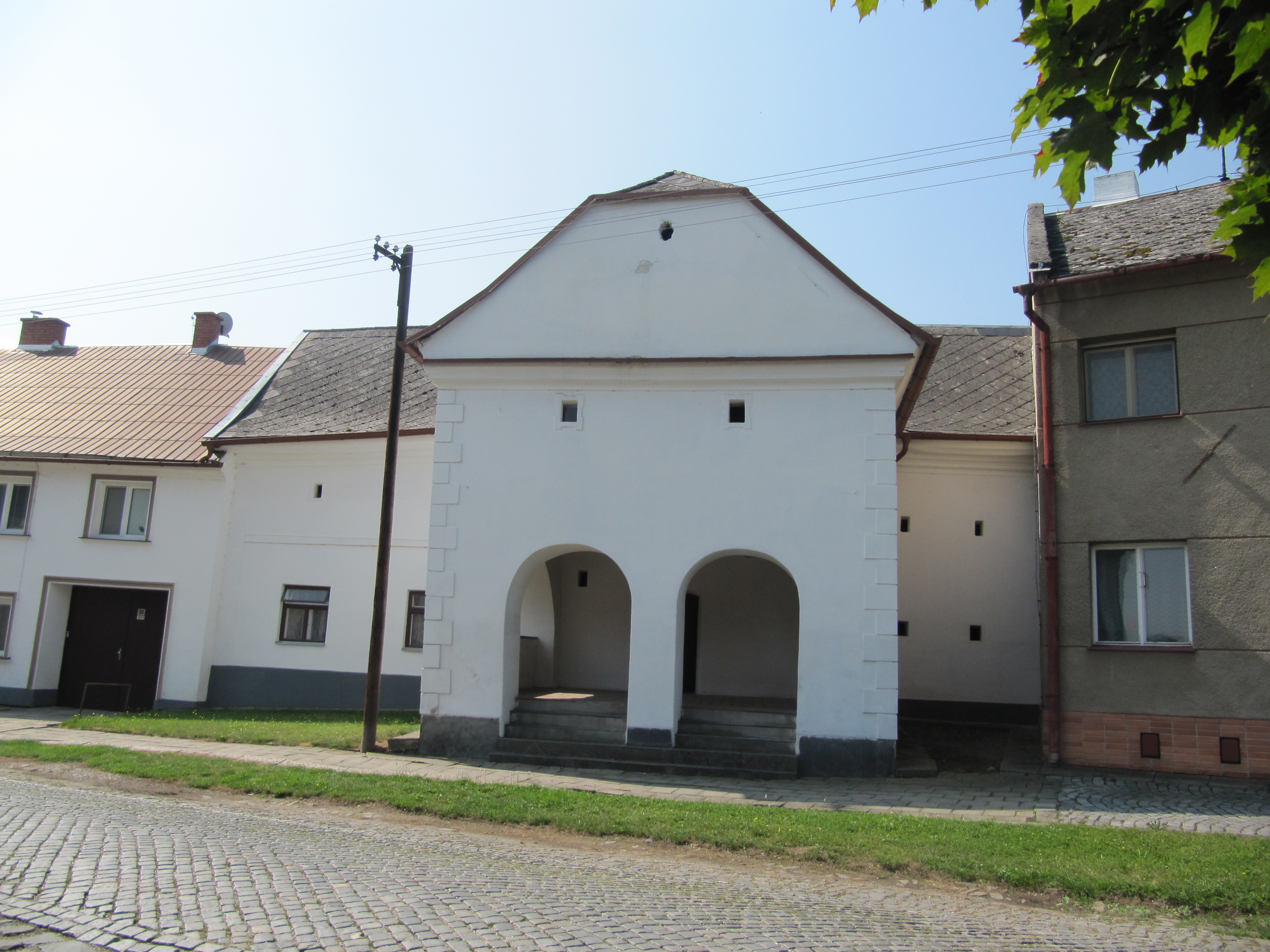
House in the monument reservation

The D35 motorway runs through the municipality.

Příkazy is located on the railway line Olomouc–Drahanovice.

== Sights ==
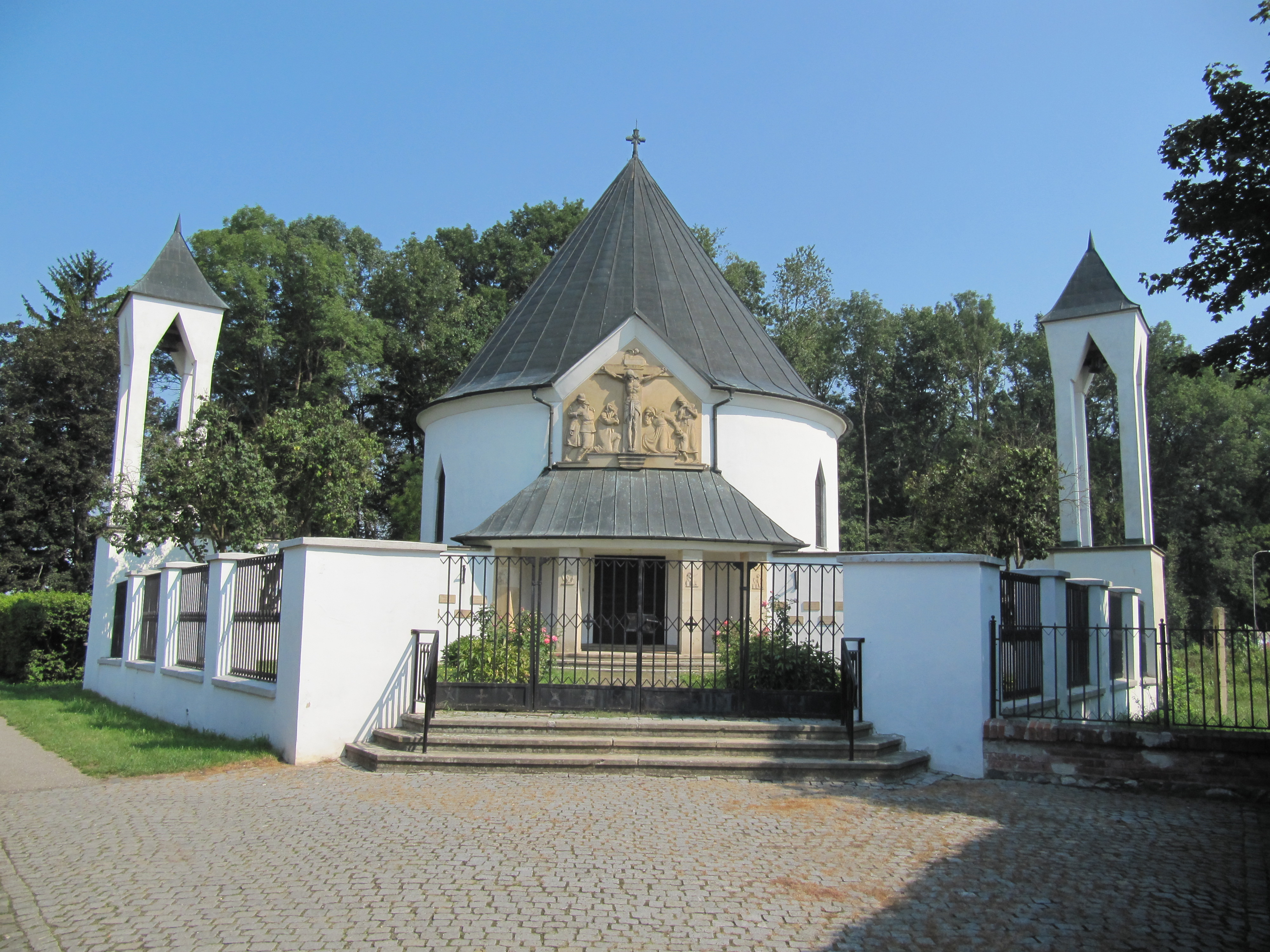
Chapel of Saints Cyril and Methodius

The Chapel of Saints Cyril and Methodius was built in 1924–1926 and is an example of modern sacral architecture. The interior was painted by Jano Köhler.

Příkazy is known for the Hanakian Open Air Museum. It is a unique example of clay folk architecture of the Haná region. The complex consists of three barns from the first half of the 19th century and one barn from 1987, followed by a garden with fruit trees and a complete Hanakian farm with a residential and farming part from 1875.
