= Olomouc Region =

Region of the Czech Republic

Coordinates: 49.72°N 17.11°E

Olomouc Region Olomoucký kraj
- Region
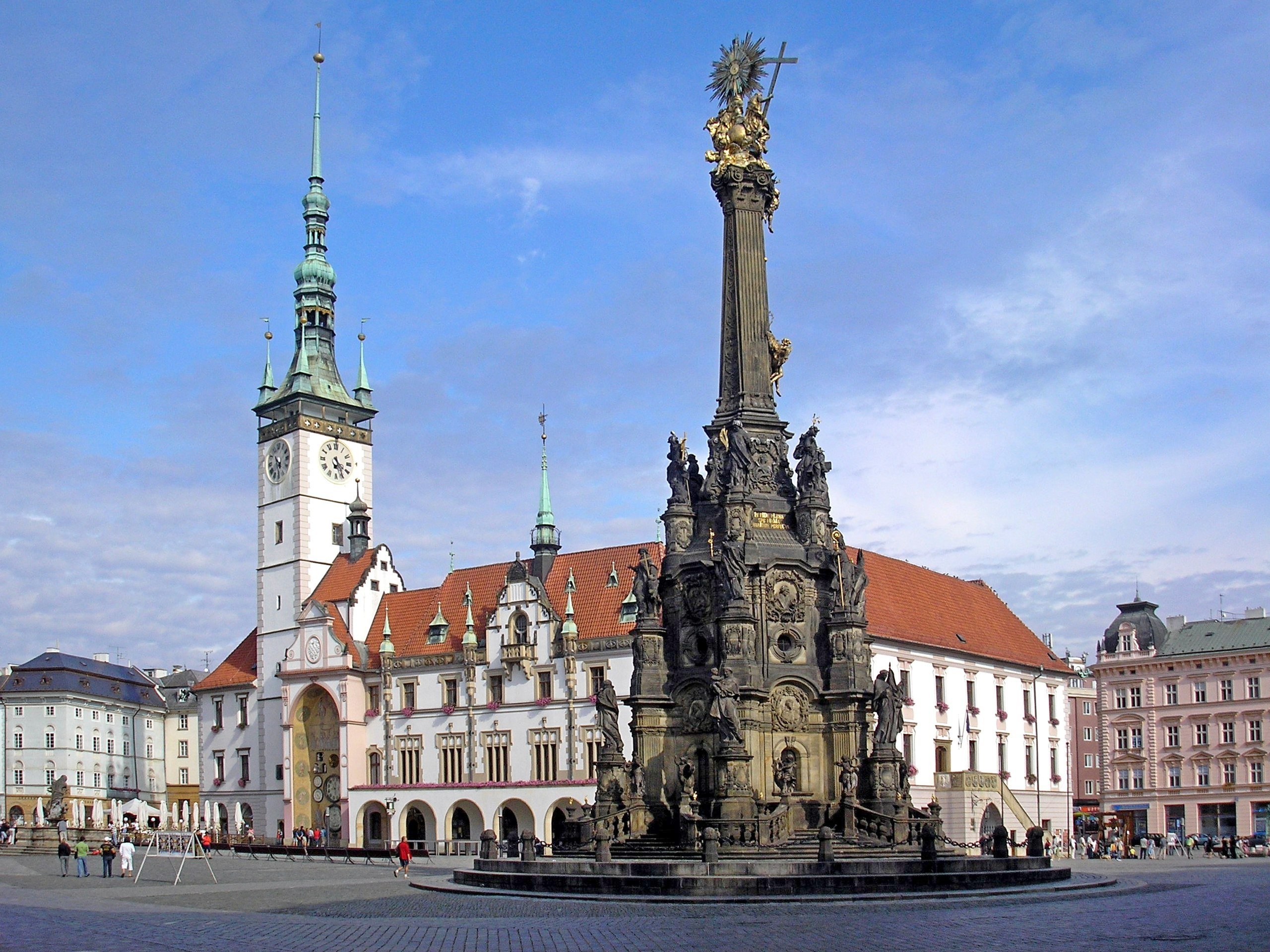
- Olomouc

- Flag Coat of arms

- Country: Czech Republic
- Capital: Olomouc
- Districts: Jeseník District, Olomouc District, Přerov District, Prostějov District, Šumperk District

Government
  - Governor: Ladislav Okleštěk (ANO)

Area
  - Total: 5,266.57 km^{2} (2,033.43 sq mi)
- Highest elevation: 1,492 m (4,895 ft)

Population (2024-01-01)
  - Total: 632,864
  - Density: 120.166/km^{2} (311.229/sq mi)

GDP
  - Total: CZK 288.366 billion (€11.168 billion)
- ISO 3166 code: CZ-71
- Vehicle registration: M
- Website: www.kr-olomoucky.cz

Olomouc Region (Czech: Olomoucký kraj) is an administrative unit (Czech: kraj) of the Czech Republic, located in the north-western and central part of its historical region of Moravia (Morava) and in a small part of the historical region of Czech Silesia (České Slezsko). It is named for its capital Olomouc.

Olomouc region borders with the Moravian-Silesian Region (in the east), Zlín Region (in the south-east), South Moravian Region (in the south-west) and Pardubice Region (in the west). Furthermore, the region shares a 104 km long border with Poland (in the north).

== Administrative divisions ==
The Olomouc Region is divided into 5 districts:

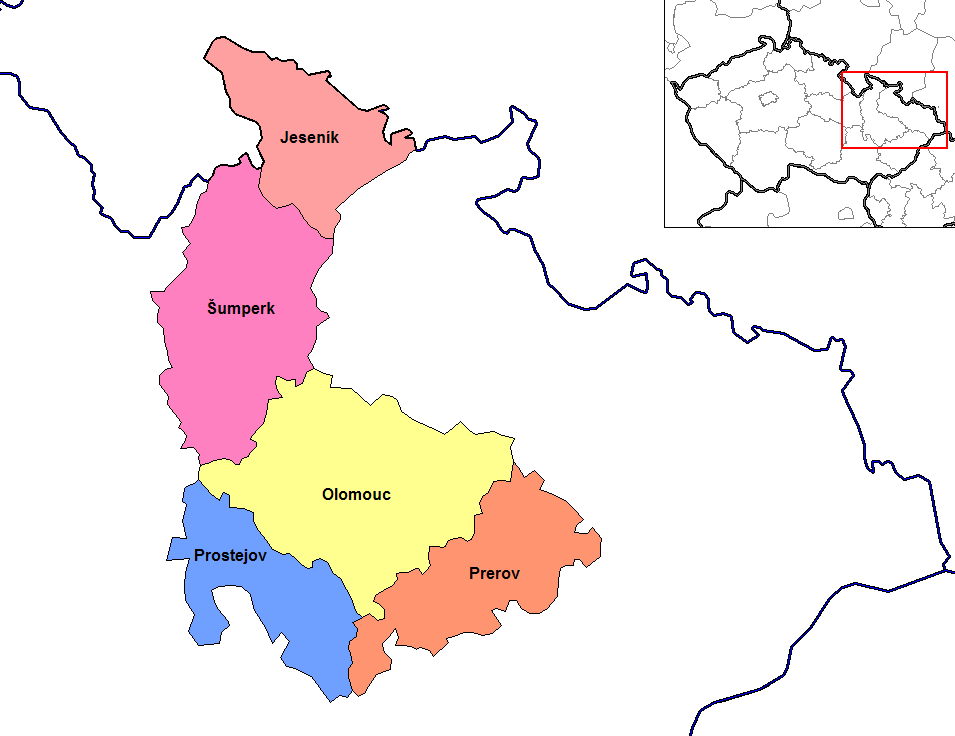
Districts of Olomouc Region

Jeseník; Olomouc	Přerov; Prostějov	Šumperk

On the territory of the region there are 13 administrative districts of municipalities with extended powers and 20 administrative districts of municipalities with authorized local authority.

== Population ==
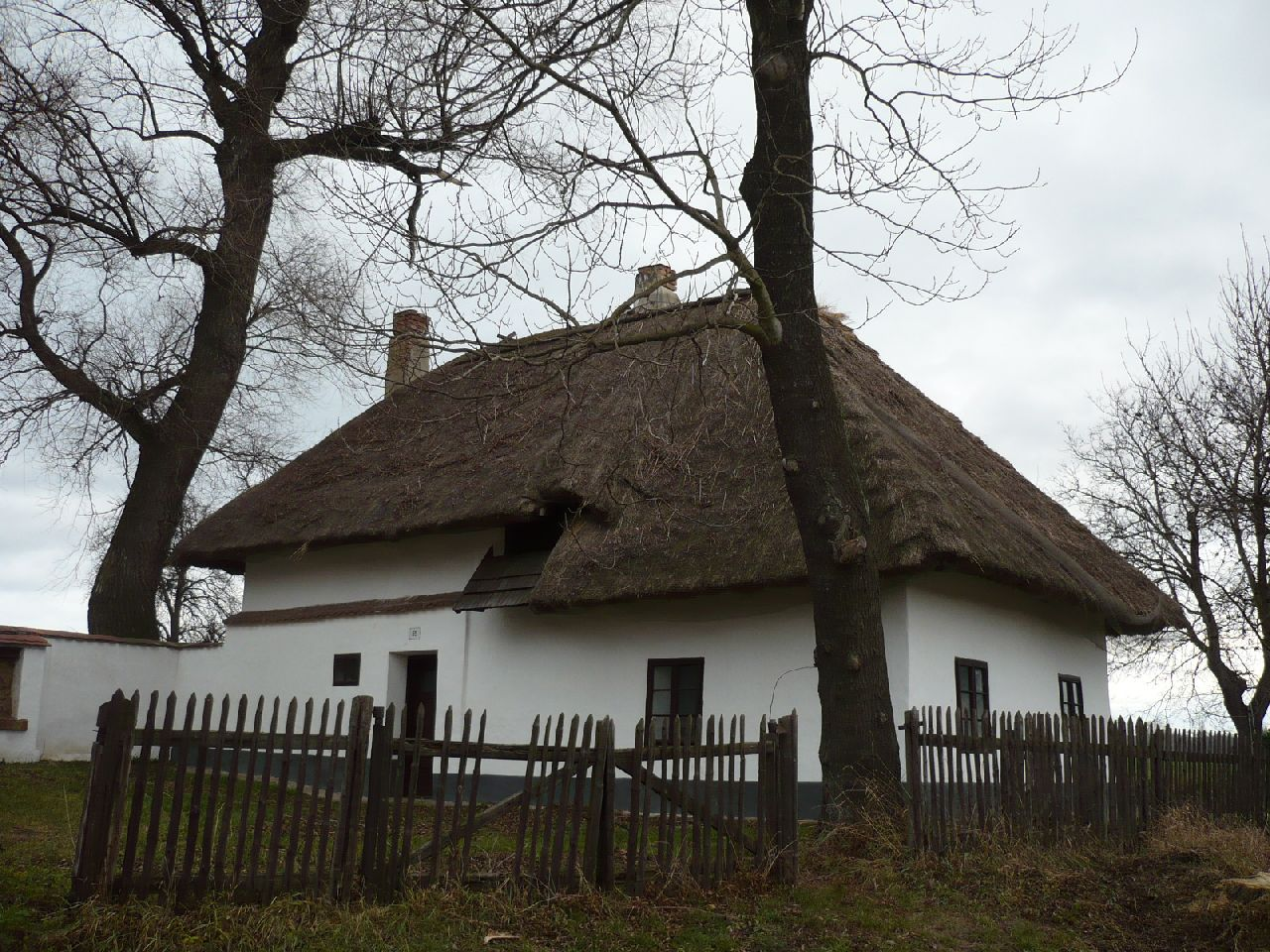
Example of vernacular architecture of Hanakia

In January 2024 the population of the Olomouc Region totalled 632,864 inhabitants. As of 2019, 50.3% of region's population lived in municipalities with more than 4,000. Out of 402 municipalities located in the region (including one military area), 30 had a status of town. Region's capital Olomouc is with approximately 100 thousand inhabitants the largest city. With 120.1 inhabitants per km^{2} the region was close to the national average of 135 inhabitants per km^{2}. There were, of course, differences within the region: the lowest population density was in the Jeseník District. In the long term, the population of the region has been aging. The average age of population in 2019 is 42.8, which is the 4th highest among regions in the Czech Republic.

=== Cities and towns ===
The table below provides the list of region's most populous cities and towns as of 1 January 2024:

Name	Population	Area (km^{2})	District
Olomouc	102,293	103	Olomouc District
Prostějov	43,563	39	Prostějov District
Přerov	41,661	59	Přerov District
Šumperk	24,969	28	Šumperk District
Hranice	18,024	50	Přerov District
Zábřeh	13,444	35	Šumperk District
Šternberk	13,264	49	Olomouc District
Uničov	11,151	48	Olomouc District
Jeseník	10,619	38	Jeseník District
Litovel	9,689	46	Olomouc District
Mohelnice	9,572	46	Šumperk District
Lipník nad Bečvou	7,961	31	Přerov District

Historical population

Year	Pop.	±%
1869	540,670	—
1880	583,621	+7.9%
1890	608,458	+4.3%
1900	632,806	+4.0%
1910	665,500	+5.2%

Year	Pop.	±%
1921	660,848	−0.7%
1930	698,075	+5.6%
1950	565,223	−19.0%
1961	600,425	+6.2%
1970	615,370	+2.5%

Year	Pop.	±%
1980	648,403	+5.4%
1991	647,341	−0.2%
2001	643,823	−0.5%
2011	628,428	−2.4%
2021	619,788	−1.4%

Source: Censuses

== Geography ==
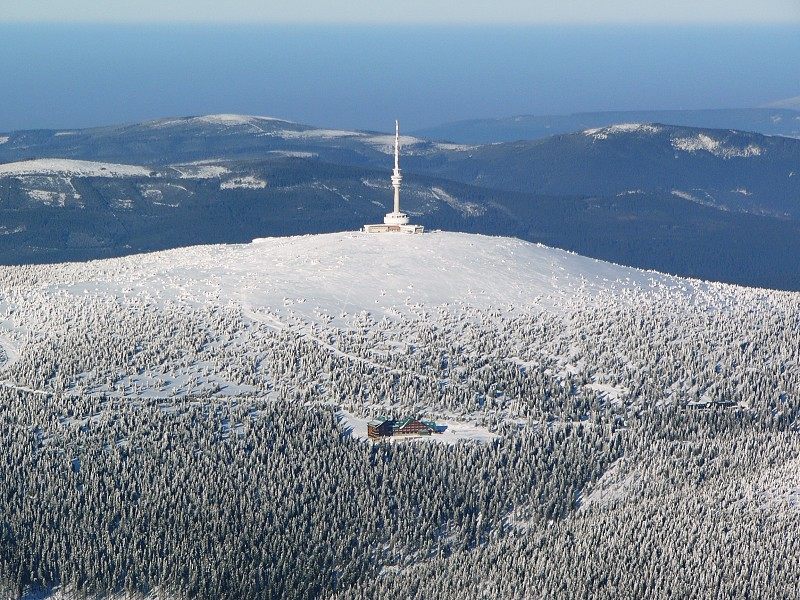
Aerial view of Praděd

The total area of the region amounts to 5,267 km^{2}, which is 6.7% of the entire area of the Czech Republic. The northern part of the region is of mountainous nature. The Hrubý Jeseník mountains are located here, including Praděd, which is the highest point of the region (1,492 m above sea level). The southern part of the region consists of the Hanakian lowland. The lowest point of the region is situated on the water level of the Morava River near to Kojetín in the Přerov District (190 m above sea level). The Morava flows through the region and the majority of the region's territory belongs to Morava's drainage basin. A small northern part of the region belongs to the drainage basin of Oder River, which flows to the Baltic Sea. The Olomouc Region offers a great variety of natural points of interest. Protected landscape area of Jeseníky offers a number of scenic places such as the largest Moravian peatbog Rejvíz and the 45m high Vysoký Waterfall. Another scenic place is Dlouhé stráně water reservoir situated on the top of a hill. Protected landscape area Litovelské Pomoraví offers floodplain forests with many endangered species of plants and animals. Finally, many caves can be found in the region: Javoříčko Caves, Mladeč Caves and Zbrašov aragonite caves (Czech: Zbrašovské jeskyně).

== Economy ==
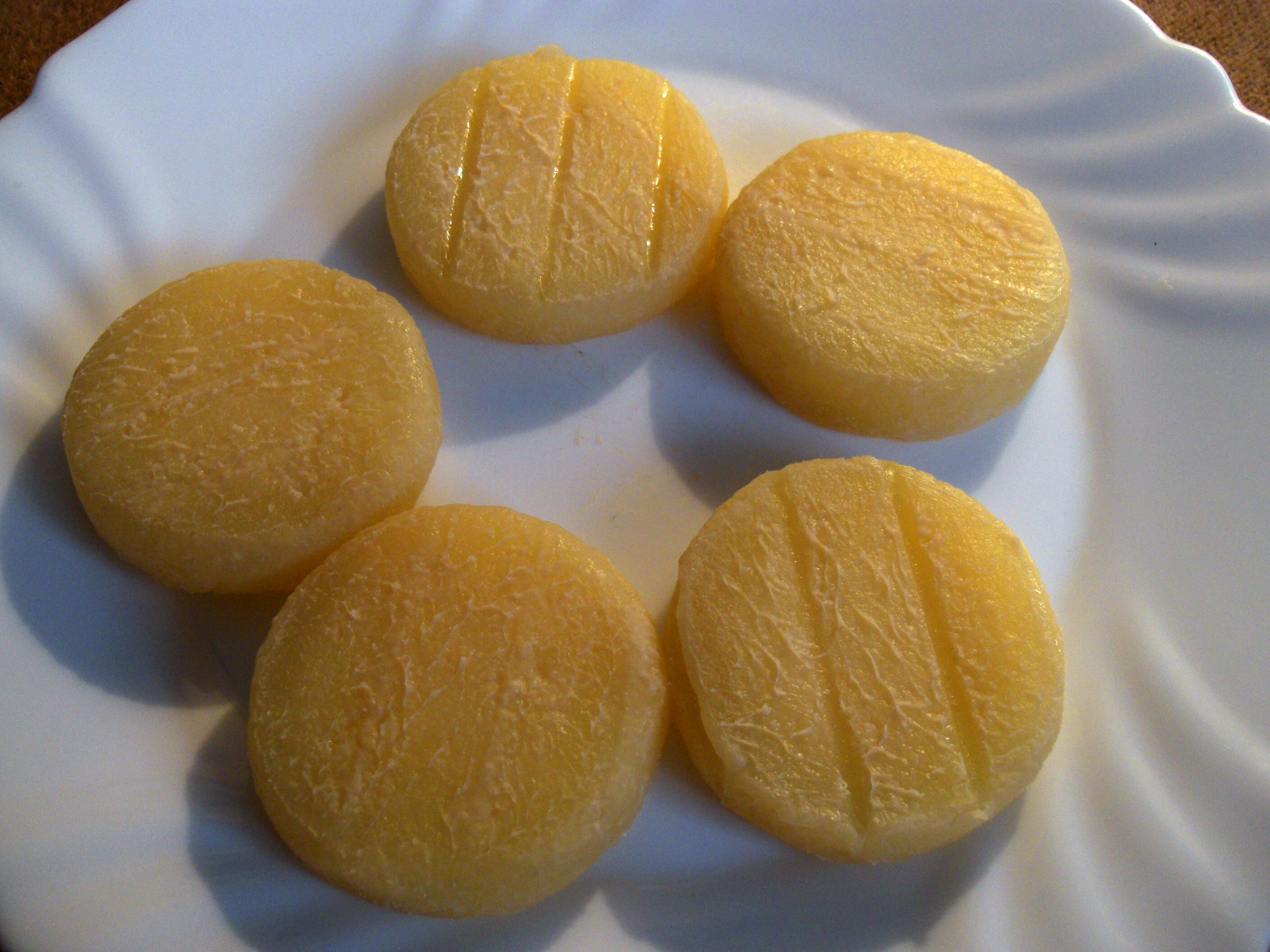
Olomoucké syrečky, a ripened soft cheese made in Loštice

The region's economy focuses on traditional agriculture, processing industry and services. Conditions for further development of the region are its attractive location, transport accessibility, developed infrastructure, enough qualified labour force and entry of foreign investors. In 2011, the total economically active population of the Olomouc Region was 307.2 thousand people, of which 283.9 thousand were employed and 23.3 thousand unemployed. The unemployment rate in 12/2022 was 3,6%. The Olomouc Region is an industrial area with developed services. The economy of the Hanakian districts is more stable and diverse than the economy of the Jeseník District and northern part of the Šumperk District. The latter two districts belong to economically weaker regions due to their position, transport accessibility and disturbance of social and economic life after the Second World War (displacement of German population). The gross domestic product of the Olomouc Region amounted to 4.7% of the nation GDP in 2021. The GDP per capita of the region reaches 79.4% of the national average. The average monthly wage of employees in the region reached 36,481 CZK (EUR 1520) in 3Q/2022. Significant sectors of the region's economy are agriculture, food industry, textile and clothing industry, manufacture of machinery, optics and optical equipment. In 2011, there were 138,970 businesses, organisations and entrepreneurs based in the region. Most of them were private entrepreneurs registered according to the trade law (76.6%) and business companies (8.4%). 157 industrial enterprises had 100 or more employees, employing in total 41,222 employees.

=== Agriculture ===
The share of arable land was 39.4% in 2011 but was showing a decreasing trend over past years while the share of non-agricultural land has been increasing and reached 46.9% in 2011. Southern and central parts of the region belong to areas with the most fertile land. Crop yields (barley, wheat, rape and industrial sugar beet) reach the highest amounts of the entire country.

=== Transport ===
Transport accessibility of the region is provided by 3,582 km of roads, of which only 12.3% are first class roads. The motorways with two lanes connect Olomouc with Brno (I/46), Ostrava (I/35 followed by D1) and the Pardubice Region (I/35). Once finished, the d1 motorway will connect Brno with Ostrava and will cross the southern part of Olomouc Region. There is 601 km of railways in the region. Important rail junctions are in Olomouc and Přerov. The railway network is spread equally all over the Region´s territory. Road network is denser in the southern flat part of the Region. Near to the city of Olomouc there is an airport for small airliners, which obtained status of an international airport.

=== Tourism ===
The Olomouc Region belongs to regions with the smallest number of accommodation establishments. In 2009 there were 338 collective accommodation establishments. These were placed primarily in the Jeseník District and the Šumperk District that are most visited by tourists.

== Quality of life ==
In 2011, 14,347 crimes were committed in the region, of which 6,744 (47%) were solved. Compared to other regions of the Czech Republic, the environment of Olomouc Region can be marked as relatively less damaged. The values of specific emissions do not reach the average national values. Mountain areas and foothills have excellent air quality and are important sources of drinking water.

=== Health care ===
In 2011 the region counted 9 hospitals, 16 specialized therapeutic institutions and other health establishments by 2,897 physicians and 6,466 paramedical workers. Health care is provided also in many spa establishments that are placed all over the region. Well known spas are in Jeseník, Velké Losiny, Teplice nad Bečvou, Slatinice, Skalka, etc.

=== Education ===
In 2011, the network of school establishments consists of 367 nursery schools, 369 basic schools, 20 grammar schools, 81 programmes vocational training and 8 higher schools. The second oldest university in the Czech Republic, the Palacký University (Czech: Univerzita Palackého), is situated in Olomouc. It is attended by over 23,000 students.

== Places of interest ==
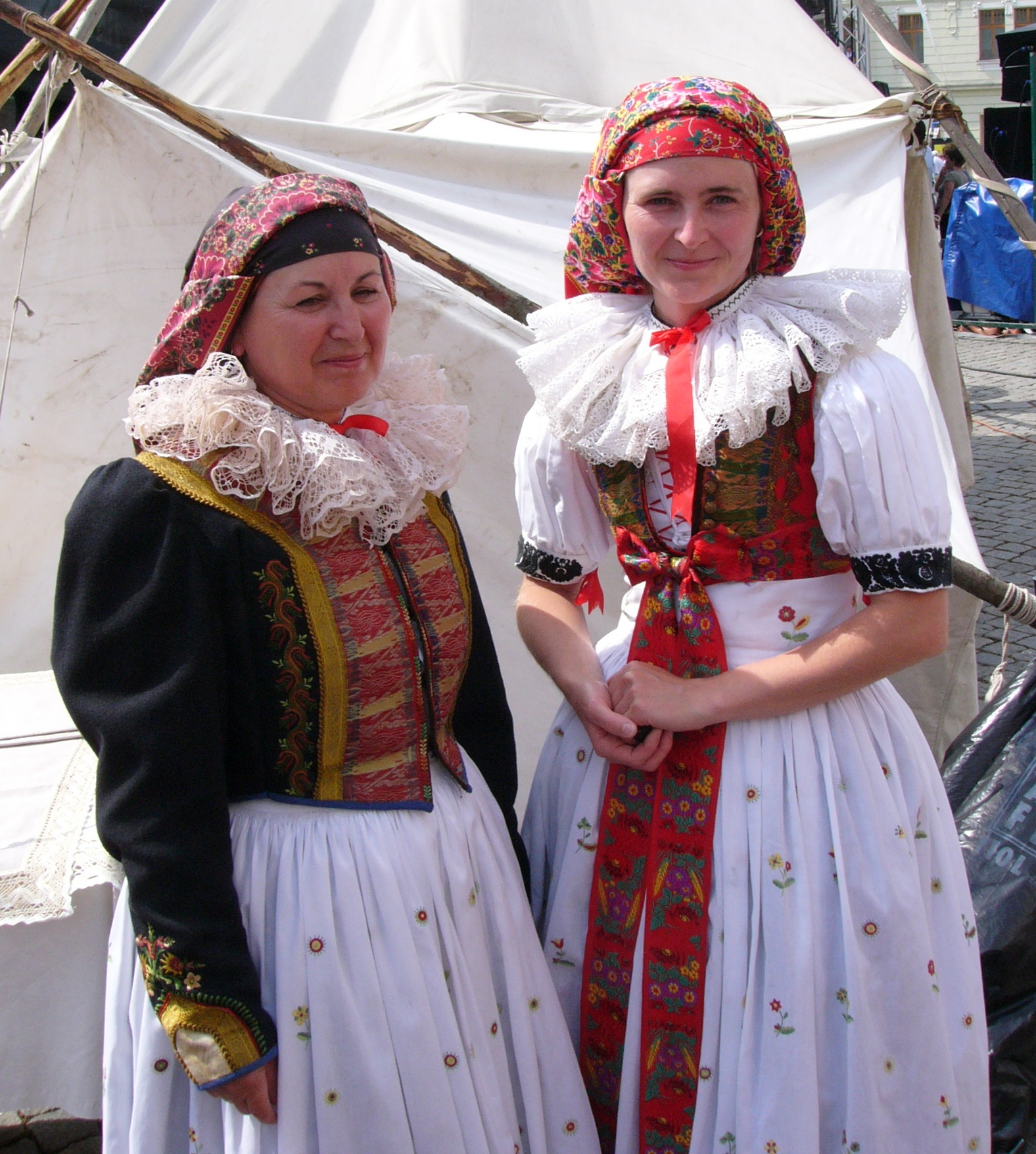
National costume of Haná

- Bouzov Castle;
- Hanáregion with its folkways, folklore shows and festivals that are organised in Náměšť na Hané, Prostějov, Kojetín, etc.
- Helfštýn Castle;
- Jánský Vrch Castle
- Náměšť na Hané Castle;
- Olomouc with a large urban conservation area preserving a large set of buildings that are important for their historical, architectonic and artistic value;
- Sovinec Castle;
- Svatý Kopeček with the pilgrimage Church of the Visitation of the Virgin Mary
- Šternberk Castle;
- Tovačov Castle;
- Úsov Castle;
- Velké Losiny Castle, Paper Mill at Velké Losiny, Velké Losiny spa;

== International relations ==
Olomouc Region cooperates with:

- Baranya County, Hungary
- Fujian, China
- Ganja, Azerbaijan
- Green River Area, United States
- Kostroma Oblast, Russia
- Opole Voivodeship, Poland
- Province of Reggio Emilia, Italy
- Vojvodina, Serbia
- Würzburg District, Germany
- Yunnan, China

== Gallery ==
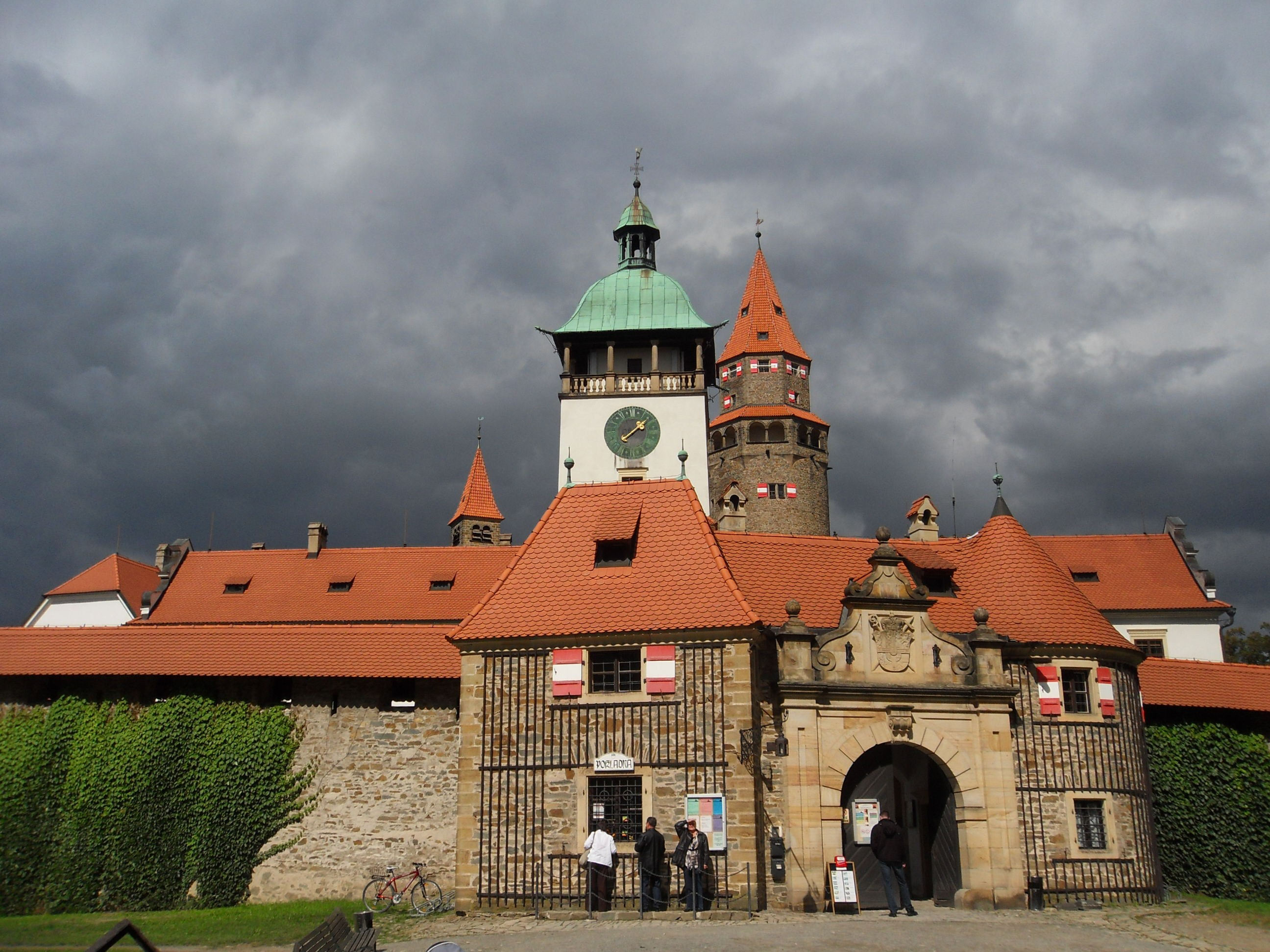
Bouzov Castle

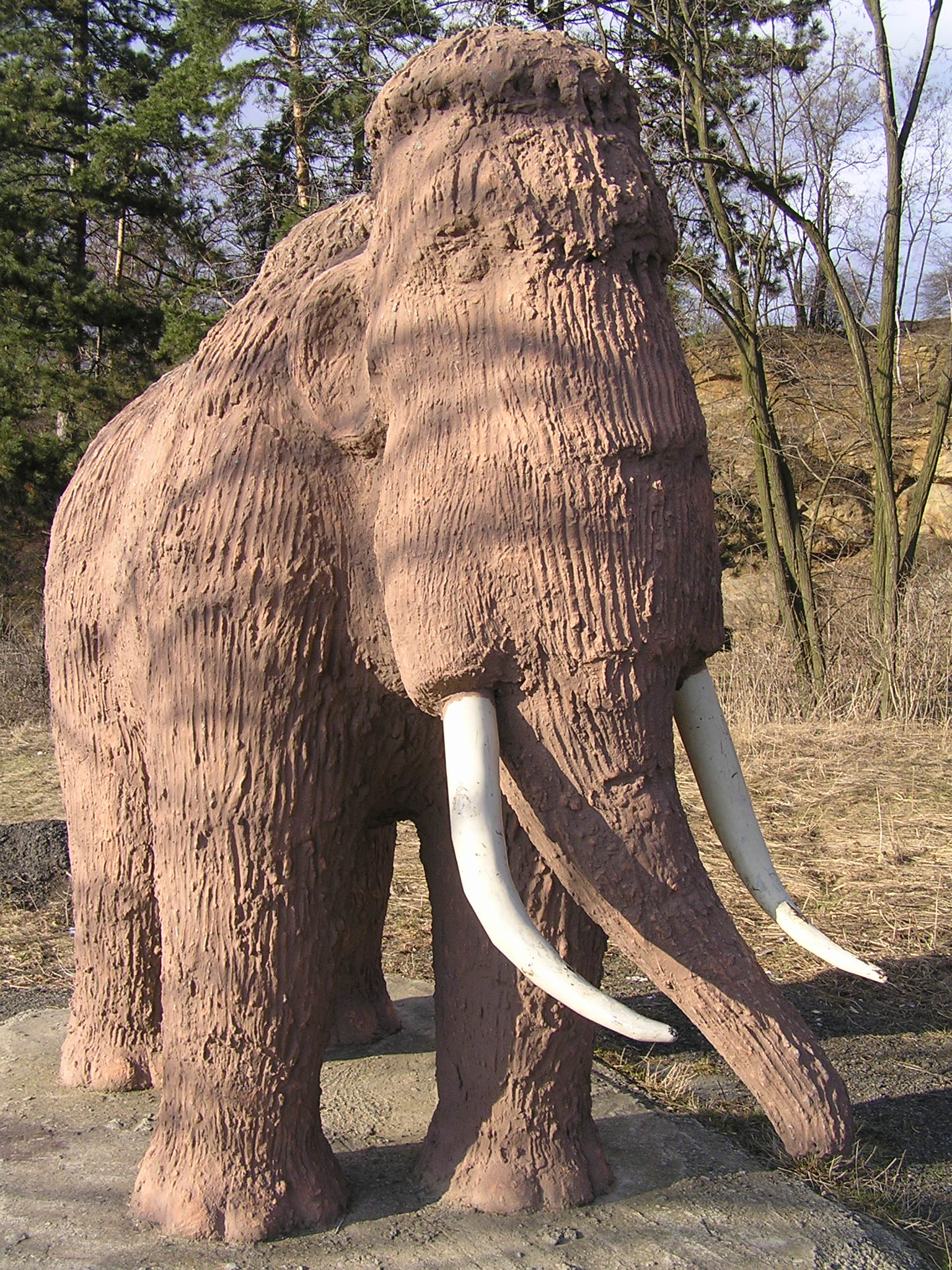
Čekyňský kopec, statue of a mammoth

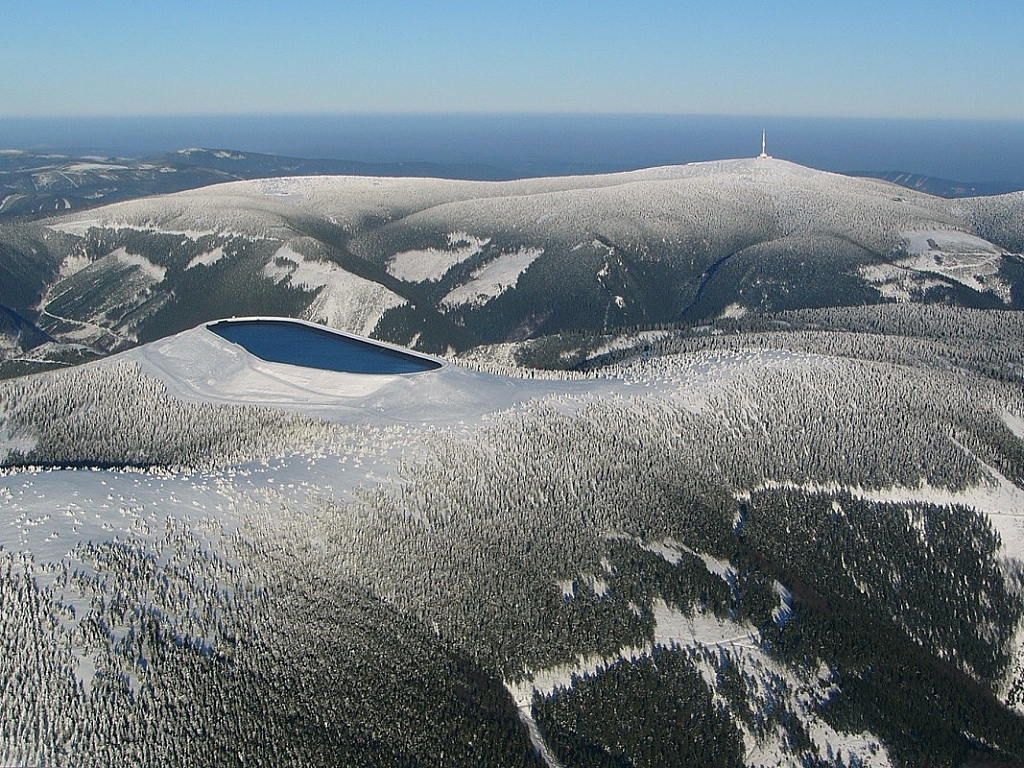
Dlouhé stráně Hydro Power Plant

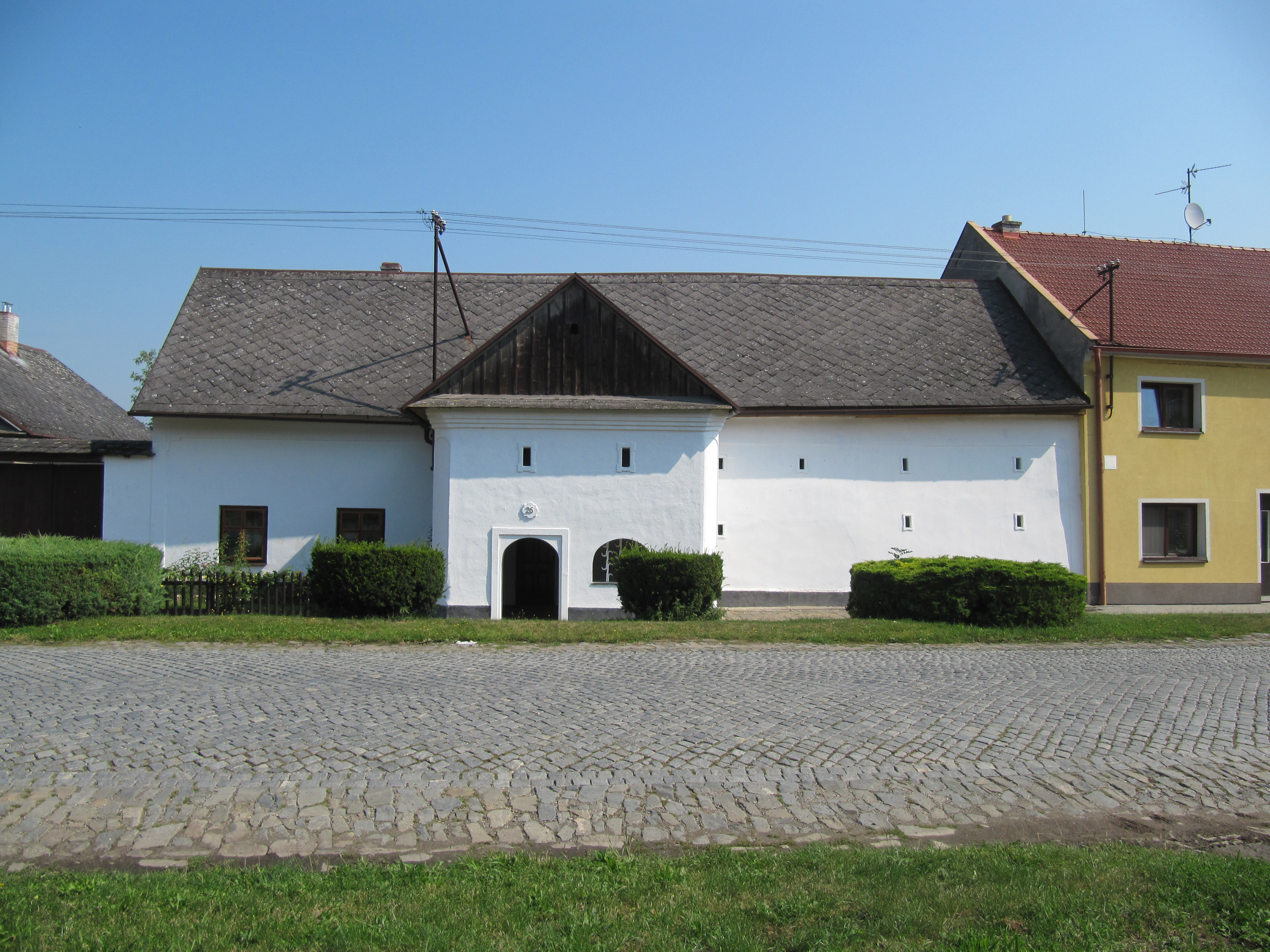
Hanakian vernacular architecture in Příkazy

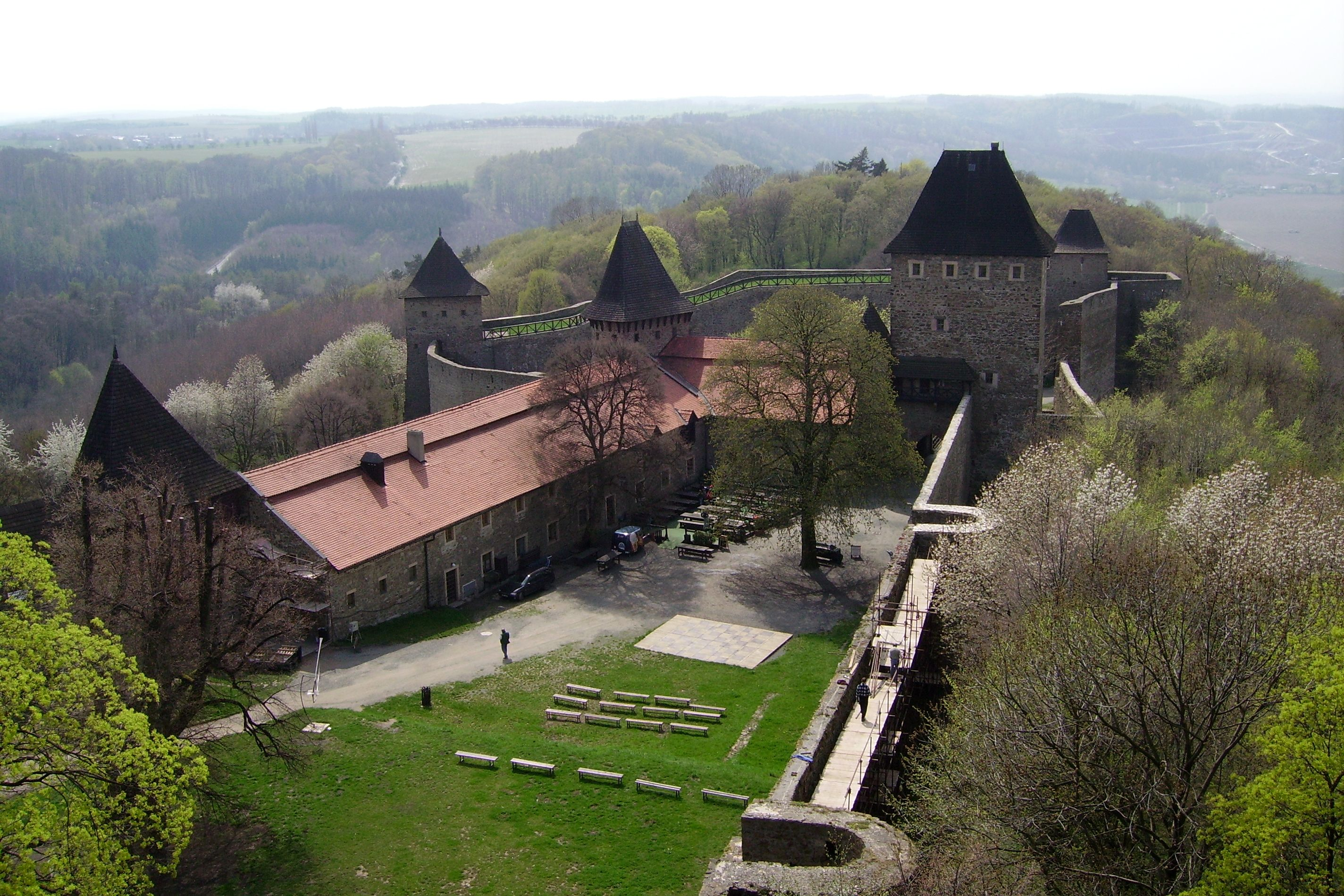
Helfštýn castle

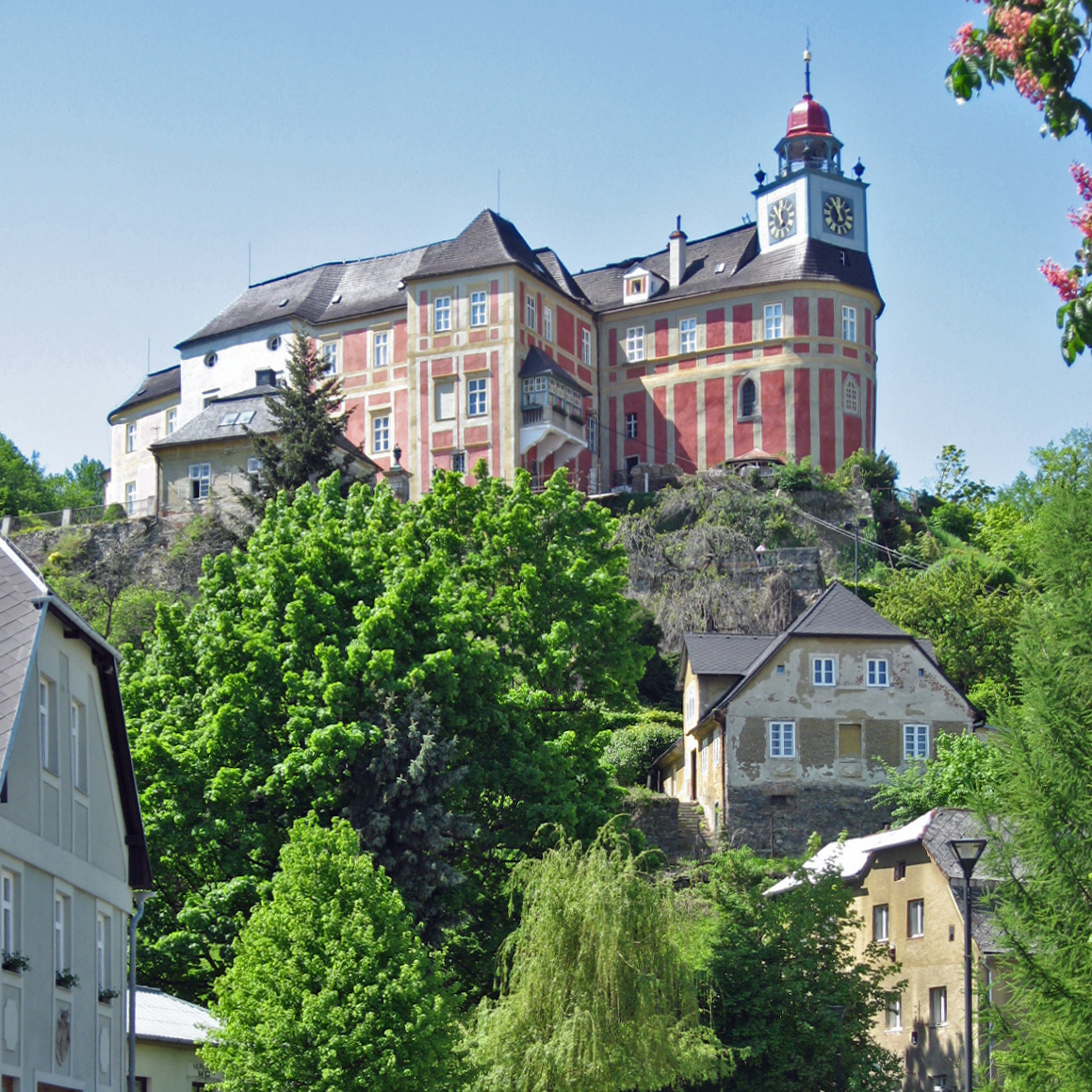
Jánský vrch château

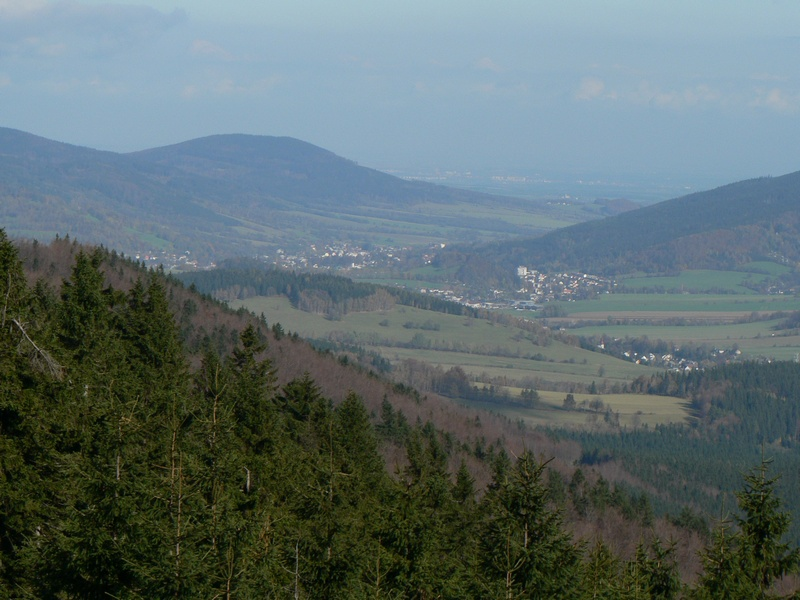
A view at Jeseník from Červenohorské sedlo

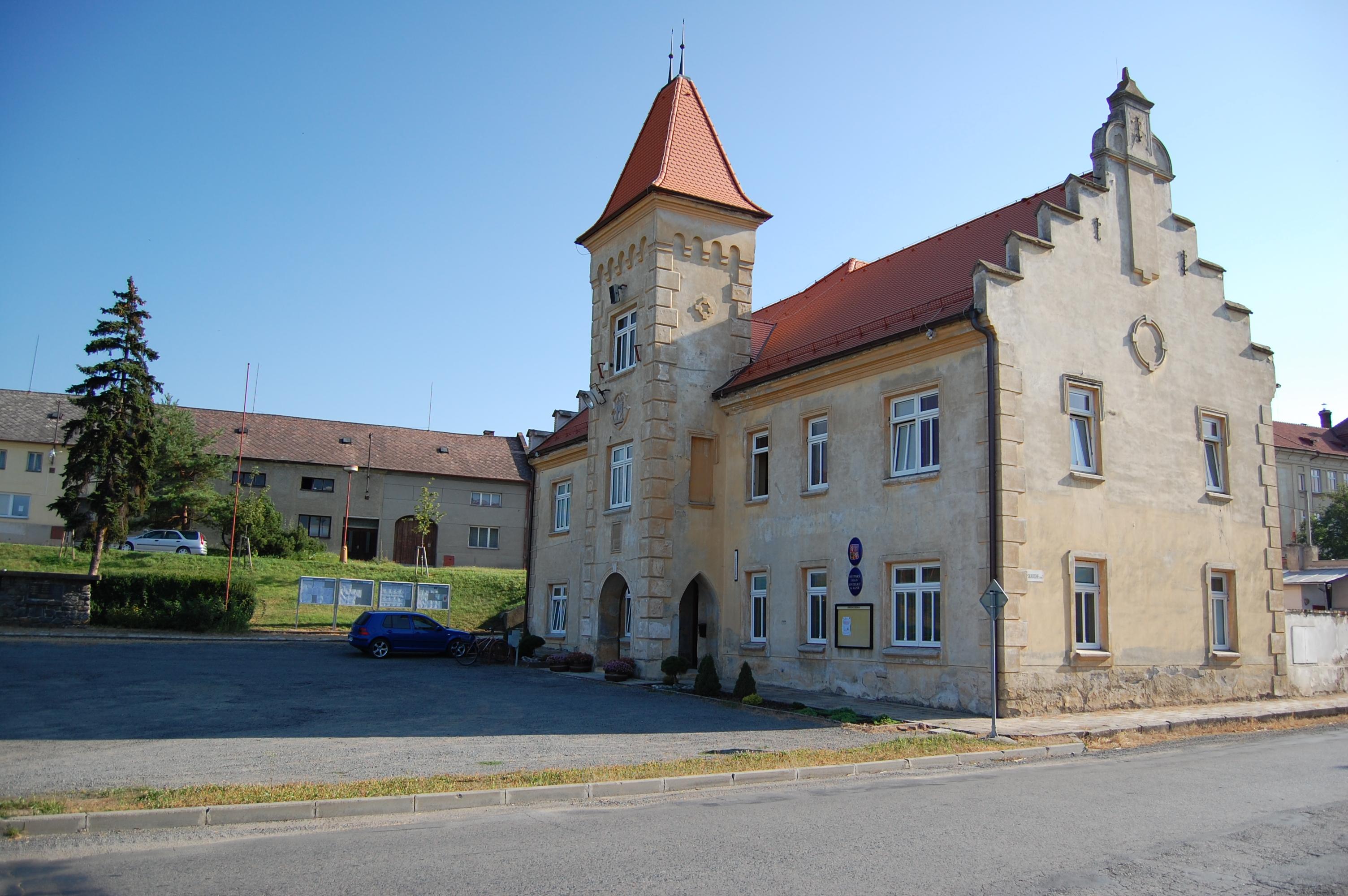
Kostelec na Hané, town hall

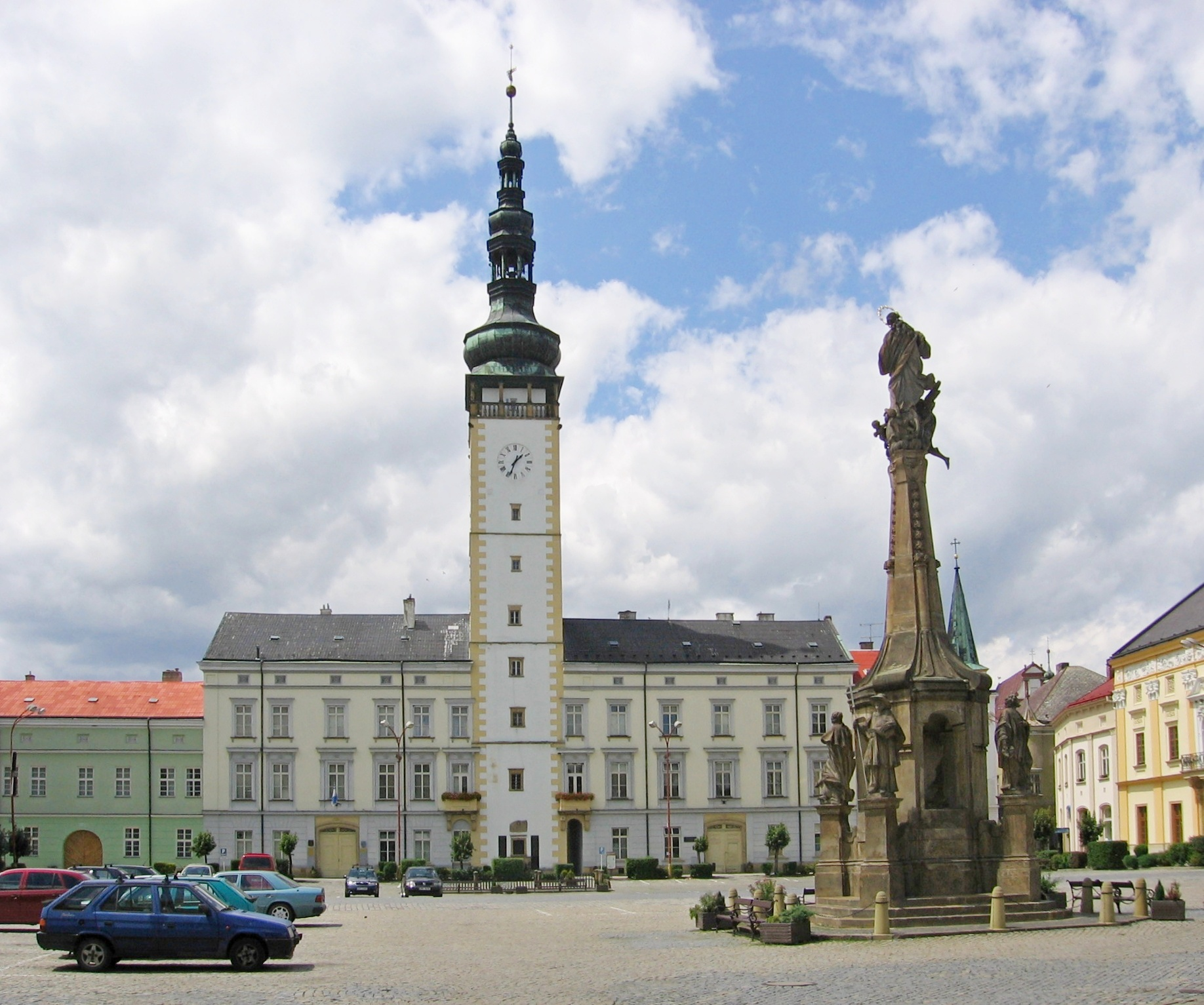
Litovel

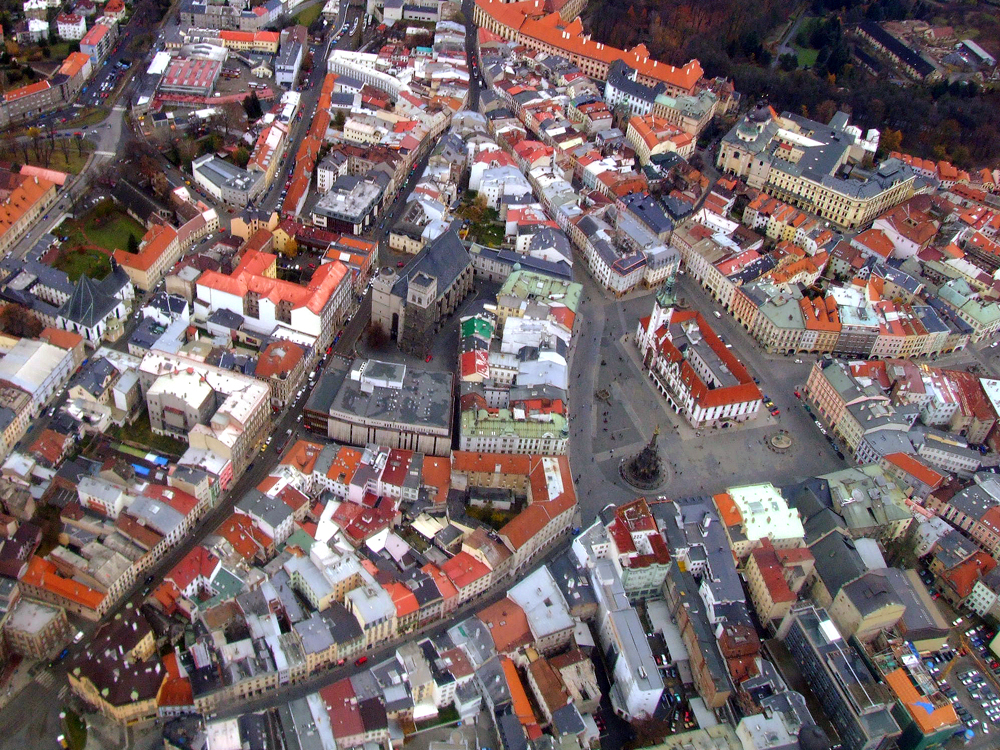
City center of Olomouc

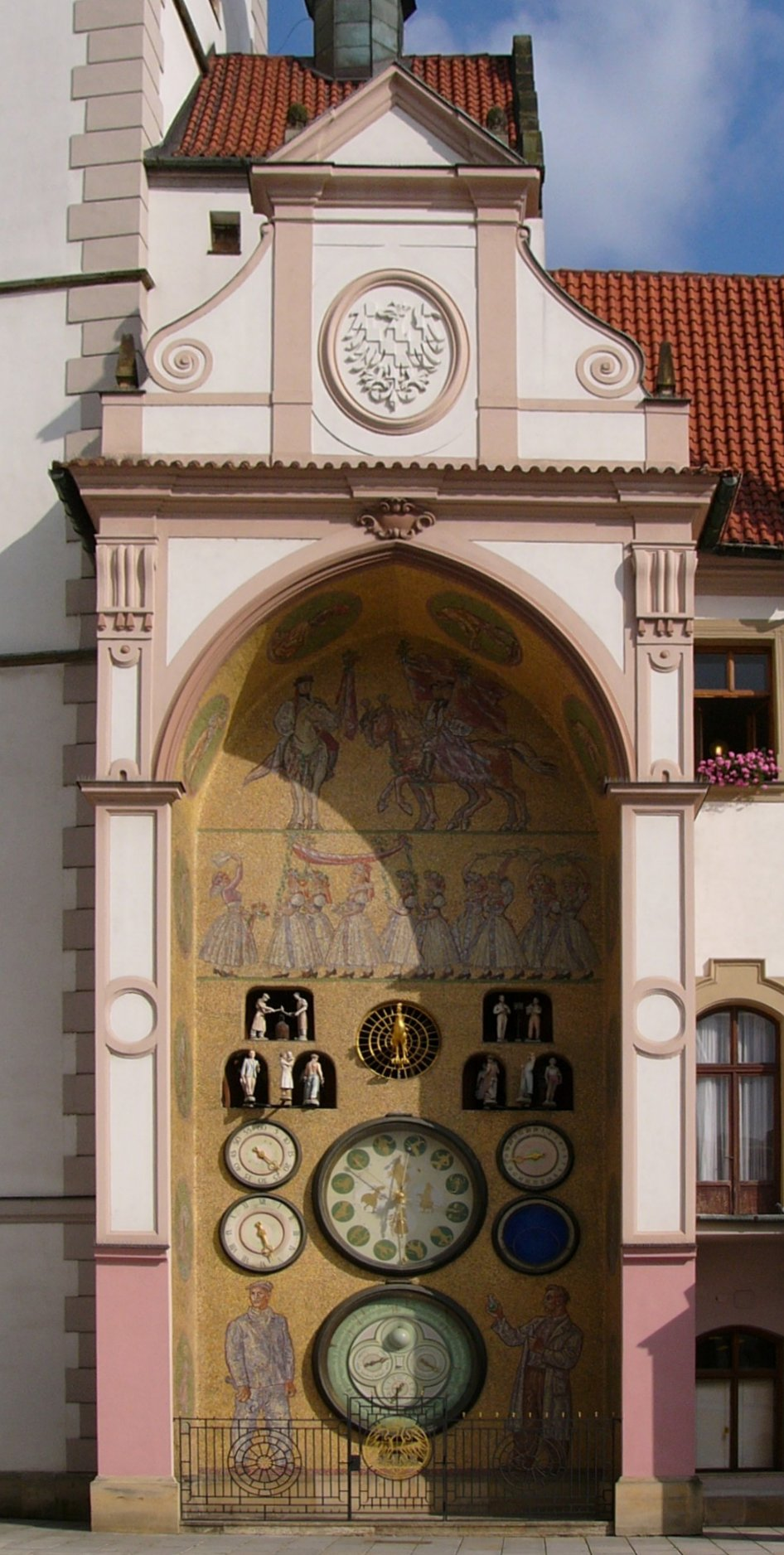
Astronomical clock at town hall in Olomouc

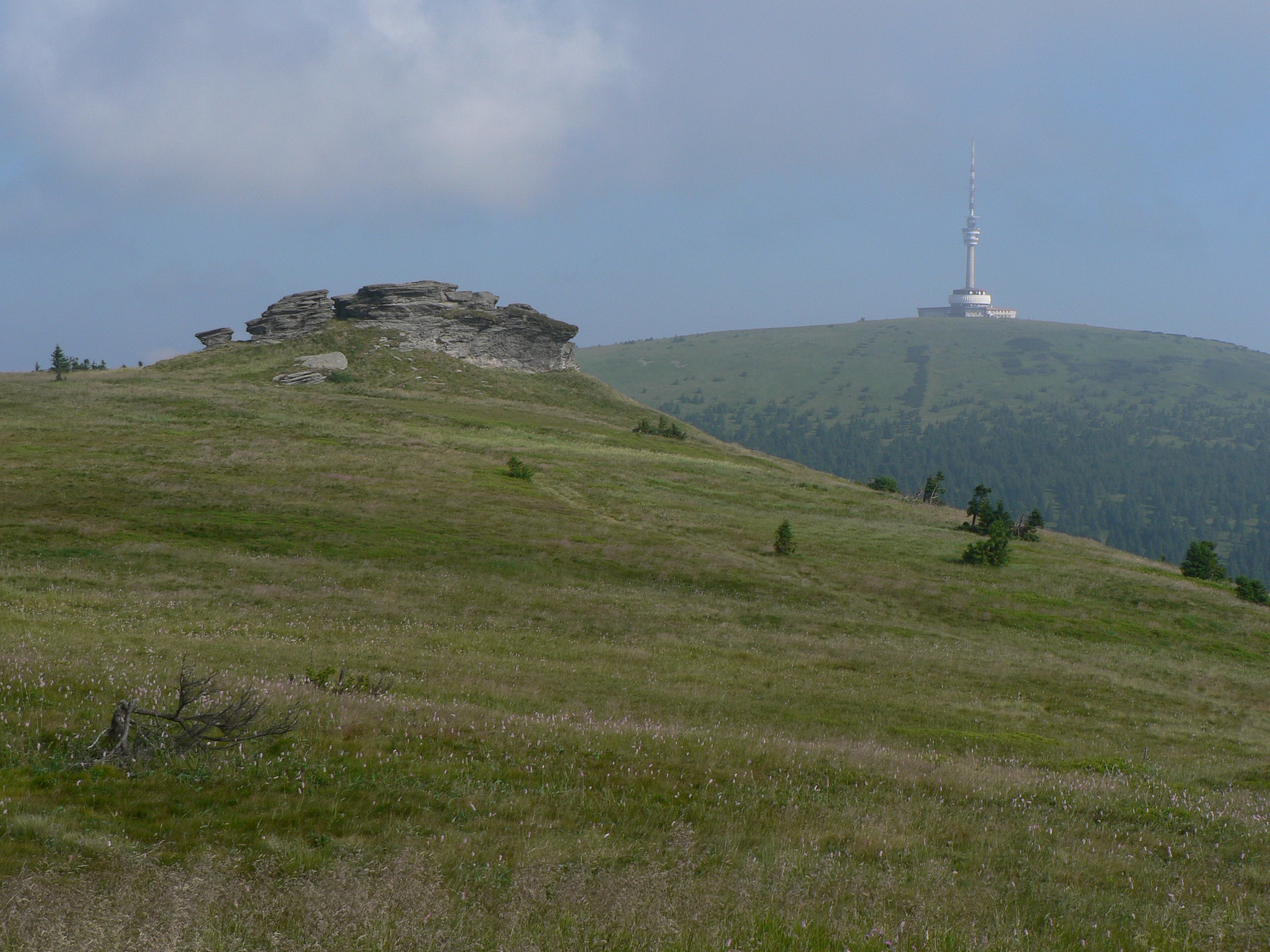
Petrovy kameny and Praděd

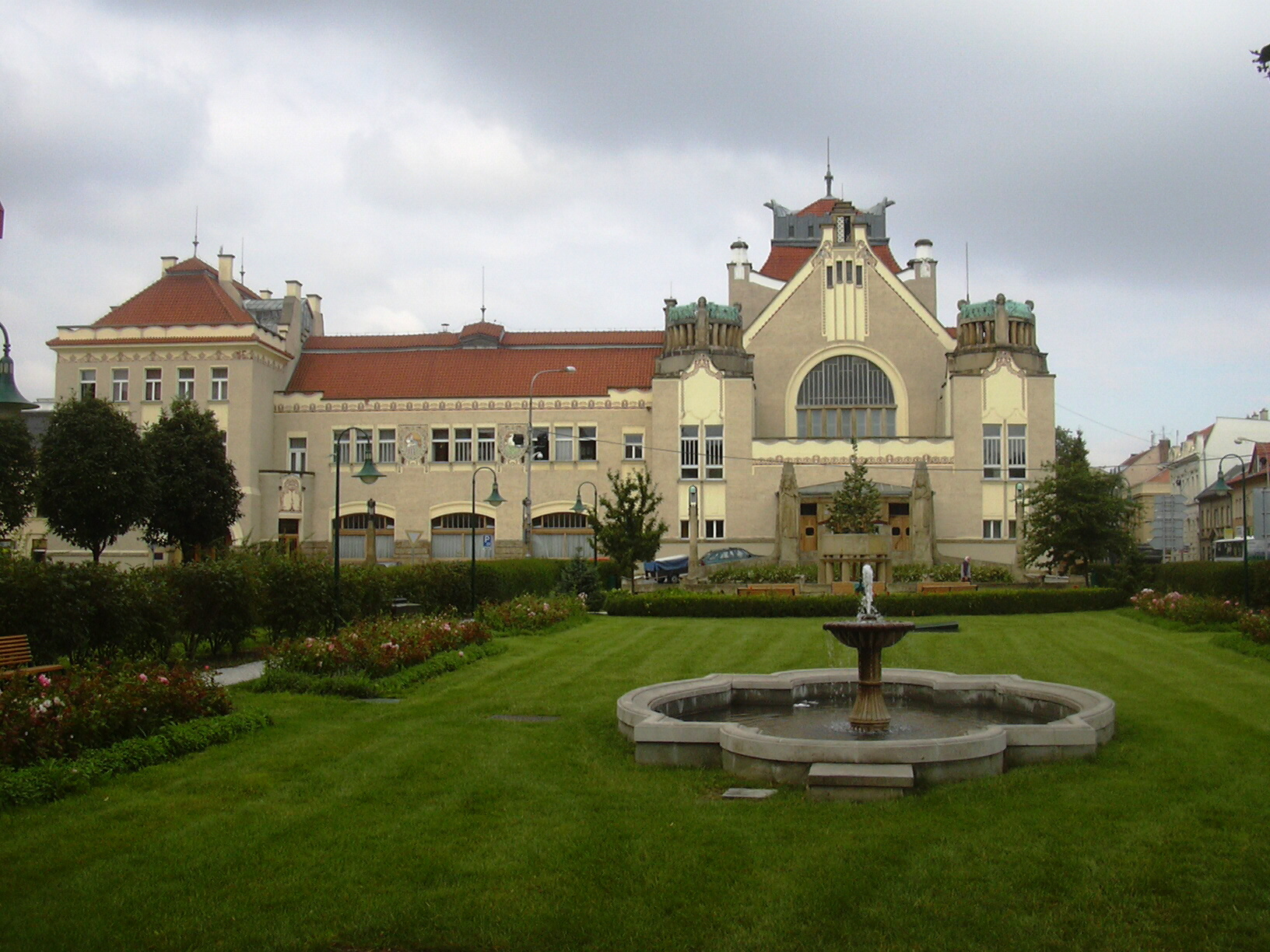
National House in Prostějov

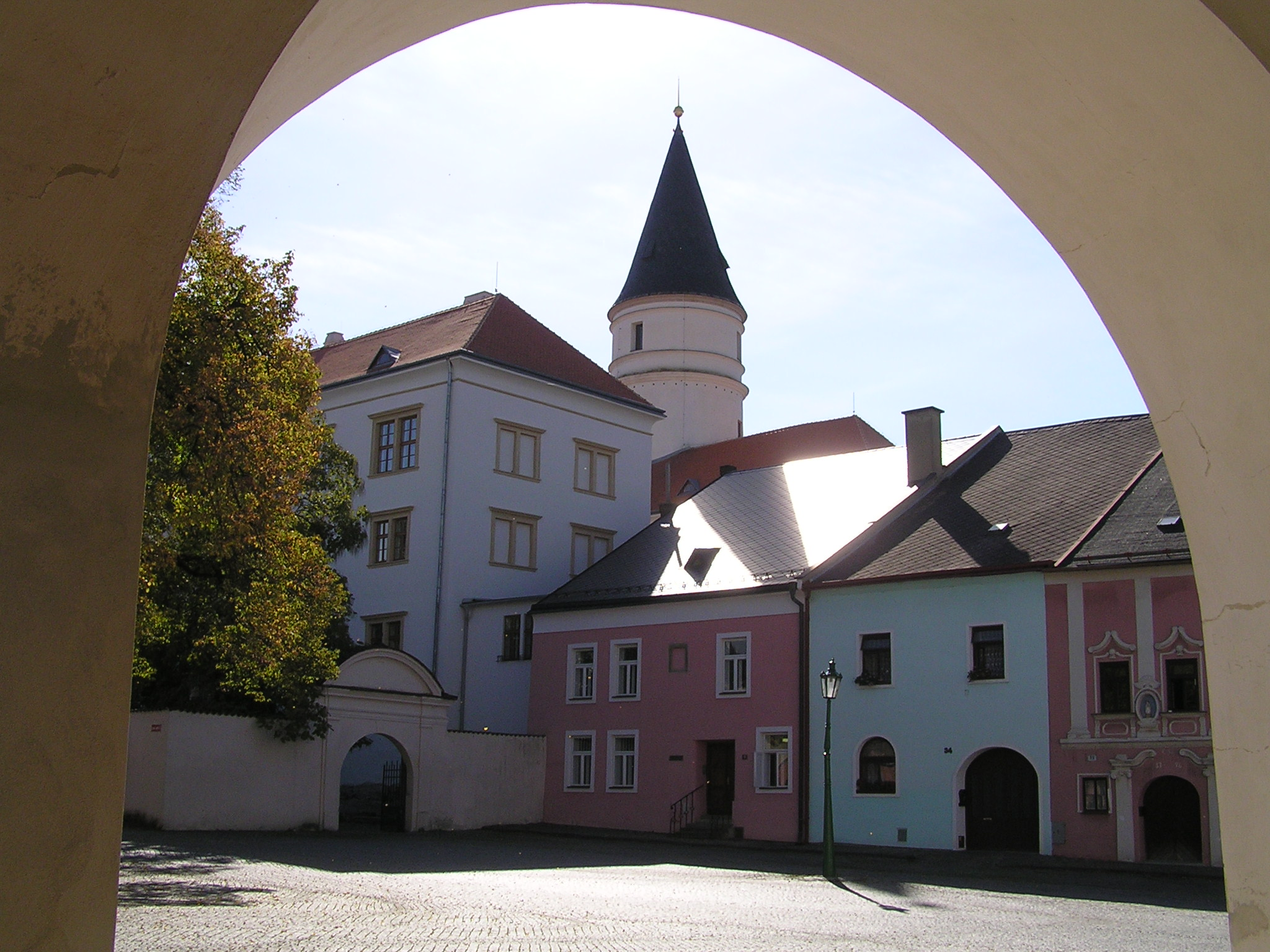
Přerov

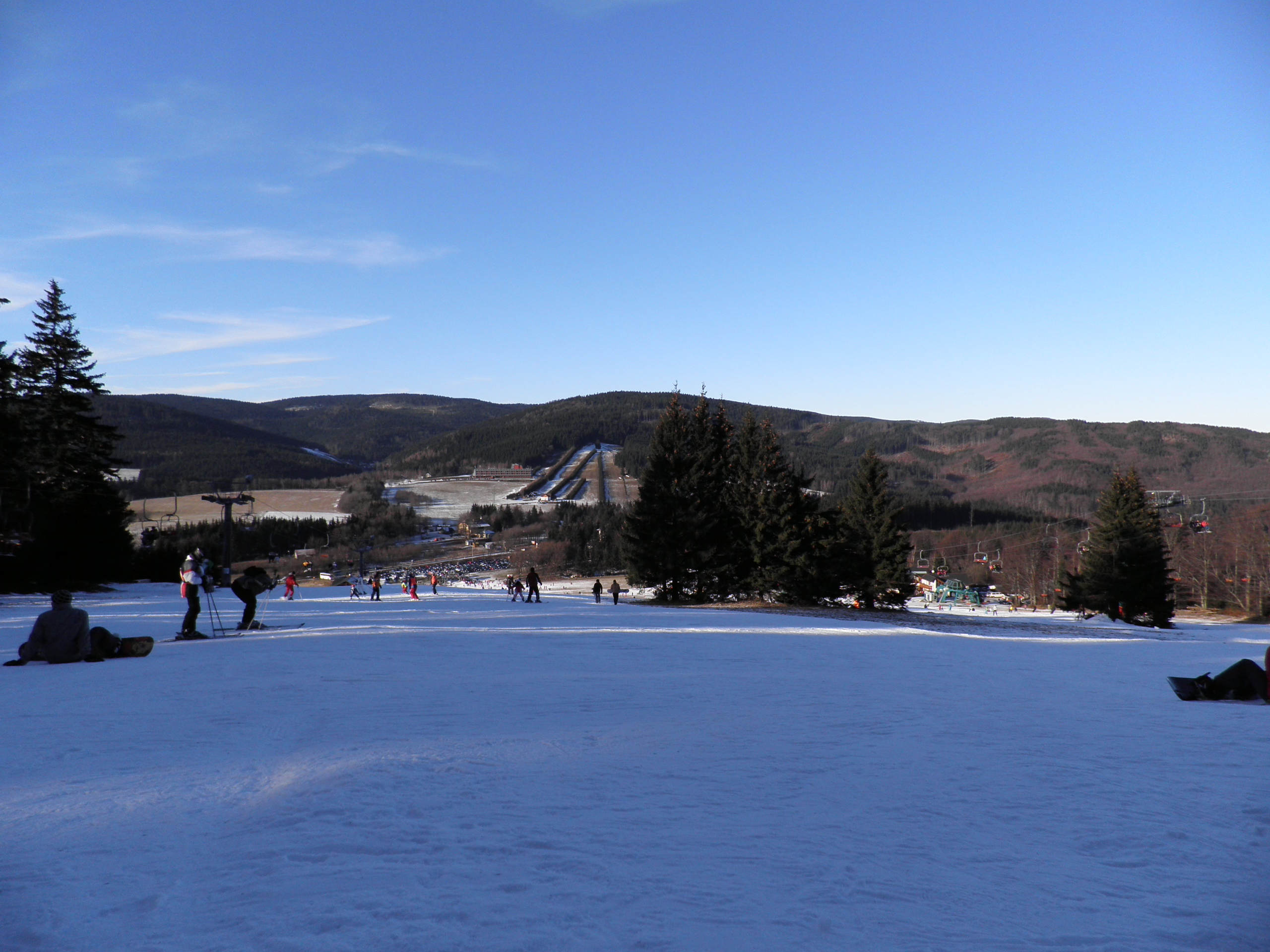
Ramzová

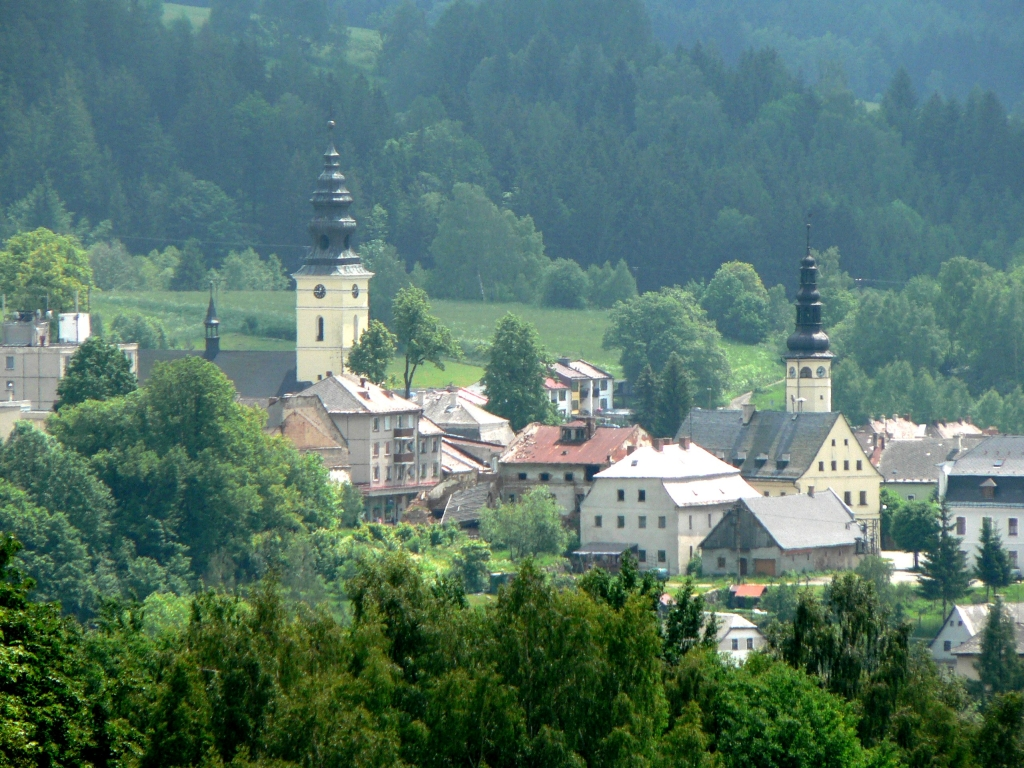
Staré Město

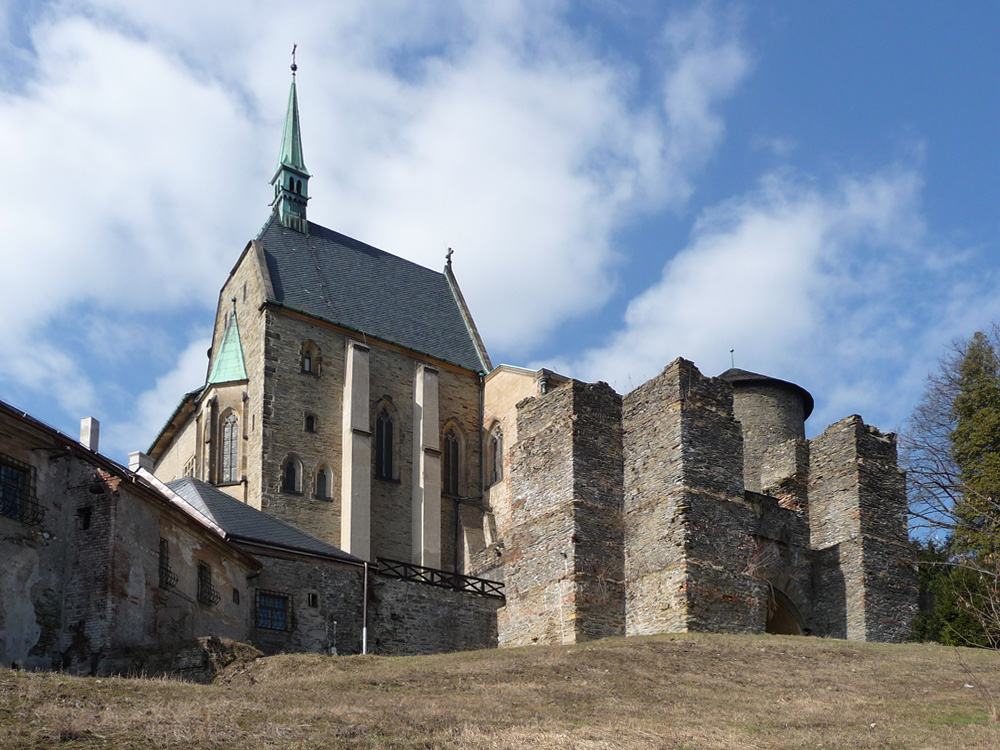
Šternberk castle

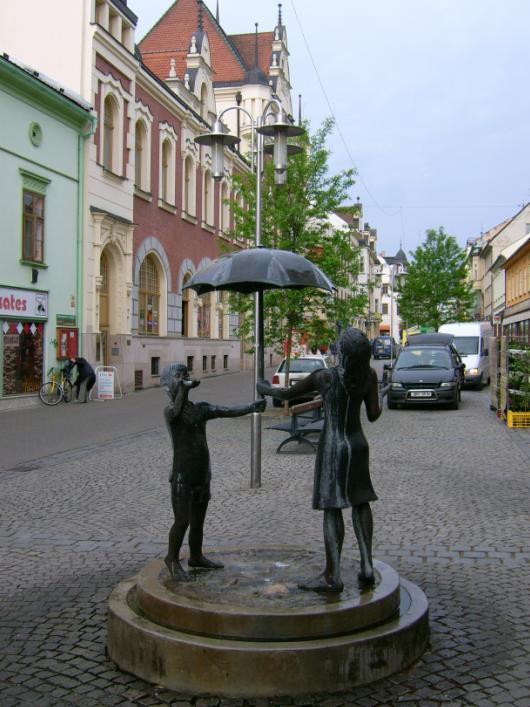
Šumperk

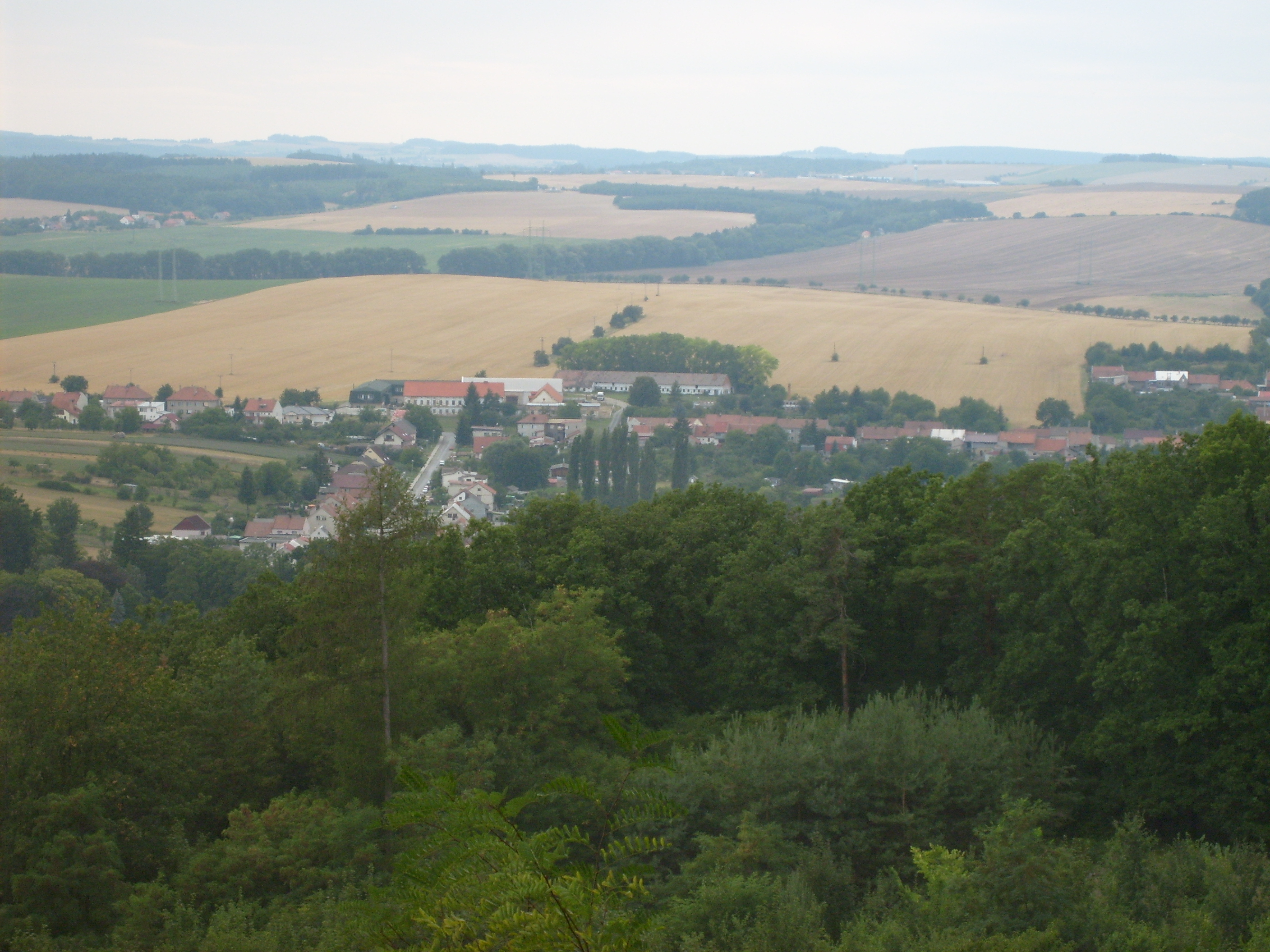
A view from Velký Kosíř mountain

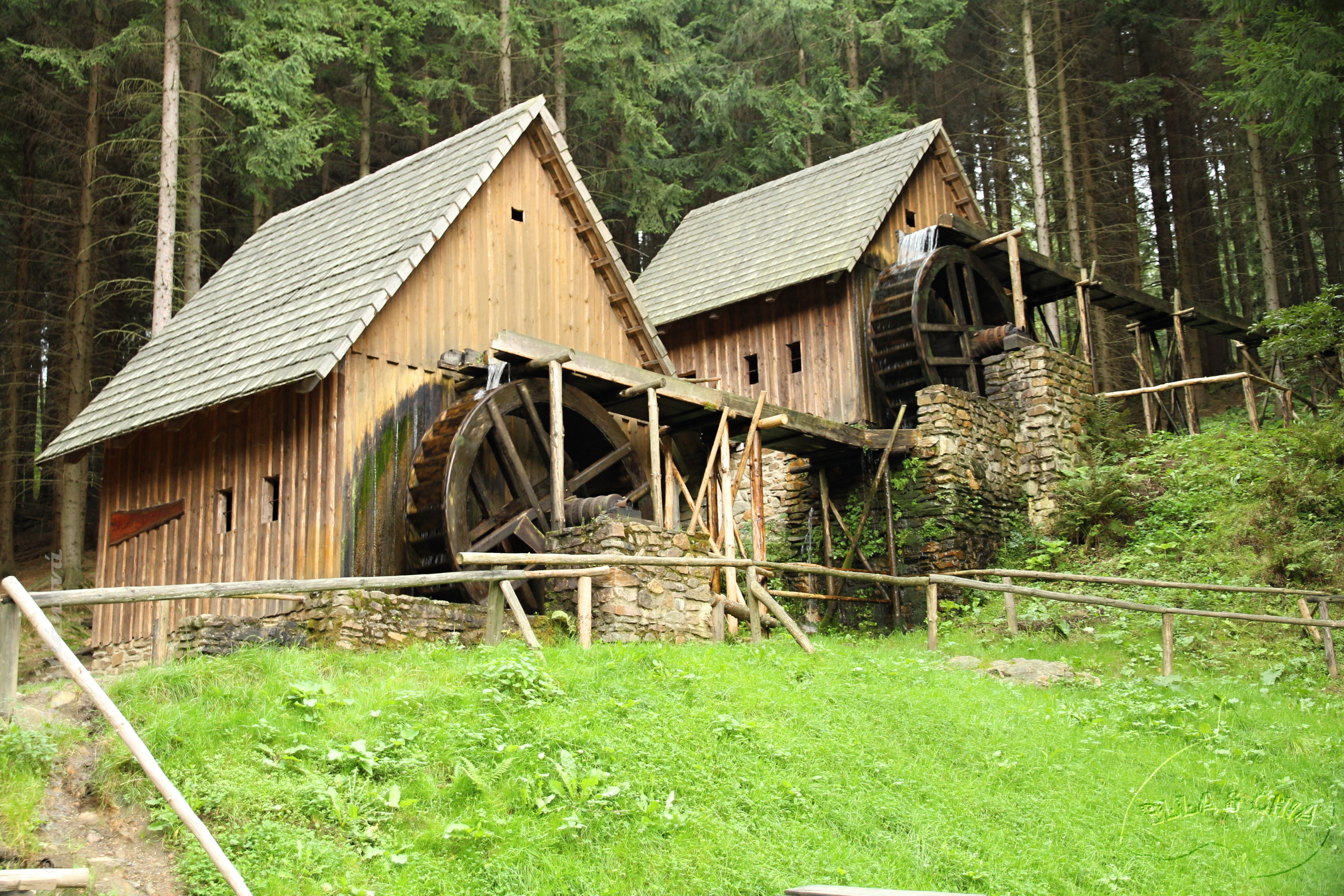
Mills in Zlaté Hory
