= Haná =

Ethnographic region in central Moravia, Czech Republic

Coordinates: 49°29′N 17°15′E

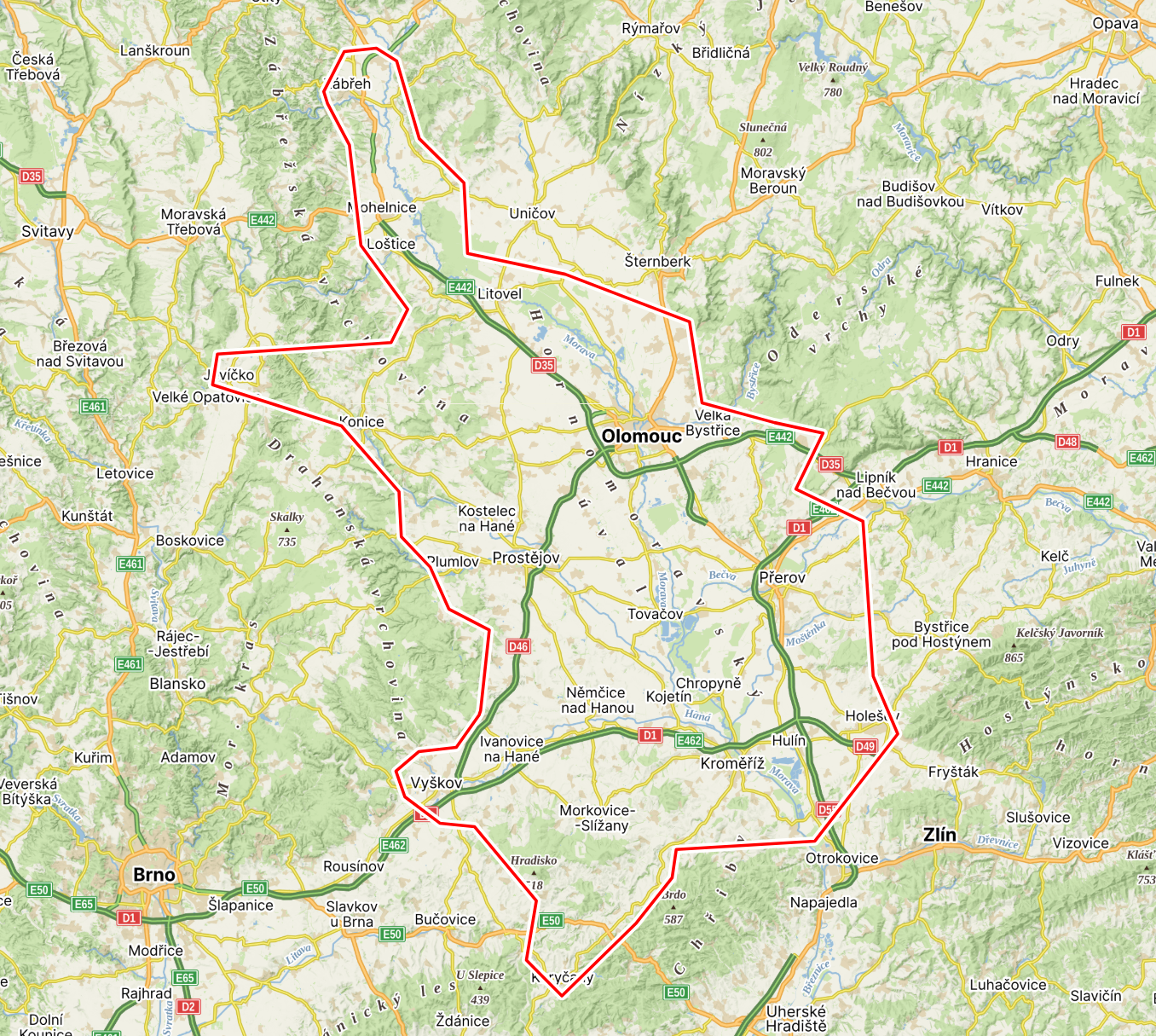
Map of Haná with approximately defined boundaries

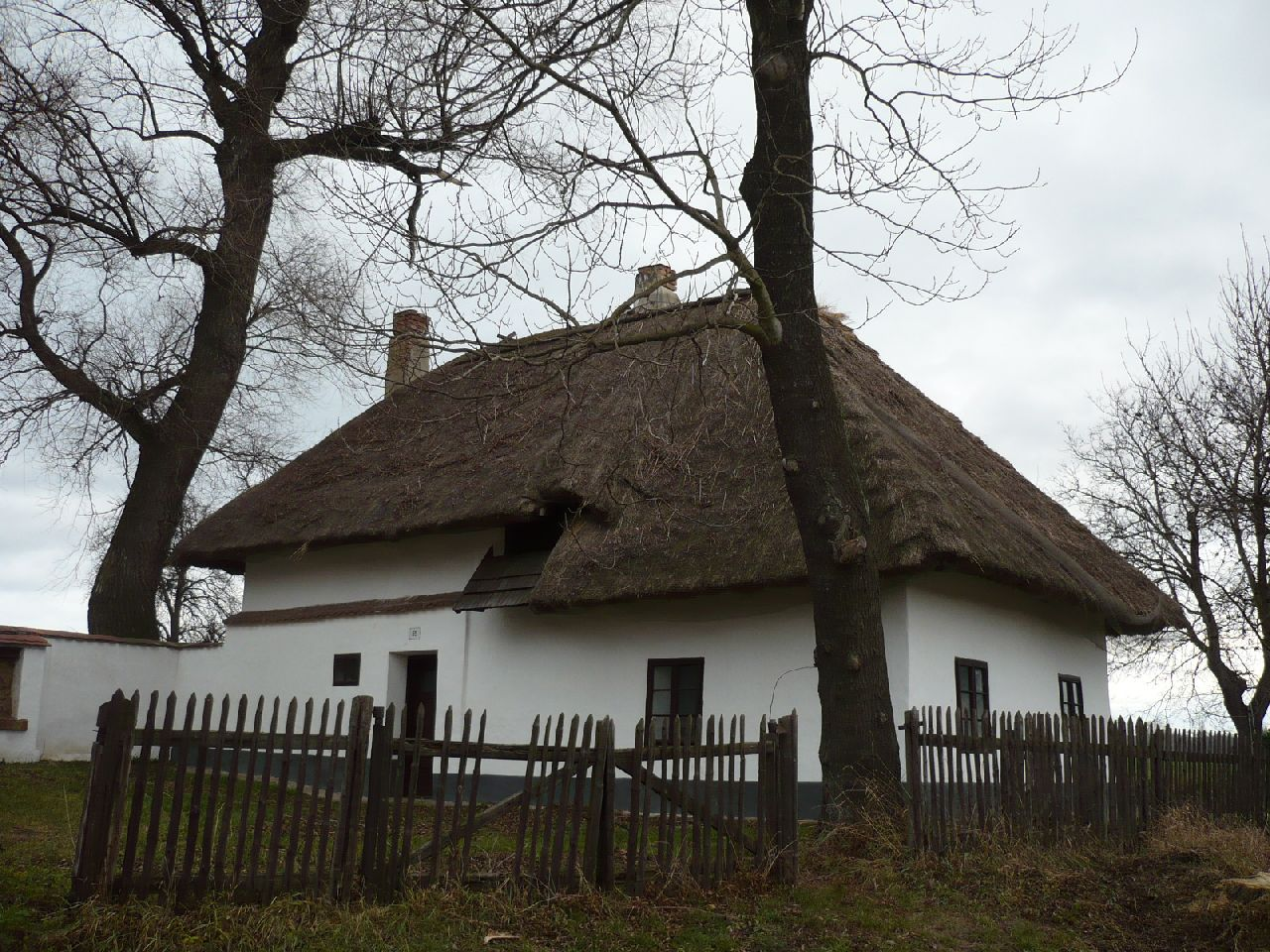
Example of vernacular architecture of Haná

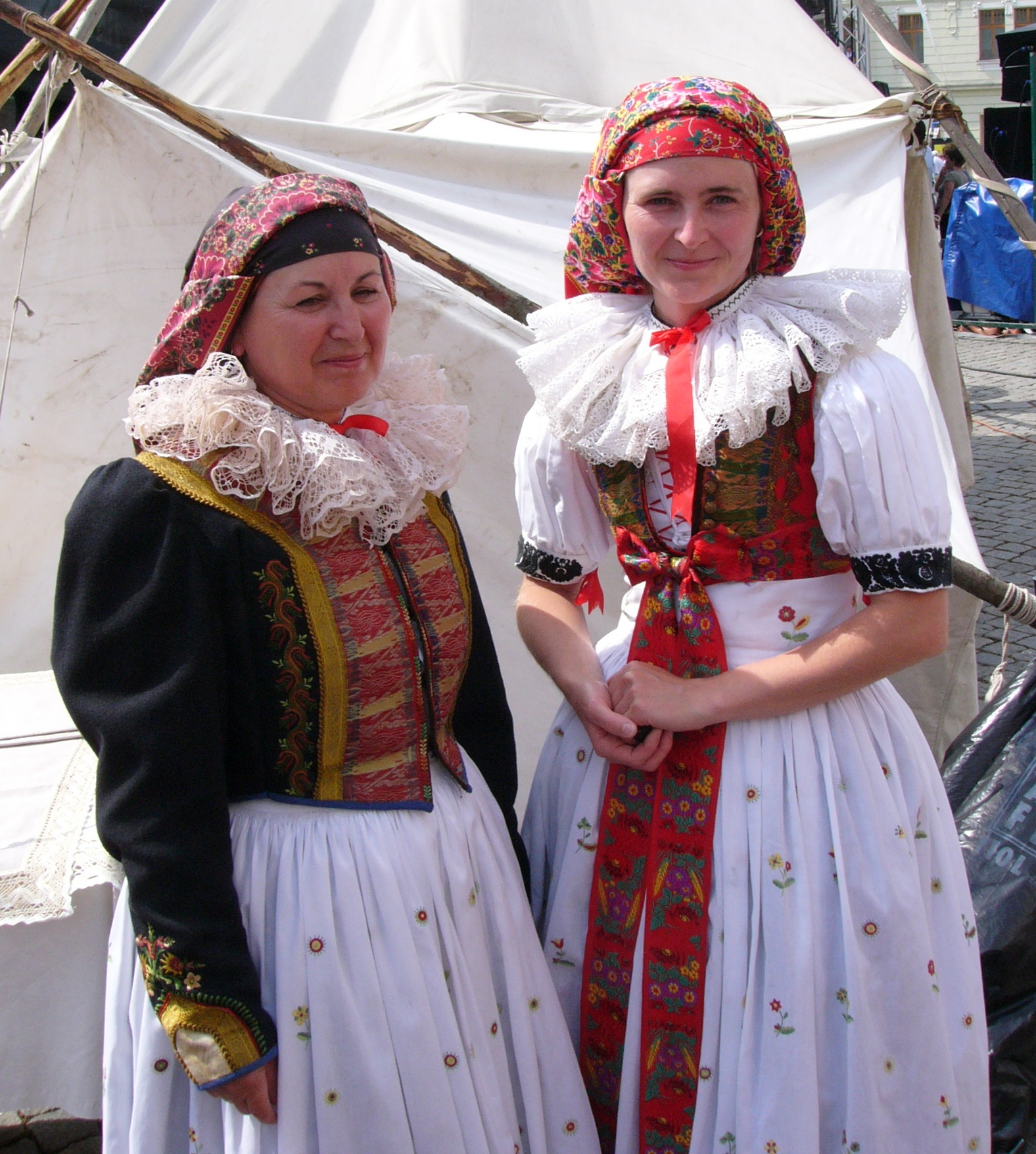
Kroj of Haná

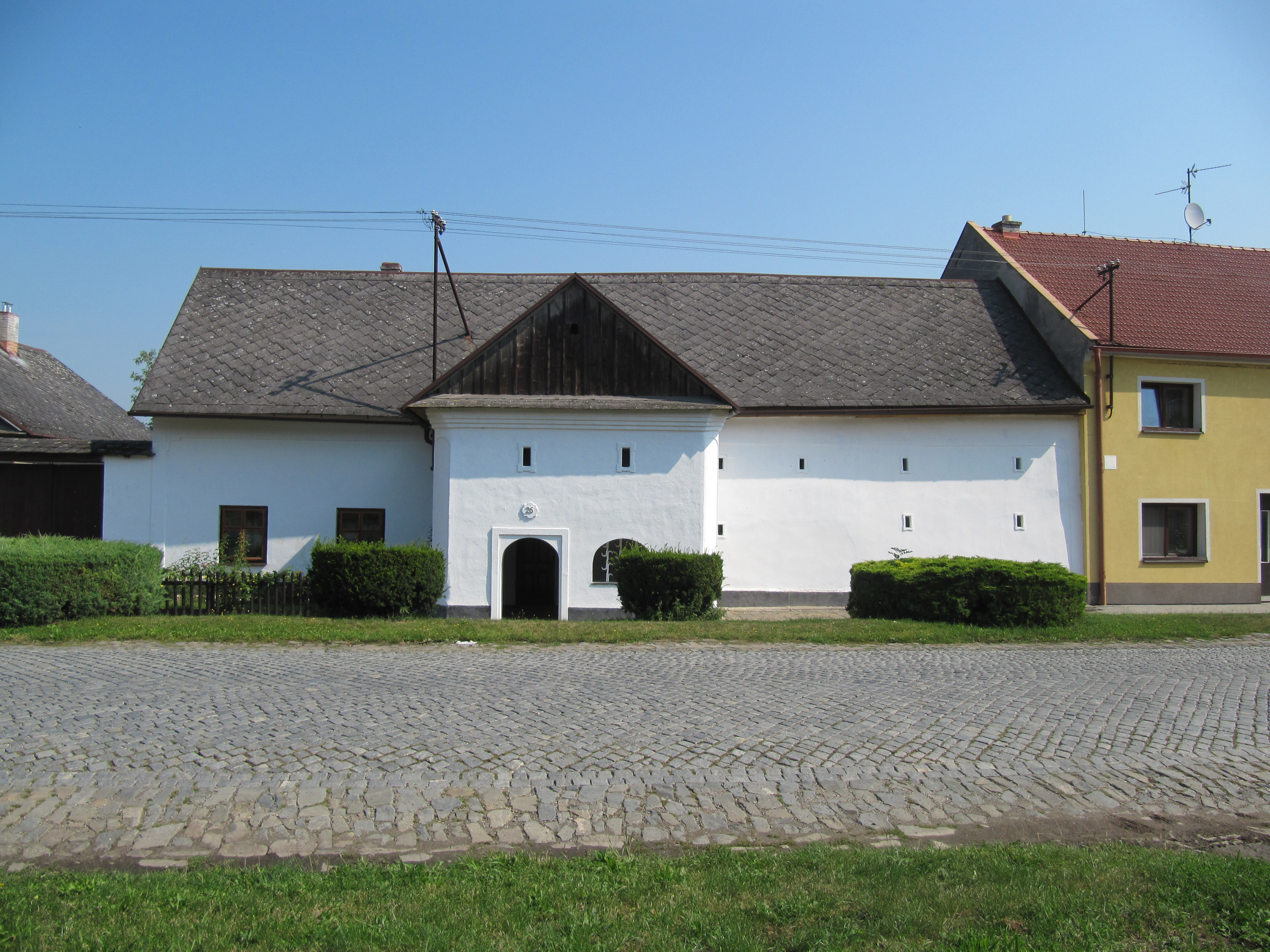
Haná vernacular architecture in Příkazy

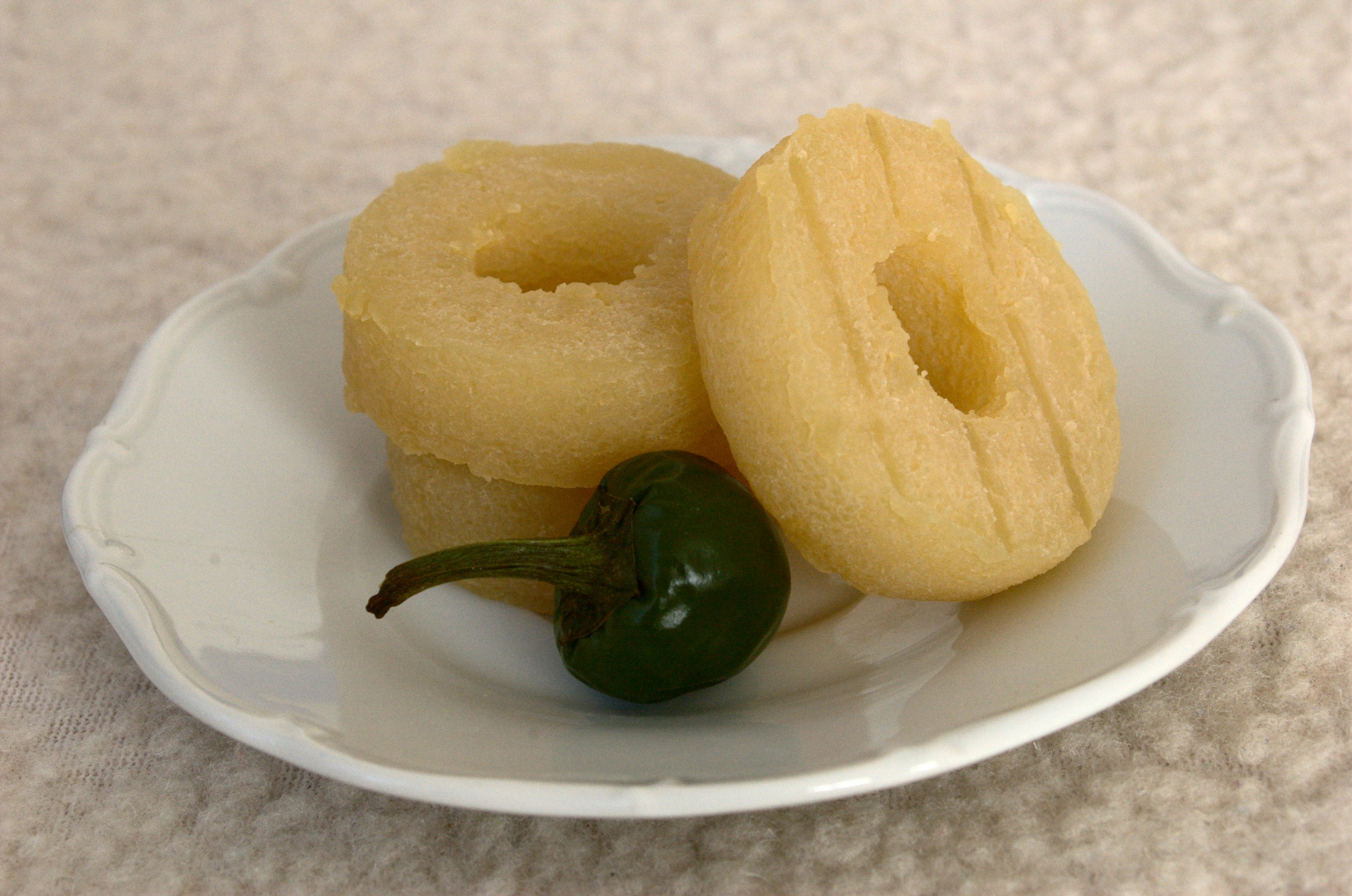
Olomoucké tvarůžky, a traditional Haná cheese

Haná or Hanakia (Czech: Haná or Hanácko, German: Hanna or Hanakei) is an ethnographic region in central Moravia in the Czech Republic.

== Etymology ==
The region was named after the Haná River.

== Description ==
Its core area is located along the eponymous river of Haná, around the city of Prostějov and the town of Vyškov, but in common perception it roughly corresponds to the whole Upper Morava Valley, with Olomouc as its natural centre. In terms of the actual administrative division, Haná covers the most of Olomouc Region and adjacent parts of South Moravian Region and Zlín Region.

The so-called Malá Haná ("Lesser Hanakia") is located in the Boskovice Furrow, west of Haná proper.

Haná is known for its agricultural fertility, rich costumes, and traditional customs. The Haná dialect (Hanakian dialect, Czech: hanáčtina) is spoken in the region, and is part of the Central Moravian dialect group (which is even often referred to as the "Hanakian dialects"). This traditional dialect has been preserved and continues to be used even in printed publications from the region. Folk music from Haná is recognized locally by its lyrics in the Haná dialect.

== Name ==
In the 18th and 19th century, the term "Hanack" (Hanák, French: Hanaque), was used for a Slavic people, peasants, in Moravia. Today, the Czech term Hanáci is used for an ethnographic group inhabiting the Haná region.

== Significant places ==
- Olomouc - the centre of Haná and the historical capital of Moravia with a pilgrimage site of Svatý Kopeček
- Přerov - industrial city, well known as an archeologically significant place where mammoth hunters settled in Předmostí.
- Prostějov - nicknamed the "Manchester of Haná" and, prior to the Holocaust, "Jerusalem of Haná".
- Kroměříž - nicknamed the "Athens of Haná".
- Vyškov - formerly called "Moravian Versailles" or "Versailles of Haná".
- Litovel - nicknamed the "Venice of Haná".
- Litovelské pomoraví Protected Landscape Area
- Příkazy - the Haná Open Air Museum
- Kojetín
- Náměšť na Hané
- Hulín
- Holešov
