= Oskava (river) =

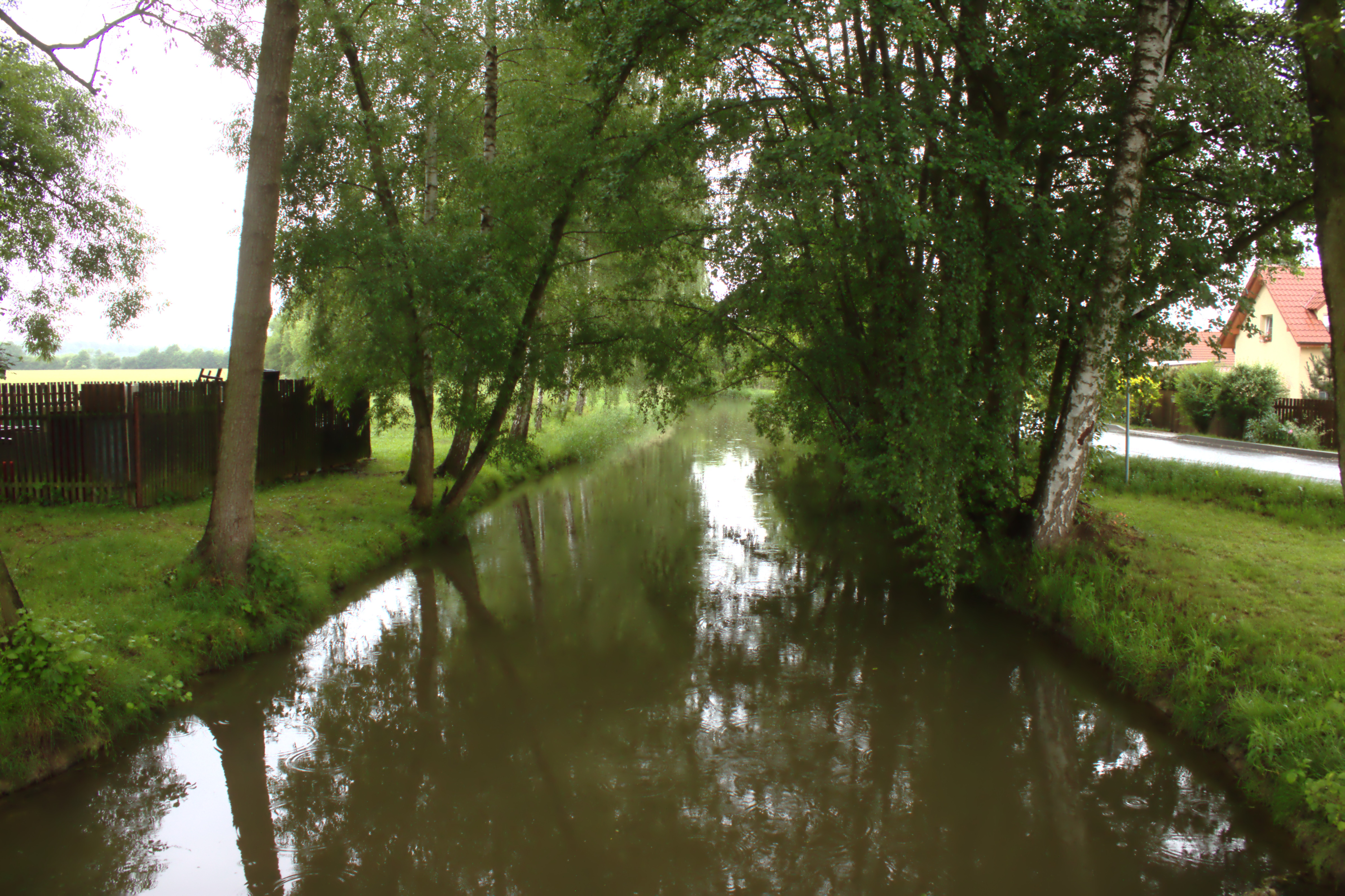
- The Oskava in Pňovice

Location
- Country: Czech Republic
- Region: Olomouc

Physical characteristics
- Source
  - location: Oskava, Hanušovice Highlands
  - coordinates: 49°58′46″N 17°9′12″E
  - elevation: 835 m (2,740 ft)
- Mouth
  - location: Morava
  - coordinates: 49°37′56″N 17°14′45″E
  - elevation: 213 m (699 ft)
- Length: 50.3 km (31.3 mi)
- Basin size: 569.2 km^{2} (219.8 sq mi)
- Discharge
  - average: 3.53 m^{3}/s (125 cu ft/s) near estuary

Basin features
- Progression: Morava→ Danube→ Black Sea

The Oskava (Czech pronunciation: [ˈoskava]) is a river in the Czech Republic, a left tributary of the Morava River. It flows through the Olomouc Region. It is 50.3 km (31.3 mi) long.

== Etymology ==
The name has its root in the Old High German word Askaha, which meant 'ash forest'.

== Characteristic ==
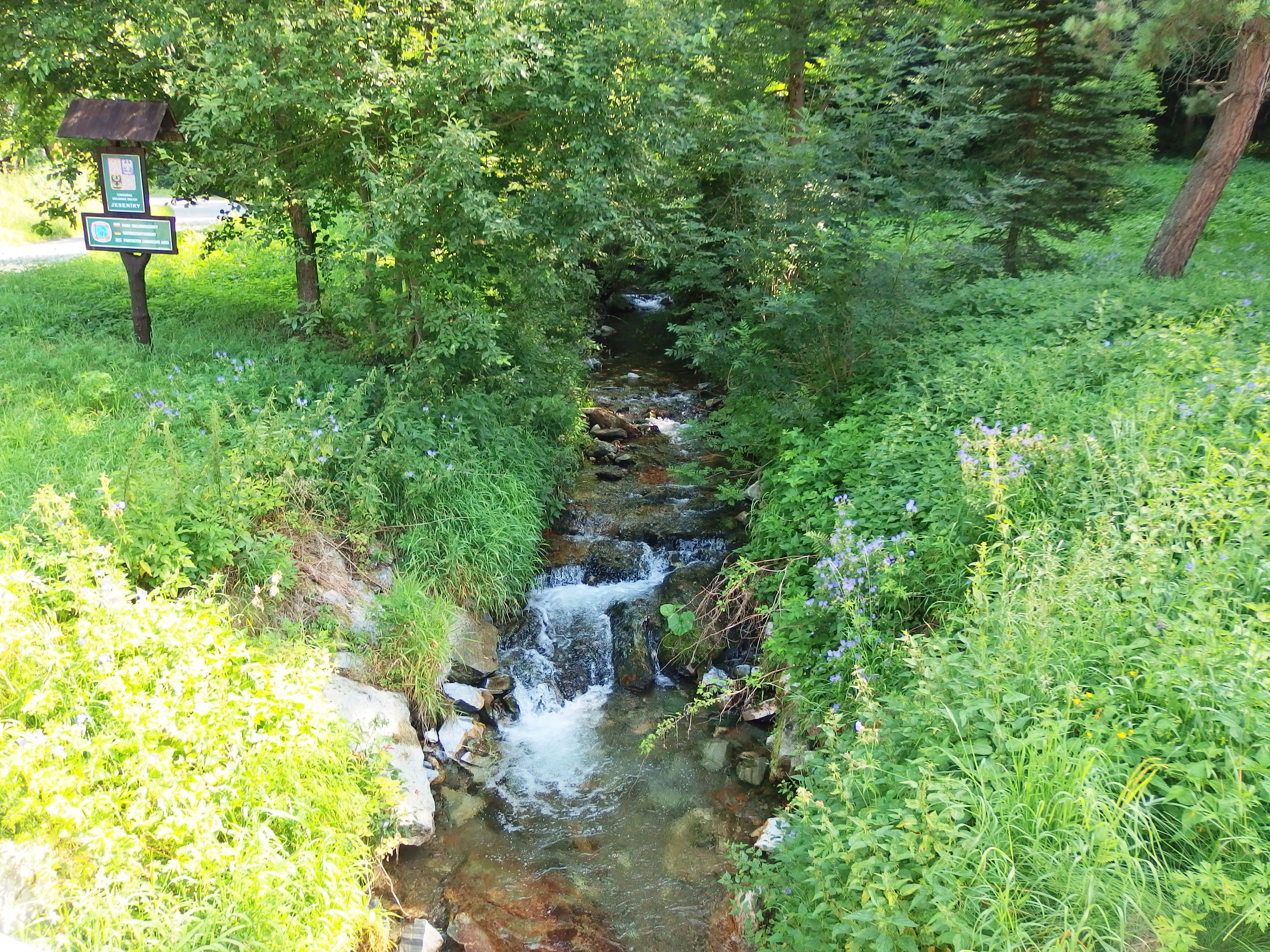
Upper course of the Oskava

The Oskava originates in the territory of Oskava in the Hanušovice Highlands at an elevation of 831 m (2,726 ft) and flows to Olomouc, where it enters the Morava River at an elevation of 213 m (699 ft). It is 50.3 km (31.3 mi) long. Its drainage basin has an area of 569.2 km^{2} (219.8 sq mi). The average discharge at its mouth is 3.53 m^{3}/s (125 cu ft/s).

The longest tributaries of the Oskava are:

Tributary	Length (km)	River km	Side
Sitka	36.6	0.8	left
Teplička	25.3	10.3	left
Oslava	20.8	24.9	left
Lukavice	13.5	18.2	right
Mýdlový potok	12.5	33.9	right
Říčí potok	12.4	5.3	left
Dražůvka	9.5	29.2	left

Only the lower course of the river (starting from the confluence with the Oslava) is designated as a "significant watercourse" according to the law that defines the care of the water course.

== Course ==
The most notable settlement on the river is the town of Uničov. The river also briefly flows in the territory of the city of Olomouc before its confluence with the Morava. The river flows through the municipal territories of Oskava, Šumvald, Libina, Šumvald, Nová Hradečná, Uničov, Želechovice, Pňovice, Žerotín, Liboš, Štěpánov, Štarnov and Olomouc.

== Bodies of water ==
There are 225 bodies of water in the basin area. The largest of them is Chomoutovské jezero Lake with an area of 68.3 ha (169 acres). The Oskava also supplies two notable fishponds – Šumvaldský rybník with an area of 48.1 ha (119 acres) and Dolní Libina with an area of 12.7 ha (31 acres).

== Protection of nature ==
The Oskava originates in the Jeseníky Protected Landscape Area and leaves the protected area after 6.5 km (4.0 mi). The lower course of the river (shortly before its confluence with the Morava) flows along the Litovelské Pomoraví Protected Landscape Area, but never enters the protected area.

== See also ==
- List of rivers of the Czech Republic
