= Štěpánov =

- Town
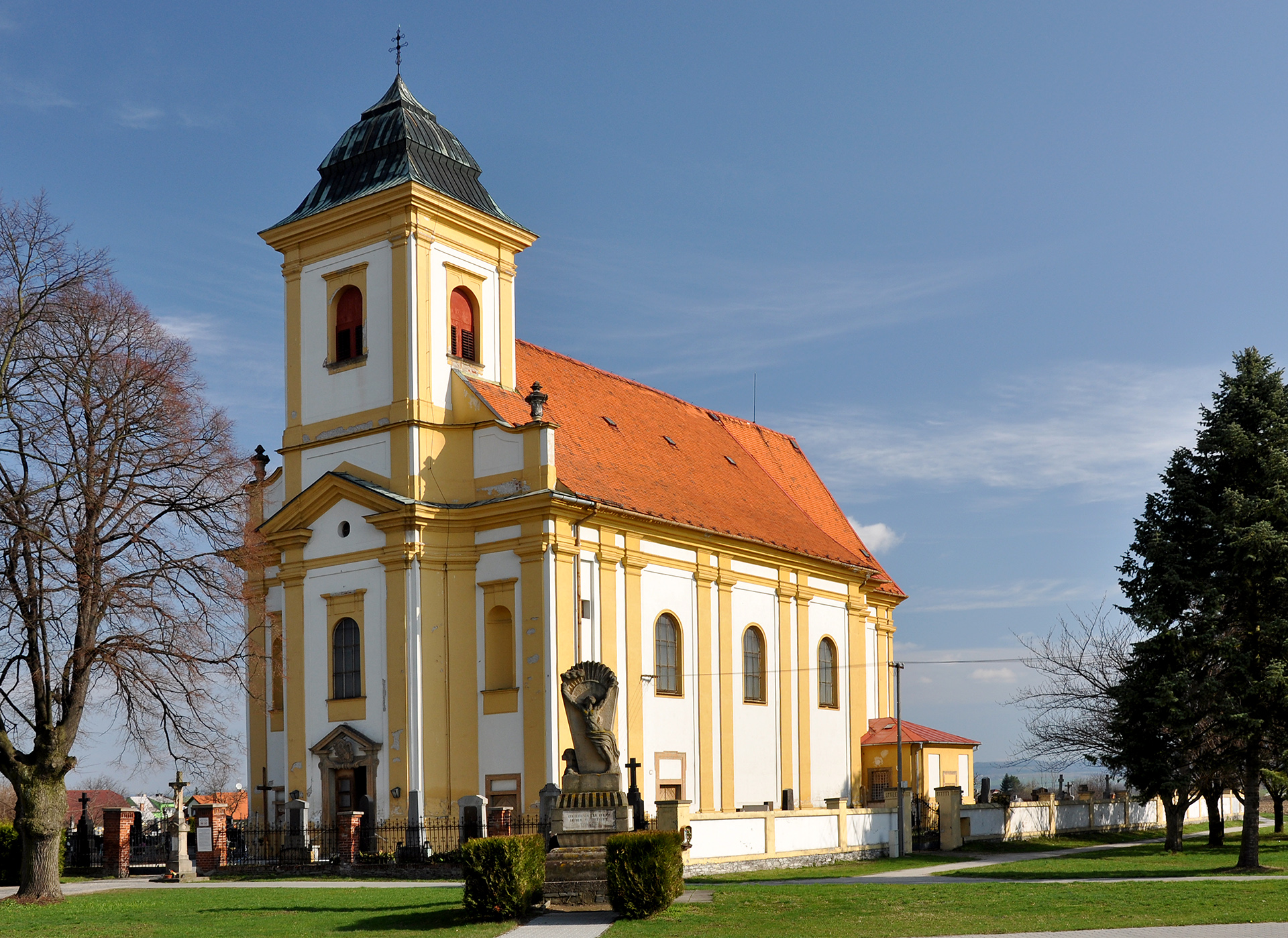
- Church of Saint Lawrence

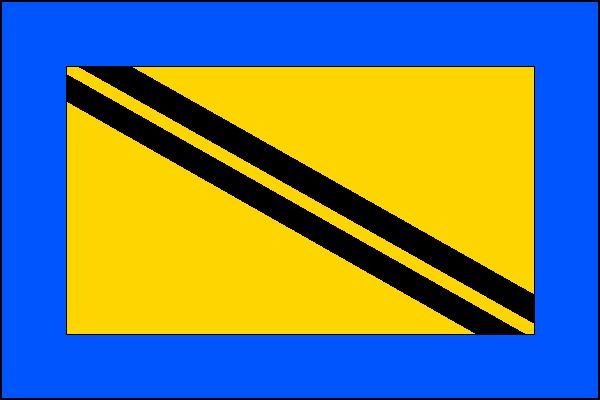
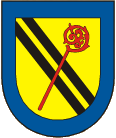
- Flag Coat of arms

- Location in the Czech Republic
- Coordinates: 49°41′3″N 17°13′14″E
- Country: Czech Republic
- Region: Olomouc
- District: Olomouc
- First mentioned: 1201

Government
  - Mayor: Jiří Šindler

Area
  - Total: 26.84 km^{2} (10.36 sq mi)
- Elevation: 232 m (761 ft)

Population (2026-01-01)
  - Total: 3,489
  - Density: 130.0/km^{2} (336.7/sq mi)
- Time zone: UTC+1 (CET)
  - Summer (DST): UTC+2 (CEST)
- Postal code: 783 13
- Website: www.stepanov.cz

Štěpánov (Czech pronunciation: [ˈʃcɛpaːnof]) is a town in Olomouc District in the Olomouc Region of the Czech Republic. It has about 3,600 inhabitants. The town is located in the Upper Morava Valley, between the Oskava and Morava rivers. Štěpánov became a town in 2020, making it one of the youngest Czech towns.

== Administrative division ==
Štěpánov consists of three municipal parts (in brackets population according to the 2021 census):

- Štěpánov (2,505)
- Březce (307)
- Moravská Huzová (577)

== Geography ==
Štěpánov is located about 10 kilometres (6 mi) north of Olomouc. It lies in a flat landscape in the Upper Morava Valley. It is located in the fertile agricultural region of Haná between the Oskava and Morava rivers, which form parts of the municipal border. The Litovelské Pomoraví Protected Landscape Area extends into the municipal territory in the west.

== History ==
The first written mention of Štěpánov is in a donation deed of King Ottokar I from 1201. Moravska Huzová was first mentioned in a deed of Bishop Jindřich Zdík from 1141. Březce was first mentioned in 1276. In 1845, the railway was put into operation.

From 1976, Liboš was a municipal part of Štěpánov, but it became independent again on 24 November 1990. Štěpánov obtained the town status in 2020.

== Demographics ==
Historical population

Year	Pop.	±%
1869	3,768	—
1880	3,756	−0.3%
1890	3,859	+2.7%
1900	4,062	+5.3%
1910	3,905	−3.9%

Year	Pop.	±%
1921	4,063	+4.0%
1930	4,431	+9.1%
1950	3,302	−25.5%
1961	3,412	+3.3%
1970	3,241	−5.0%

Year	Pop.	±%
1980	3,666	+13.1%
1991	3,312	−9.7%
2001	3,329	+0.5%
2011	3,274	−1.7%
2021	3,389	+3.5%

Source: Censuses

== Transport ==
Štěpánov is located on the railway line Nezamyslice–Kouty nad Desnou via Prostějov, Olomouc and Šumperk.

== Sights ==
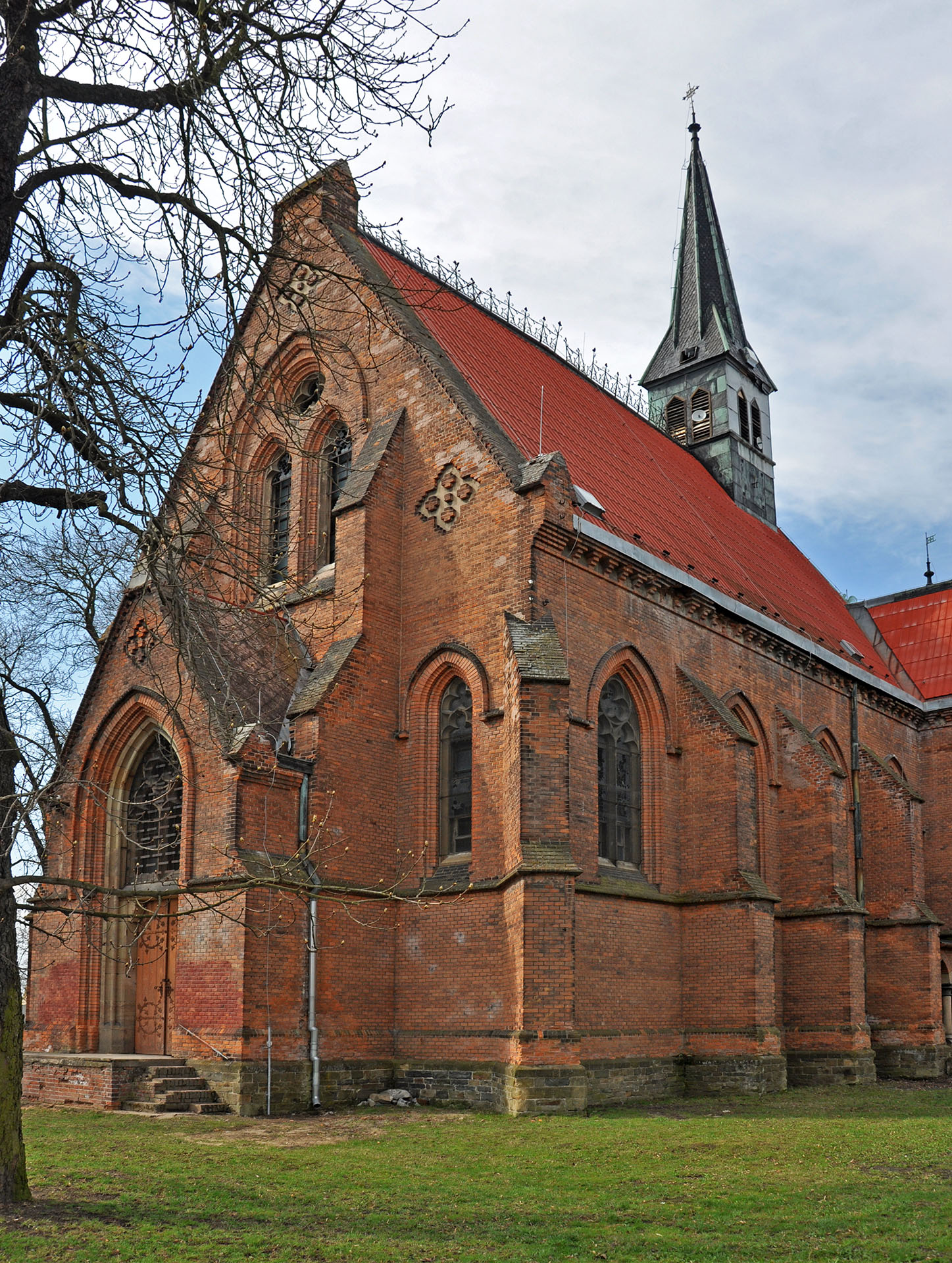
Church of Saint Barbara

The main landmark of Štěpánov is the Church of Saint Lawrence. The construction of this Baroque church was finished in 1773.

The Church of Saint Barbara was built in the neo-Gothic style in 1872–1875 according to the design by Friedrich von Schmidt. It was built in a workers' colony for the needs of the German minority. After World War II it served as a warehouse. Today it is owned by the town and serves cultural and social purposes.

== Twin towns – sister cities ==
Štěpánov is twinned with:

- Środa Śląska, Poland
