= Uničov =

- Town
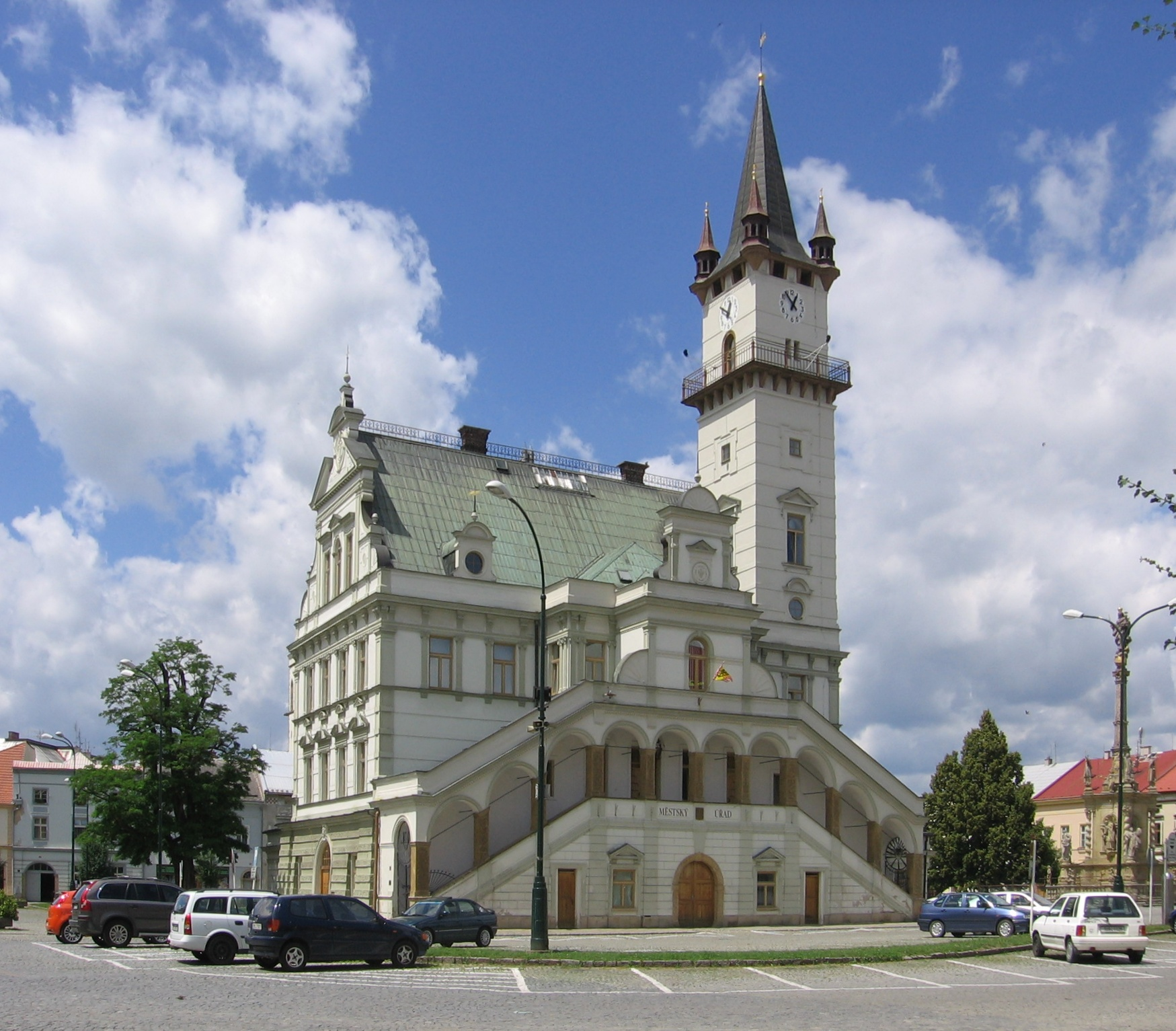
- Town hall

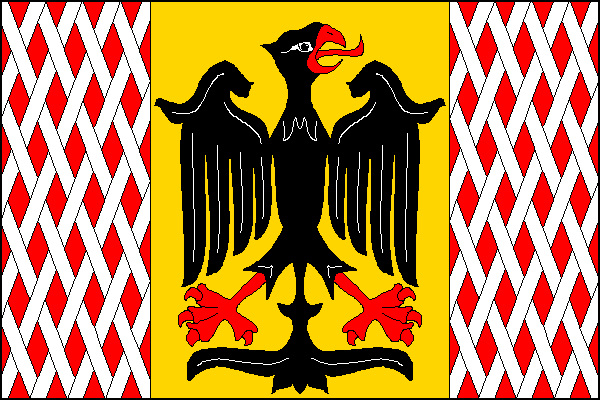
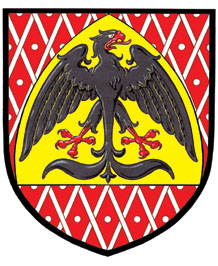
- Flag Coat of arms

- Location in the Czech Republic
- Coordinates: 49°46′15″N 17°7′17″E
- Country: Czech Republic
- Region: Olomouc
- District: Olomouc
- Founded: c. 1213

Government
  - Mayor: Jiří Urbášek (ODS)

Area
  - Total: 48.27 km^{2} (18.64 sq mi)
- Elevation: 248 m (814 ft)

Population (2026-01-01)
  - Total: 11,060
  - Density: 229.1/km^{2} (593.4/sq mi)
- Time zone: UTC+1 (CET)
  - Summer (DST): UTC+2 (CEST)
- Postal code: 783 91
- Website: www.unicov.cz

Uničov (Czech pronunciation: [ˈuɲɪtʃof]; German: Mährisch Neustadt) is a town in Olomouc District in the Olomouc Region of the Czech Republic. It has about 11,000 inhabitants. The town is located in the Upper Morava Valley on the Oskava River. It is known for UNEX, a heavy engineering company.

Uničov was founded around 1213 and was a royal town. The historic town centre is well preserved and is protected as an urban monument zone. The main landmark of Uničov it the pseudo-Renaissance town hall on the town square.

== Administrative division ==
Uničov consists of nine municipal parts (in brackets population according to the 2021 census):

- Uničov (9,205)
- Benkov (204)
- Brníčko (338)
- Dětřichov (122)
- Dolní Sukolom (276)
- Horní Sukolom (119)
- Nová Dědina (112)
- Renoty (192)
- Střelice (396)

== Etymology ==
The name Uničov is derived from the personal name Unič. At the beginning of the 13th century, a town was founded on the site of the original village, which is the cause of the Latin name Nova civitas and German name Neustadt, both meaning 'new town'. The German adjective Mährisch (i.e. 'Moravian') was given in the 18th century to distinguish it from other places with the same name.

== Geography ==
Uničov is located about 21 km (13 mi) northwest of Olomouc. It lies in a flat agricultural landscape of the Upper Morava Valley lowland. The Oskava River flows through the town. The western tip of the municipal territory extends into the Litovelské Pomoraví Protected Landscape Area.

== History ==
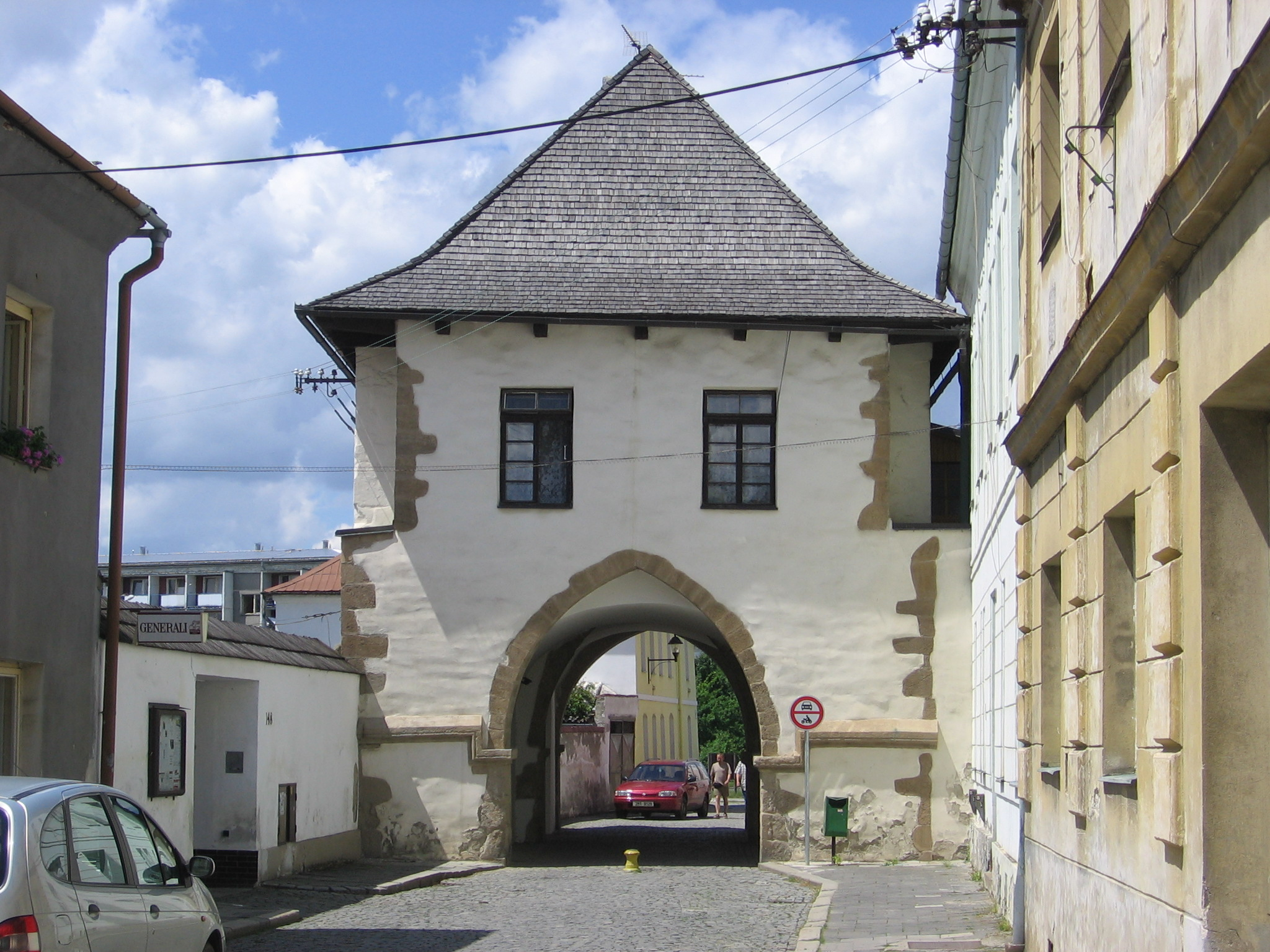
Medelská Gate, a remnant of the town fortifications

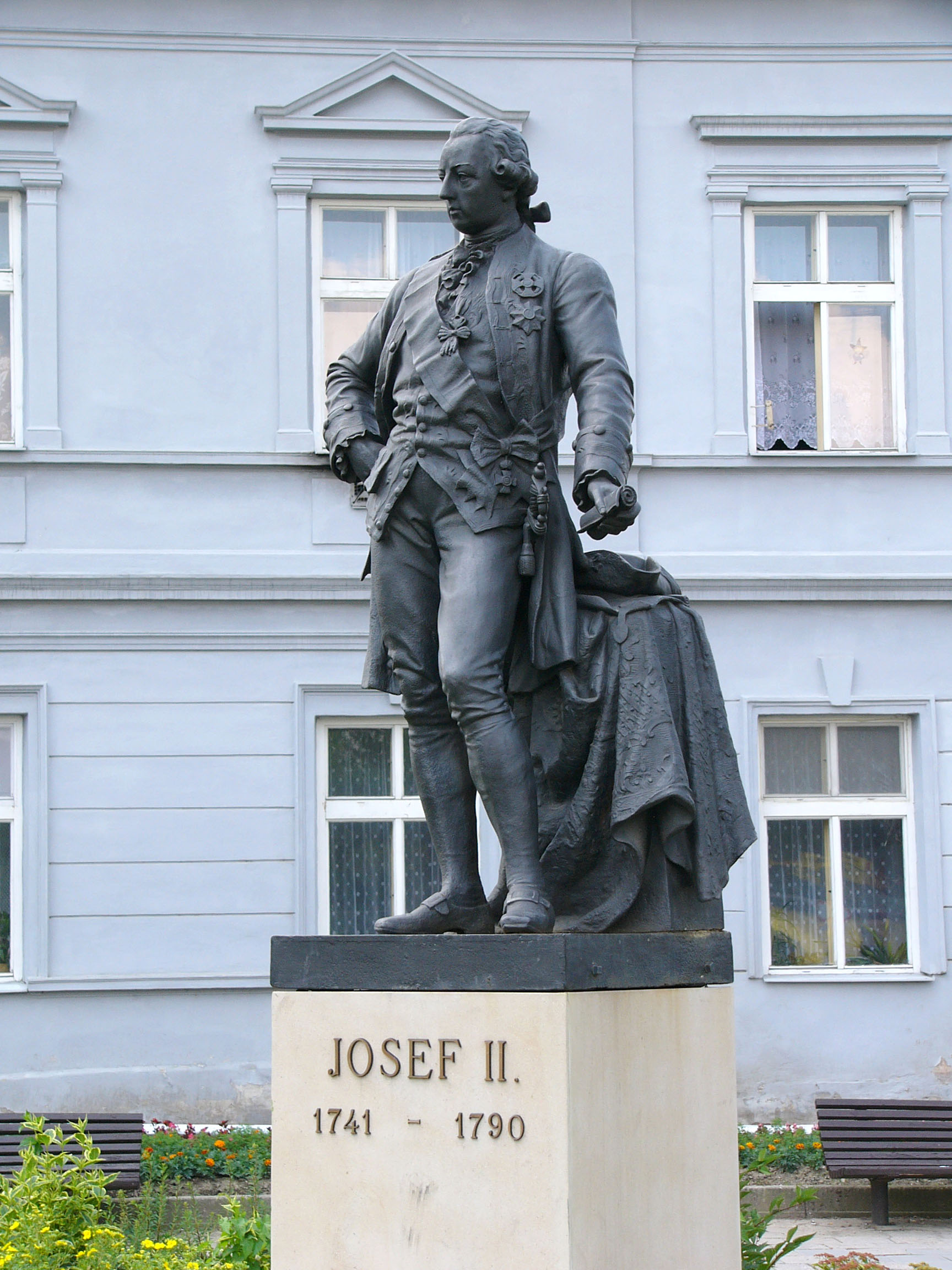
Statue of Emperor Joseph II

Uničov is one of the seven royal Moravian towns. It was founded around 1213 by the Margrave Vladislaus III, the brother of King Ottokar I of Bohemia. It received Magdeburg rights in 1223 and was granted further privileges by Ottokar's successor, King Wenceslaus I, in 1234. The town was to become a centre of ore and precious metal mining, but the deposits were not so plentiful. The town therefore reoriented itself to trade and crafts, and in 1327 it was fortified.

Until the Hussite Wars, the town administration of Uničov was controlled by German colonisers. In 1422, Hussite forces under the command of Sigismund Korybut occupied the town and got rid of the German administration. After the accession of the Hussite king George of Poděbrady in 1458, the town became a centre of the new confession until it fell to his rival Matthias Corvinus in 1479.

A part of the Habsburg monarchy from 1526, Uničov prospered until the Battle of White Mountain in 1620. For participating in the Bohemian rebellion, the town was divested of its privileges by Emperor Ferdinand II and made a subject of the Austrian House of Liechtenstein, a verdict that however was overruled a few years later.

The citizens nevertheless suffered severely in the Thirty Years' War, when in 1642 the town was occupied by Swedish troops. In 1643, a large fire further damaged Uničov. The Swedes did not leave the town until 1650. Uničov recovered only slowly from the consequences of the war and had economic problems. It became a small rural town.

After the Seven Years' War, Emperor Joseph II met here with the Prussian king Frederick the Great in 1770, a rapprochement of the former enemies that would lead to the First Partition of Poland two years later.

After World War II, the remaining German-speaking population was expelled. In 1948, the construction of a large engineering plant began, which led to the migration of new residents to the town.

== Demographics ==
Historical population

Year	Pop.	±%
1869	7,333	—
1880	7,678	+4.7%
1890	7,662	−0.2%
1900	7,752	+1.2%
1910	7,783	+0.4%

Year	Pop.	±%
1921	7,262	−6.7%
1930	7,513	+3.5%
1950	5,764	−23.3%
1961	9,072	+57.4%
1970	11,321	+24.8%

Year	Pop.	±%
1980	12,270	+8.4%
1991	12,831	+4.6%
2001	12,466	−2.8%
2011	11,659	−6.5%
2021	10,964	−6.0%

Source: Censuses

== Economy ==
The main commercial activity of Uničov nowadays takes place at the engineering-metallurgical complex UNEX. This heavy engineering company is worldwide known for its production of bucket-wheel excavators.

== Transport ==
Uničov is located on the railway line Olomouc–Šumperk.

== Sights ==
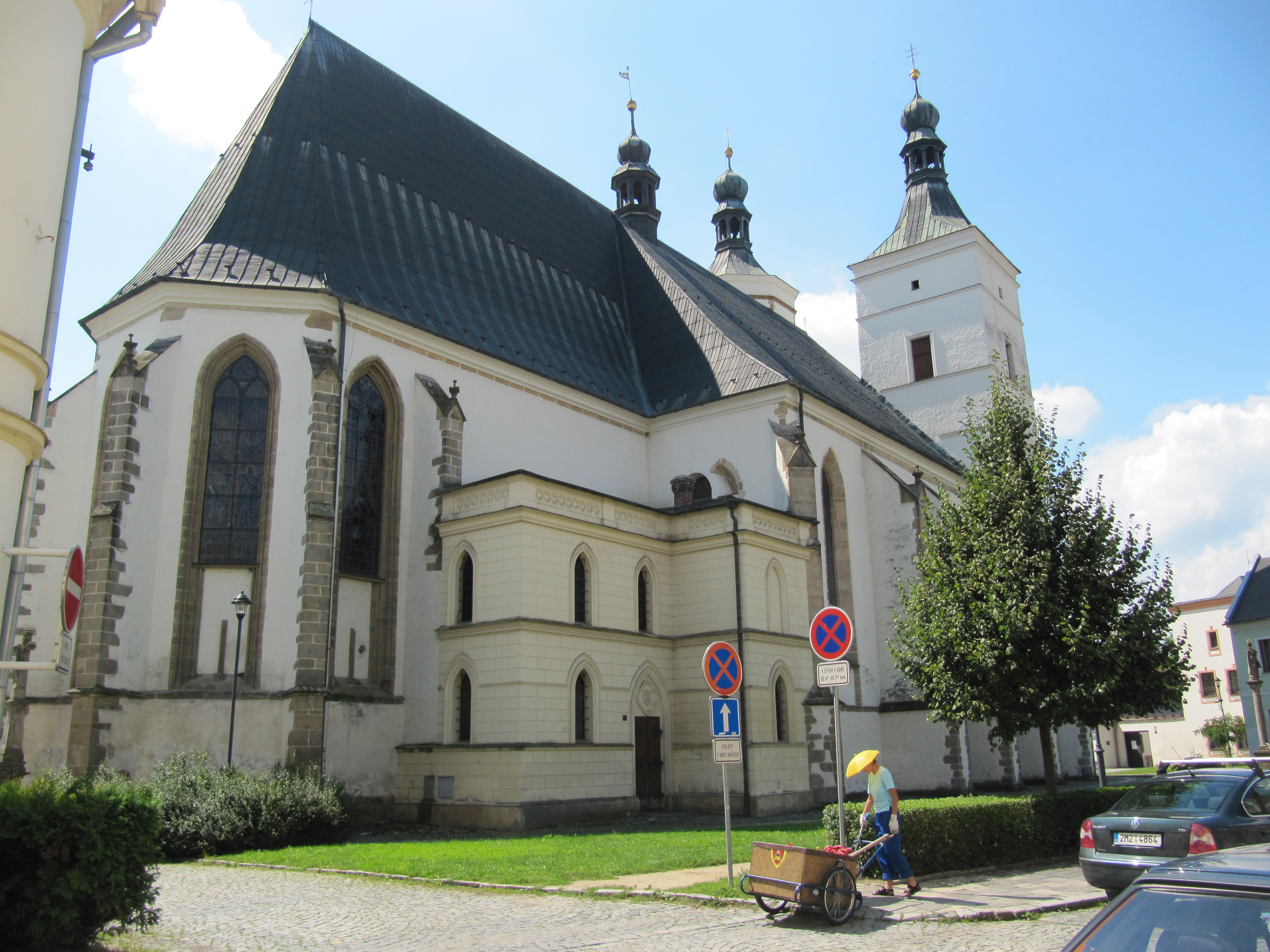
Church of the Assumption of the Virgin Mary

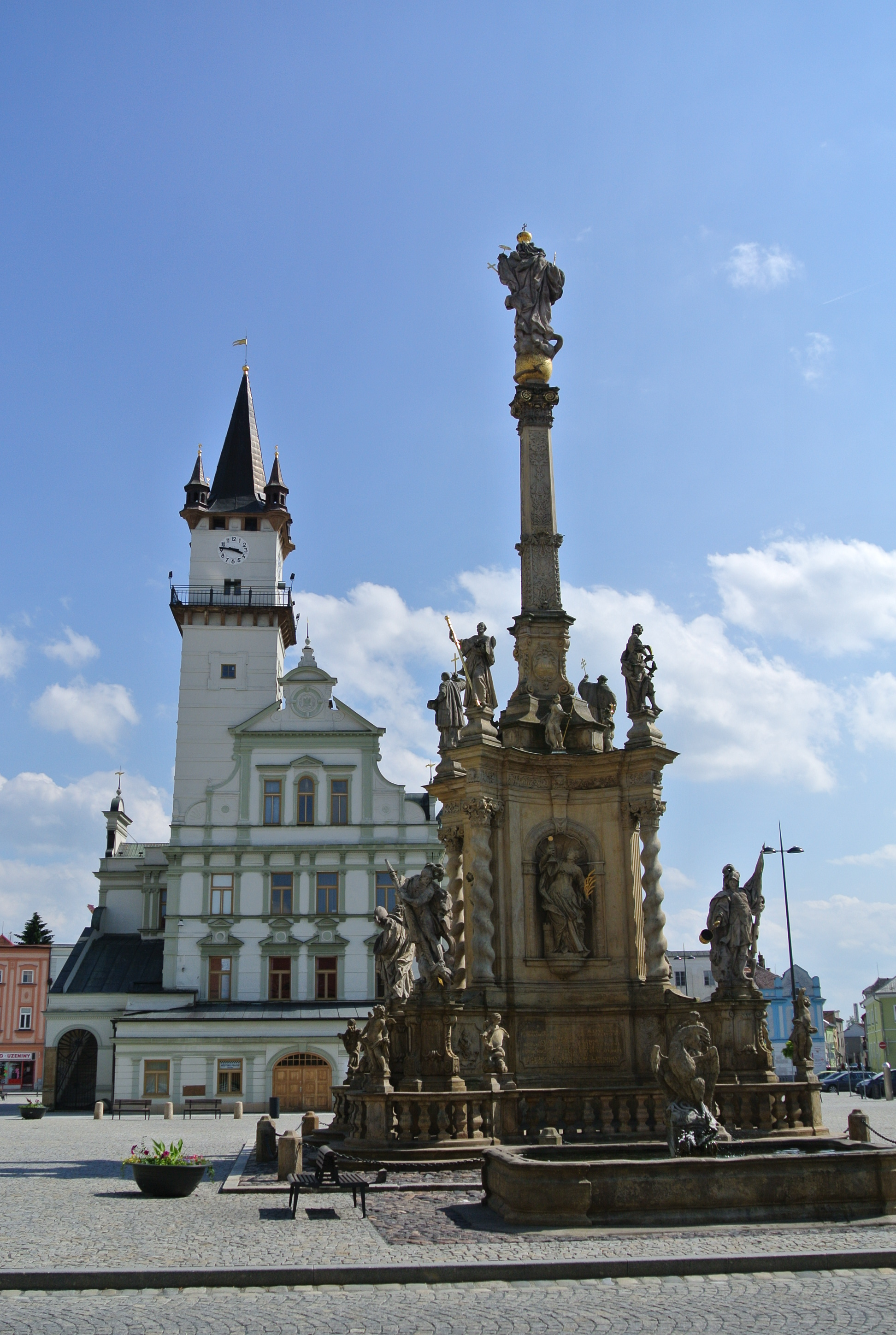
Marian column

The town hall is the main landmark of the town square, located in the middle of the square. It was built in the late 14th or early 15th century and originally served as a market house. The town hall was rebuilt several times and lost its Gothic character. Gradually a 45 metres (148 ft) high tower and a chapel (now a ceremonial hall) were added. In the 19th century, it was rebuilt to its current pseudo-Renaissance form.

In the middle of the square is also a 22 metres (72 ft) high Marian column, one of the most significant in Moravia. It was completed in 1743.

The Church of the Assumption of the Virgin Mary dates from the first half of the 14th century. It is a significant example of the Gothic and late Renaissance architecture. The church burned down a total of eight times and was therefore repaired and modified many times. It has two towers, one of them being octagonal.

The Church of the Exaltation of the Holy Cross is a remnant of a Minorite monastery complex that was abolished in the 19th century. In addition to the baroque rebuilt part, the original gothic part is also visible. Today it serves as a concert hall.

Vodní branka (lit. 'water gate') is an architecturally valuable Renaissance building that was part of the town fortifications and served as an armory. Today it is the town museum.

== Notable people ==
- Sigismund Albicus (c. 1360–1427), Archbishop of Prague
- Leopold Waber (1875–1945), Austrian lawyer and politician
- Petr Uličný (1950–2026), football player and manager
- Jan Březina (born 1954), politician, mayor of Uničov in 1995–1997
- Jan Hruška (born 1975), bicycle racer
- Lukáš Plšek (born 1983), ice hockey player

== Twin towns – sister cities ==
Uničov is twinned with:

- Bieruń-Lędziny County, Poland
- Dubno, Ukraine
- Jelšava, Slovakia
- Lędziny, Poland
- Roccagorga, Italy
