= Plšek =

Plšek (feminine Plšková) is a Czech surname. Notable people with the surname include:

- Jakub Plšek (born 1993), Czech footballer
- Lukáš Plšek (born 1983), Czech ice hockey player
- Ondřej Plšek (born 1981), Czech darts player
