= Mladeč =

- Municipality
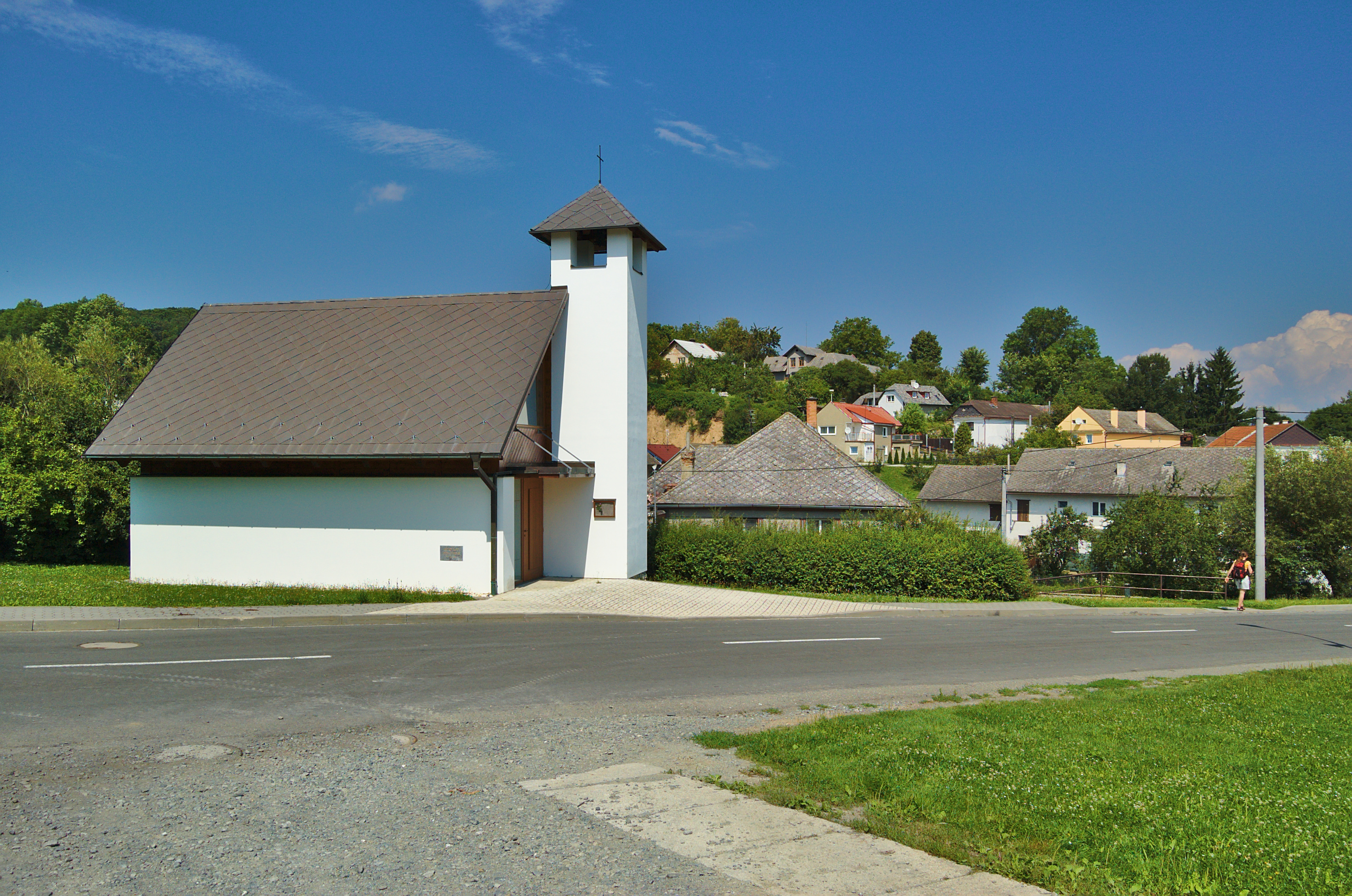
- Chapel of Saint Florian

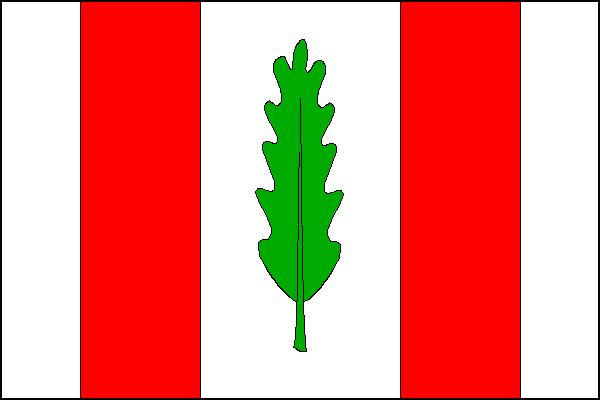
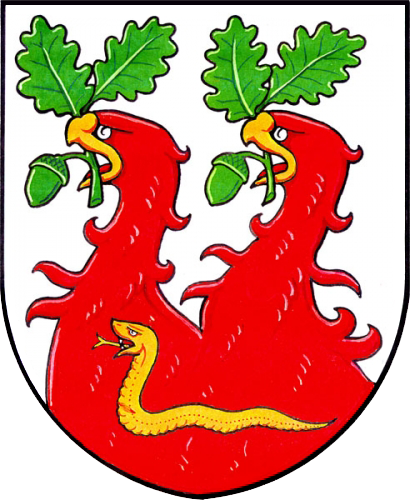
- Flag Coat of arms

- Location in the Czech Republic
- Coordinates: 49°42′21″N 17°1′10″E
- Country: Czech Republic
- Region: Olomouc
- District: Olomouc
- First mentioned: 1350

Area
  - Total: 12.07 km^{2} (4.66 sq mi)
- Elevation: 251 m (823 ft)

Population (2026-01-01)
  - Total: 730
  - Density: 60/km^{2} (160/sq mi)
- Time zone: UTC+1 (CET)
  - Summer (DST): UTC+2 (CEST)
- Postal code: 783 21, 784 01
- Website: www.mladec.cz

Mladeč (German: Lautsch) is a municipality and village in Olomouc District in the Olomouc Region of the Czech Republic. It has about 700 inhabitants.

== Administrative division ==
Mladeč consists of three municipal parts (in brackets population according to the 2021 census):

- Mladeč (421)
- Nové Zámky (102)
- Sobáčov (231)

== Geography ==
Mladeč is located about 20 kilometres (12 mi) northwest of Olomouc. It extends into three geomorphological regions: the southern part of the municipal territory with the Mladeč and Sobáčov villages lies in the Zábřeh Highlands, the central part lies in the Upper Morava Valley, and the northern part with the Nové Zámky village lies in the Hanušovice Highlands.

The Morava River flows through the central area of the municipality. The stream Mlýnský potok, a tributary of the Morava, also flows through the municipality and is divided here into two branches. There are two fishponds in the municipality: Sobáčovský rybník and Zámecký rybník. Most of the municipality is located in the Litovelské Pomoraví Protected Landscape Area.

== History ==
The first written mention of Mladeč is from 1350. Sobáčov was first mentioned in 1351.

== Demographics ==
Historical population

Year	Pop.	±%
1869	823	—
1880	878	+6.7%
1890	936	+6.6%
1900	875	−6.5%
1910	898	+2.6%

Year	Pop.	±%
1921	960	+6.9%
1930	865	−9.9%
1950	822	−5.0%
1961	841	+2.3%
1970	1,040	+23.7%

Year	Pop.	±%
1980	998	−4.0%
1991	859	−13.9%
2001	784	−8.7%
2011	734	−6.4%
2021	754	+2.7%

Source: Censuses

== Transport ==
The D35 motorway (part of the European route E442) from Olomouc to the Hradec Králové Region runs through the municipality.

== Sights ==
Mladeč is known for the Mladeč caves. They are open to the public.

In Nové Zámky is the Nové Zámky Castle. It was built in the Neoclassical style in 1813–1820 by a complete reconstruction of an old Baroque hunting lodge, according to the design by Joseph Hardtmuth. Around the castle is a large landscape park. Today the castle houses a social welfare institution.

== Archaeology ==
Mladeč is an Aurignacian archaeological site with directly dated remains of early modern human dating to about 31,000 radiocarbon years. The site contains remains of at least half a dozen individuals, including children. They are the oldest bones that indicate a human settlement or community in Europe. The Mladeč collection also includes Aurignacian tools and art associated with early modern humans. The remains appear to show some Neanderthal-like features.
