= Oskava =

- Municipality
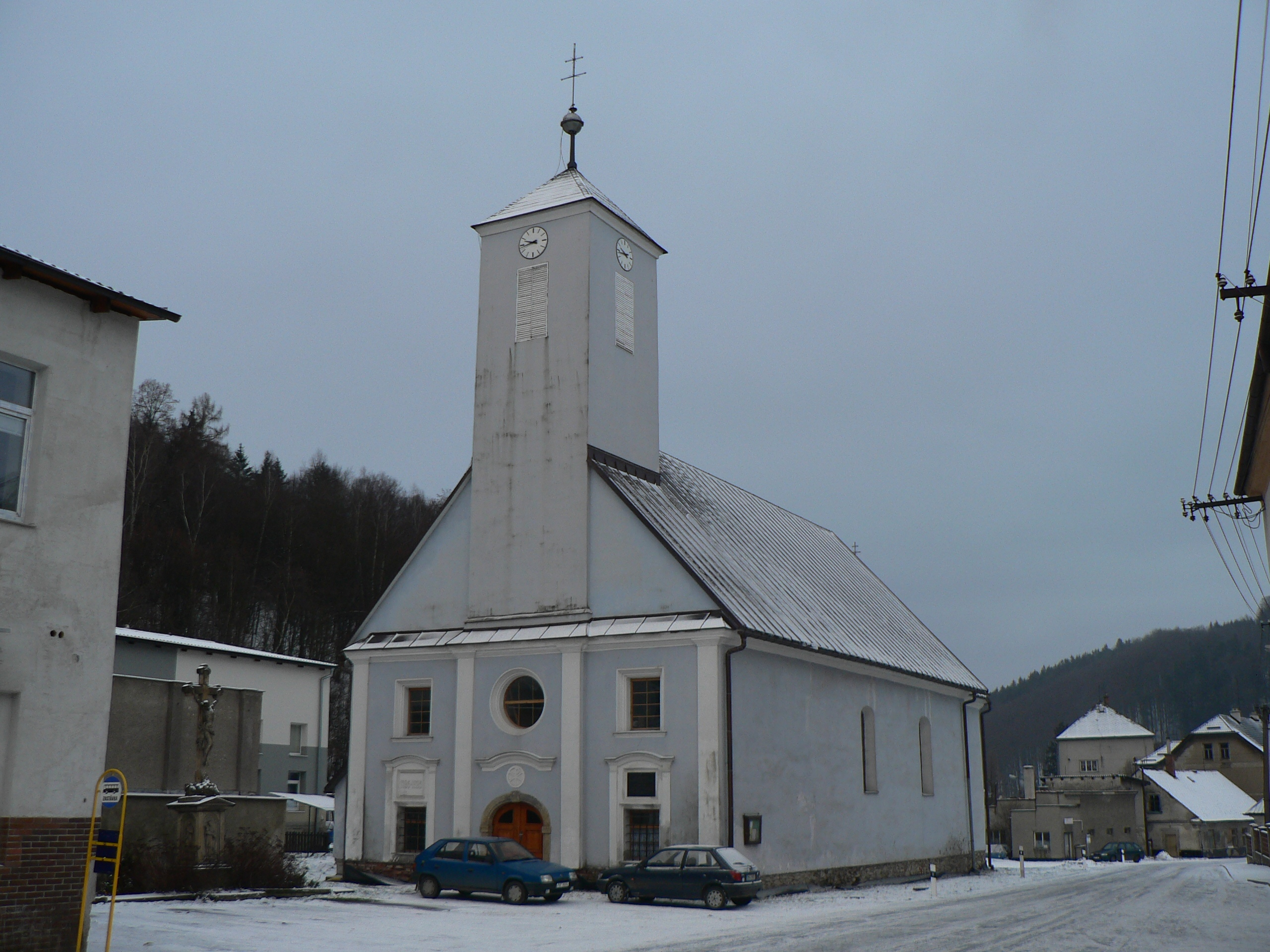
- Church of Saint Florian

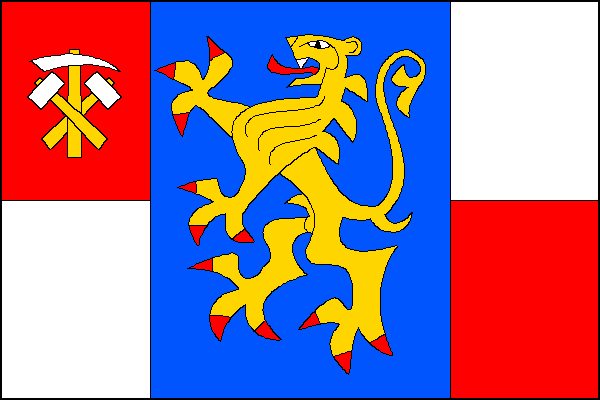
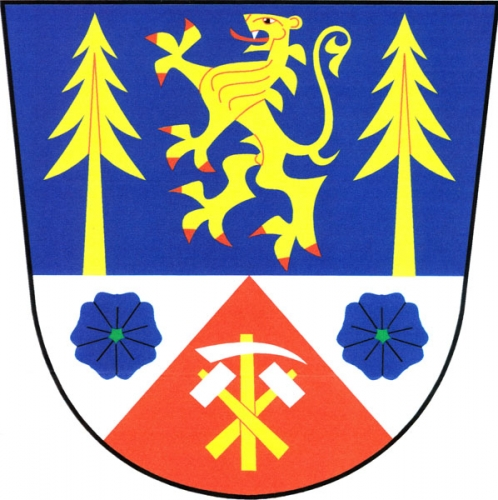
- Flag Coat of arms

- Location in the Czech Republic
- Coordinates: 49°53′43″N 17°7′56″E
- Country: Czech Republic
- Region: Olomouc
- District: Šumperk
- First mentioned: 1344

Area
  - Total: 59.48 km^{2} (22.97 sq mi)
- Elevation: 316 m (1,037 ft)

Population (2026-01-01)
  - Total: 1,283
  - Density: 21.57/km^{2} (55.87/sq mi)
- Time zone: UTC+1 (CET)
  - Summer (DST): UTC+2 (CEST)
- Postal codes: 788 01
- Website: www.ou-oskava.cz

Oskava (German: Oskau) is a municipality and village in Šumperk District in the Olomouc Region of the Czech Republic. It has about 1,300 inhabitants.

== Administrative division ==
Oskava consists of four municipal parts (in brackets population according to the 2021 census):

- Oskava (808)
- Bedřichov (110)
- Mostkov (242)
- Třemešek (111)

== Etymology ==
Oskava is named after the Oskava River.

== Geography ==
Oskava is located about 13 kilometres (8 mi) southeast of Šumperk and 34 km (21 mi) north of Olomouc. It lies in the Hanušovice Highlands. The highest point is located below the summit of Černé kameny at 950 m (3,117 ft) above sea level. The northern part of the territory lies within the Jeseníky Protected Landscape Area. The Oskava River flows through the municipality.

== History ==
The first written mention of Oskava and Mostkov is from 1344. The first written mention of Třemešek is from 1371. The village of Bedřichov was founded in 1620. In 1960, Bedřichov, Mostkov and Třemešek were joined to Oskava.

== Demographics ==
Historical population

Year	Pop.	±%
1869	3,829	—
1880	3,728	−2.6%
1890	3,702	−0.7%
1900	3,335	−9.9%
1910	3,315	−0.6%

Year	Pop.	±%
1921	2,883	−13.0%
1930	2,862	−0.7%
1950	1,730	−39.6%
1961	1,825	+5.5%
1970	1,718	−5.9%

Year	Pop.	±%
1980	1,694	−1.4%
1991	1,523	−10.1%
2001	1,484	−2.6%
2011	1,385	−6.7%
2021	1,271	−8.2%

Source: Censuses

== Transport ==
There are no railways or major roads passing through the municipality.

== Sights ==
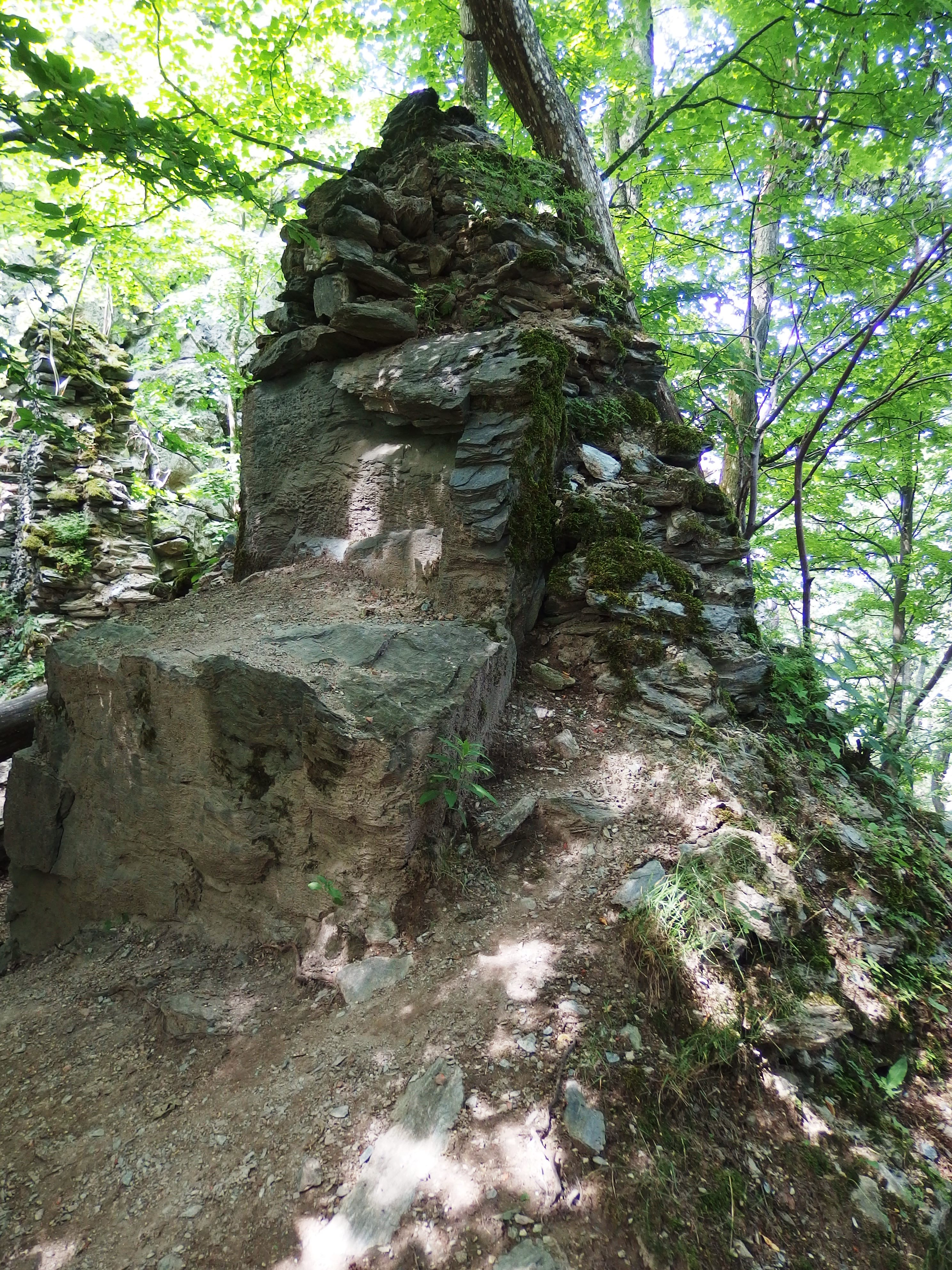
Fragments of Rabštejn Castle

Oskava is home to the ruins of Rabštejn Castle from the turn of the 13th and 14th centuries. The castle was first mentioned in 1318. Rabštejn was damaged during the Thirty Years' War and repaired, but at the end of the 17th century, the castle was definitely abandoned and deserted.

The Church of Saint Florian was originally a chapel, built in 1757–1775. After 1775, the capacity of the chapel found to be insufficient and it was expanded into a church, which was consecrated in 1785.
