= Mladeč Caves =

Cave complex and archaeological site in the Czech Republic

Mladečské Caves
- Mladečské jeskyně
- German: Fürst Johann's Höhle, Czech: Bočkova díra
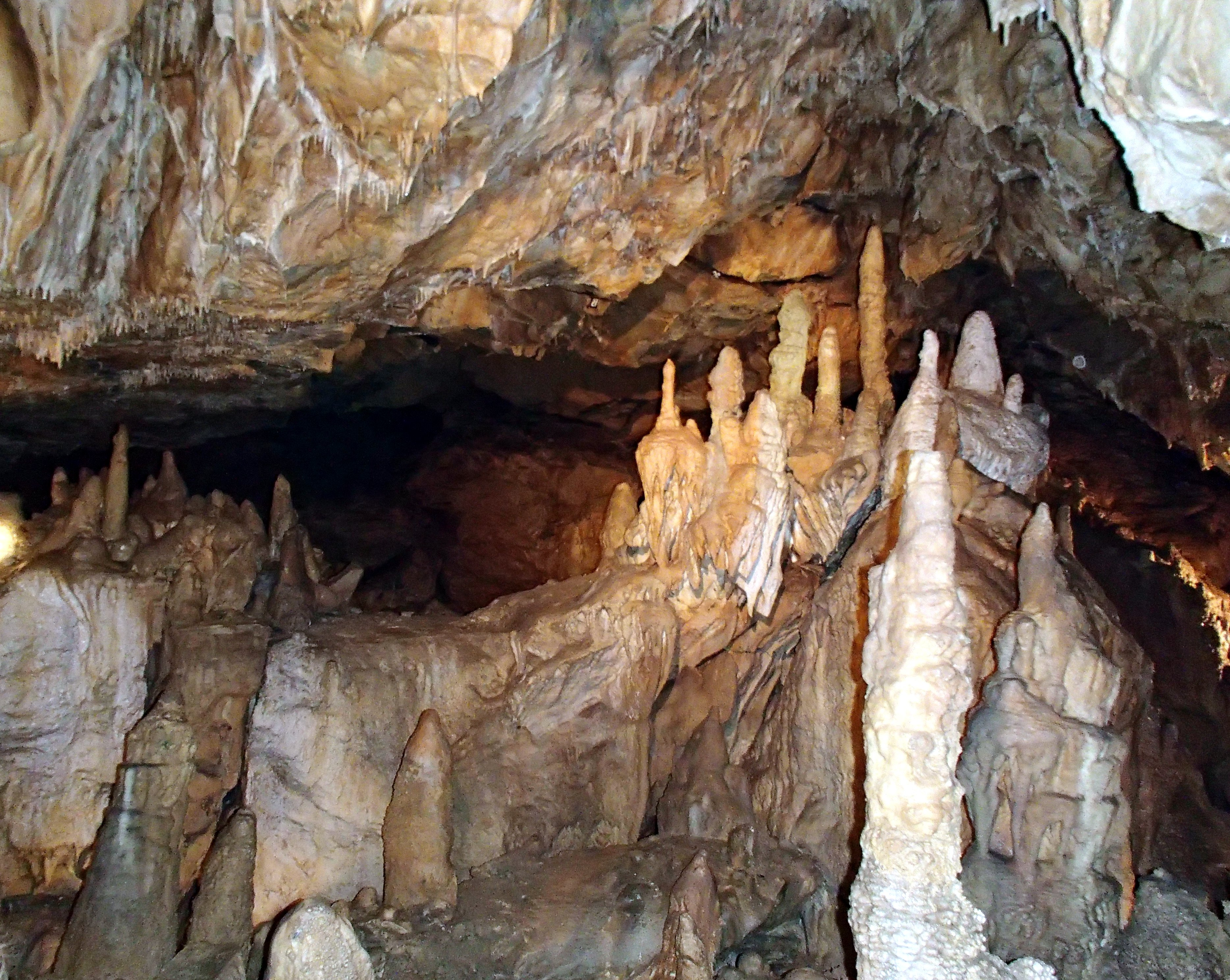
- Inside the cave

- Location in the Czech Republic
- 49°42′23″N 17°1′0″E
- Type: multi-floor karstic cave system
- Periods: Upper Paleolithic
- Cultures: Aurignacian
- Associated with: Cro-Magnon

Site notes
- Elevation: 343 m (1,125 ft)
- Excavation dates: 1881–1882, 1903–1922
- Archaeologists: Josef Szombathy
- Management: Cave Administration of the Czech Republic

The Mladečské Caves (Czech: Mladečské jeskyně) are a cave complex in the municipality of Mladeč in the Czech Republic. It is located in the Třesín National Nature Monument within the Litovelské Pomoraví Protected Landscape Area.

The complex labyrinth of fissure corridors and caves can be found inside the calcite hill of Třesín. The underground spaces are decorated with stalactites, stalagmites and sinters. Its highlights include "Nature's Temple" and the "Virgin Cave".

== Caves ==
The islets of limestones in Mladeč Karst belong geologically to one of the belts of the Devonian rocks in the Central Moravian part of the Bohemian Massif (the Konice-Mladeč Devonian). These caves represent a predominantly horizontal and very broken labyrinth of corridors, domes and high chimneys with remarkable modelling of walls and ceilings, with stalactite and stalagmite decoration and with numerous block cave-ins, with some steep corridors which extend even below the level of the underground water. They are also famous for archaeological findings. The archaeologists claim that these caves have world meaning.

Except for the entrance, the caves are not accessible to the public. However, the management of Mladečské Caves frequently open for the visitors. They have a total of 1,250 metres of corridors and halls with denivelation of 30 metres. It takes visitors about 40 minutes to go through the 380 metre-long path. The minimum for the visit is a group of six visitors and there is an exhibition of photos and interesting information about the caves. These caves can be visited from April to October.

== Archaeology ==
They are an important archaeological site and probably even the oldest, largest and most northern settlements of the Cro-Magnon people in Europe (Cro-Magnon lived here as long as 31 thousands years ago).

Mladečské Caves are a significant paleontological and archaeological locality. There are findings of bones of extinct Pleistocene vertebrates, a number of skeletons of people of the Early Stone Age, together with multiple objects evidencing their activities (stone instruments, fireplaces).

=== Excavations ===
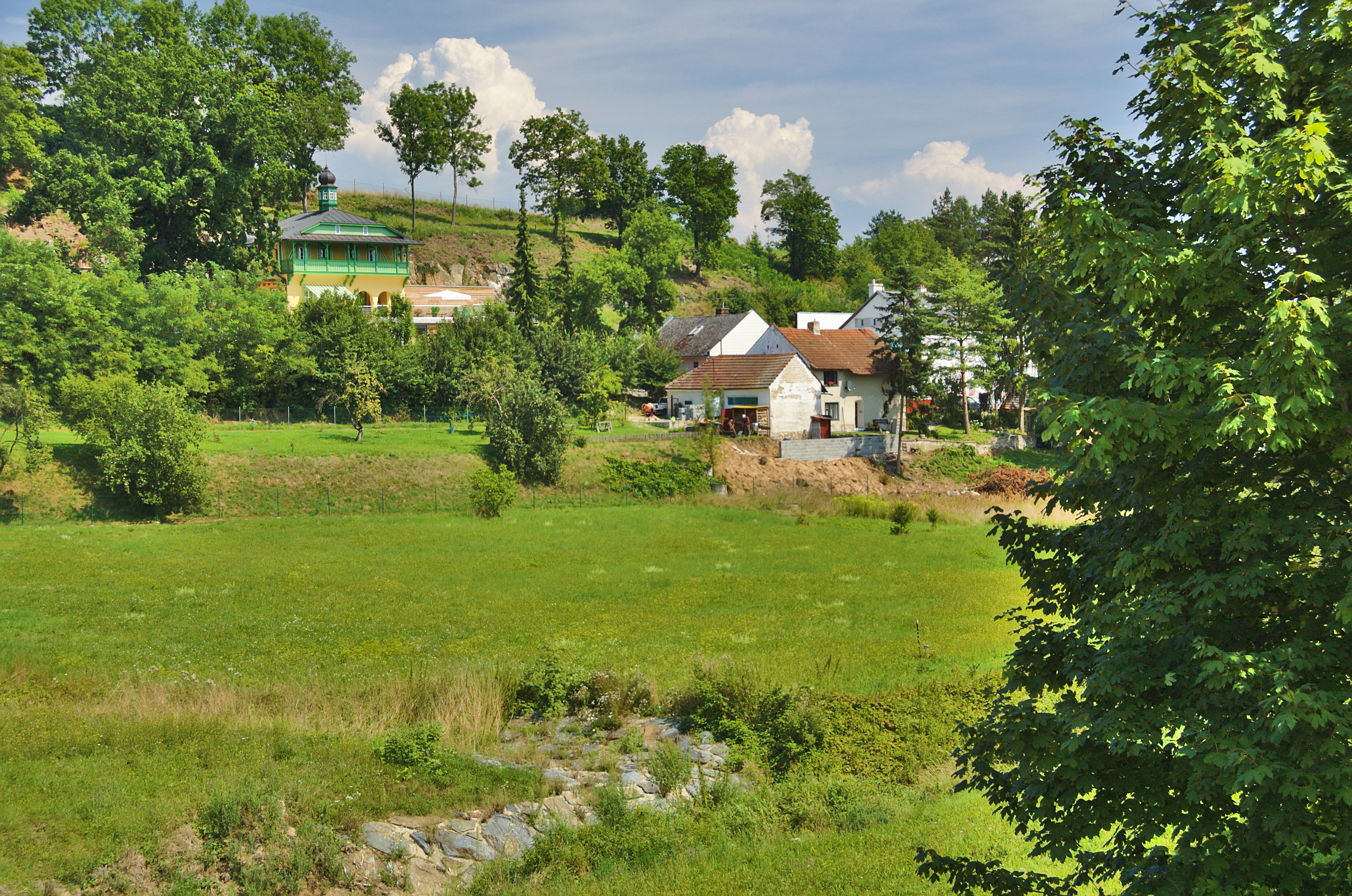
Approach to the caves

The existence of the caves was known as early as 1826.

The main cave, Mladečské Cave I, was first excavated by Josef Szombathy, who recorded his visits and excavations to the cave in his diary, a diary which is the sole source of information on the early excavations at the site. Szombathy first excavated the cave on June 7, 1881. The initial excavation ended on June 12. The first human fossil, the skull of Mladeč 1, was discovered during this excavation. Other fossils discovered during this excavation include Mladeč 2, Mladeč 3, Mladeč 7, Mladeč 12-20 and Mladeč 27.

Szombathy's second excavation at the cave started on July 13, 1882 and ended on July 18. He returned again and excavated the cave from August 7–12, 1882. Mladeč 8, Mladeč 9 and Mladeč 10 were discovered during this excavation.

Szombathy named the cave Fürst Johann’s Höhle in honor of Johann II, Prince of Liechtenstein, who owned the land where the cave was located. While the cave lay in the domain of the Prince of Liechtenstein, the cave also partially lay in the fields of a local villager, A. Nevrlý. Thus, the parts that lay in A. Nevrlý's fields were ceded to him.

In 1902, A. Nevrlý built a wall to separate the Liechtenstein entrance from the cave and began to excavate a new entrance to the cave. Along with Jan Knies, a local schoolteacher and amateur archaeologist, the two began to excavate the cave. Mladeč 39-41 and Mladeč 88-91 were discovered by Knies.

On March 22, 1904, a second cave, the Quarry Cave (Mladečské Cave II) was discovered near the main site by quarry workers and subsequently destroyed. The workers found three human skulls, which were likely to have been Mladeč 5, Mladeč 6 and Mladeč 46. The discovery of human fossils was big news at the time in the Austro-Hungarian Empire and thus attracted a lot of attention. The mayor of nearby Litovel, Jan Smyčka, arrived soon after. Szombathy returned to the site on August 25, where he was presented with the new fossil finds.

In 1911, the Museum Society in Litovel took over ownership of the caves. Szombathy's next visit to the site occurred in 1925. In the intervening years, the Museum Society in Litovel, under the supervision of Jan Smyčka, ordered the removal of large amounts of sediment from the Mladečské Caves without the guidance of archaeologists, destroying a lot of valuable potential information on the cave. This was done in order to make the caves accessible for public viewing; the removal of large amounts of sediment allowed for the building of stairs and paved floors for visitors to the caves.

The last significant fossil finds were discovered in 1922.

=== Discoveries ===
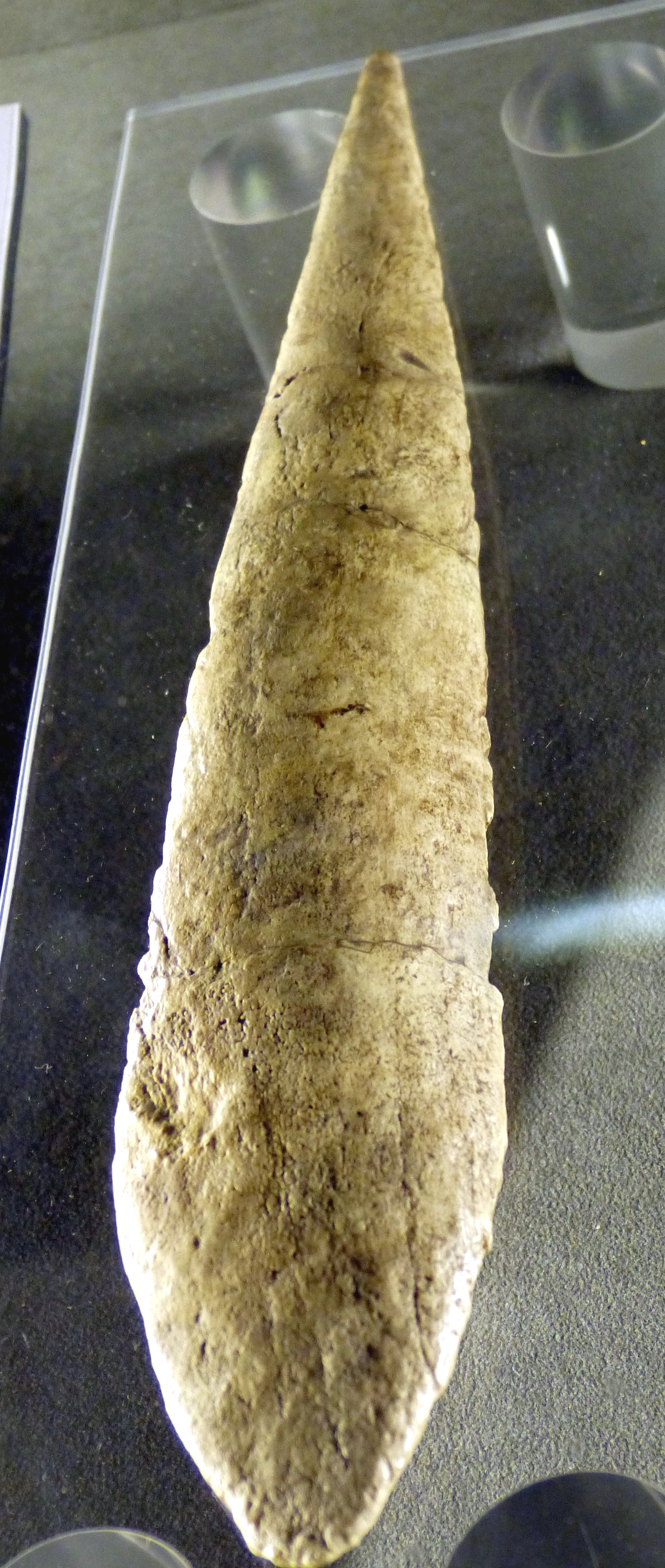
A bone point from Mladečské Caves, Vienna Museum of Natural History

Many of the discoveries at Mladeč have been lost or destroyed over time, due to unauthorized looting and excavations, disappearances into private collections, and the large destruction of artefacts stored at Mikulov Castle, which was set on fire by the Germans at the end of World War II. Ironically, the anthropological collection from the Moravské zemské muzeum, which included a large collection of fossil artefacts from Mladeč, had been moved to Mikulov Castle during the war for safekeeping purposes. Out of the 60 human fossils from Mladeč stored at Mikulov Castle, only 5 could be recovered following the fire.

Osteological and lithic artefacts were discovered at Mladeč. 40 bone points were discovered, while only a few stone artefacts were discovered.

==== Mladeč-type bone points ====
The bone points at Mladeč have been found at other Central European sites in an Aurignacian context. None of the bone points from Mladeč have a split base, and in fact have a massive base. These artefacts are referred to as Mladeč-type bone points or bone projectiles. When found at other sites with split base bone points occurring in a separate layer, the layer with Mladeč-type bone points is always found above the layer with split base bone points. The Mladeč-type bone points appear in an Aurignacian context after 40,000 BP.

==== Other artefacts ====
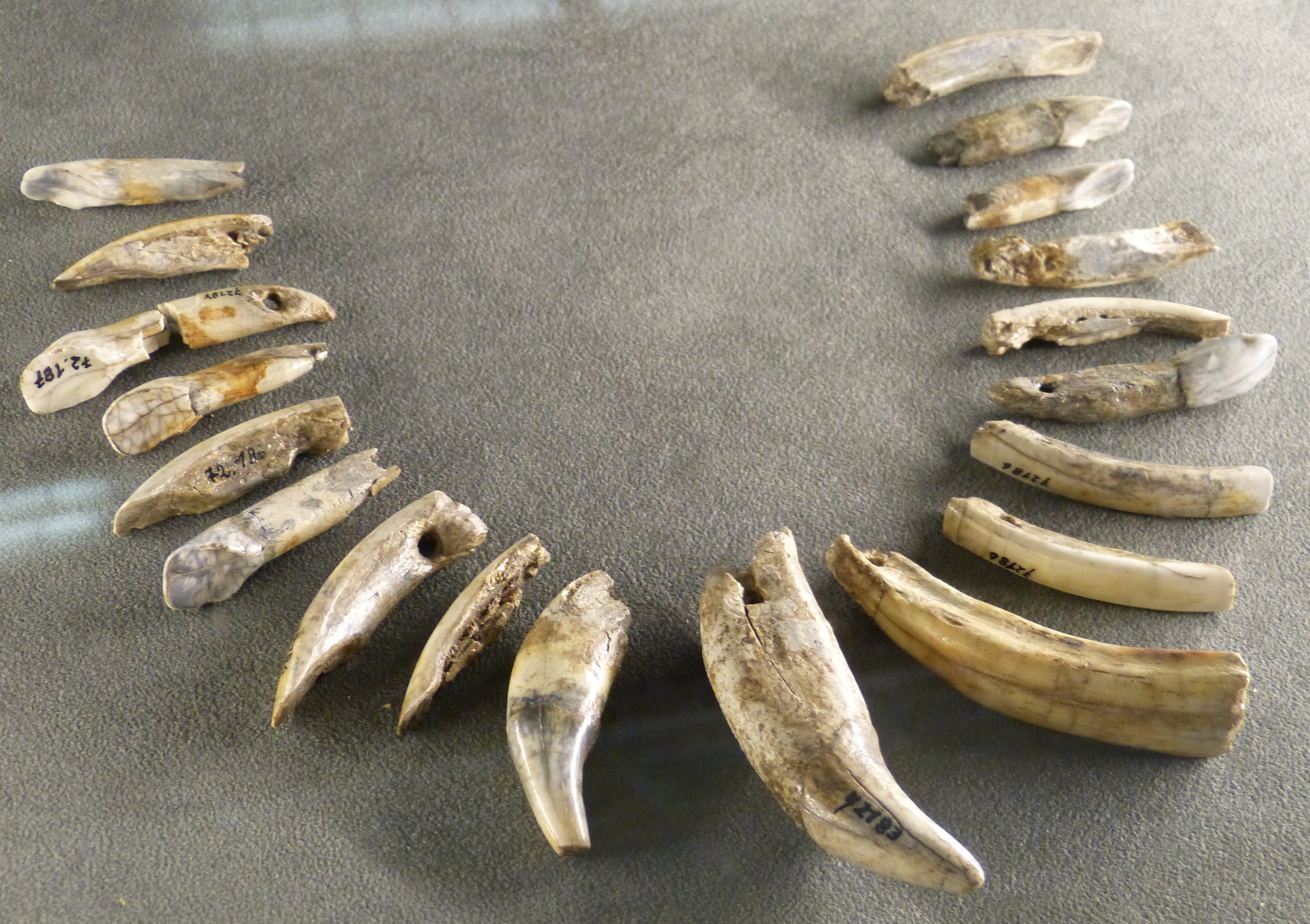
Perforated pendants from Mladečské Caves, Vienna Museum of Natural History

22 perforated mammalian teeth were also discovered; these teeth were likely used as pendants. Perforated animal teeth used as pendants are frequently found at Aurignacian sites. The perforated teeth from Mladeč came from wolves, bears, and uncommonly, beavers and moose.

Out of the limited lithic artefacts from Mladeč, only one can clearly be ascribed as Aurignacian. The remains of carbonized rope were also discovered in 1882 by Szombathy. In 1981, archaeologists discovered ochre-colored marks on some of the walls at Mladeč.

Today, the assemblage of fossils from Mladeč is split among several museums. Szombathy's collection is stored in the Vienna Museum of Natural History, while Jan Knies' collection is stored in the Moravské zemské muzeum.

=== Fauna ===
632 bones from large mammals remain from the fossil assemblage discovered at Mladeč. The large mammal remains at Mladeč come primarily from bovids (primarily steppe bison, but a few from aurochs), bears (primarily Ursus deningeri, but a few from Ursus spelaeus), reindeer, horses and wolves.

=== Human fossils ===
More than 100 human fossil fragments were discovered at Mladeč.

Researchers failed to extract usable DNA from the Mladeč human fossils for the purposes of a DNA analysis. However, two (out of twelve) of the Mladeč specimens, Mladeč 2 and Mladeč 25c, yielded a limited amount of mtDNA, which did not contain Neanderthal mtDNA sequences.

=== Dating ===
Direct AMS dating of the human fossils from Mladeč yielded uncalibrated dates of around 31,190 BP for Mladeč 1, 31,320 BP for Mladeč 2, 30,680 BP for Mladeč 8 and 26,330 BP for Mladeč 25c.
