= Šumvald =

- Municipality
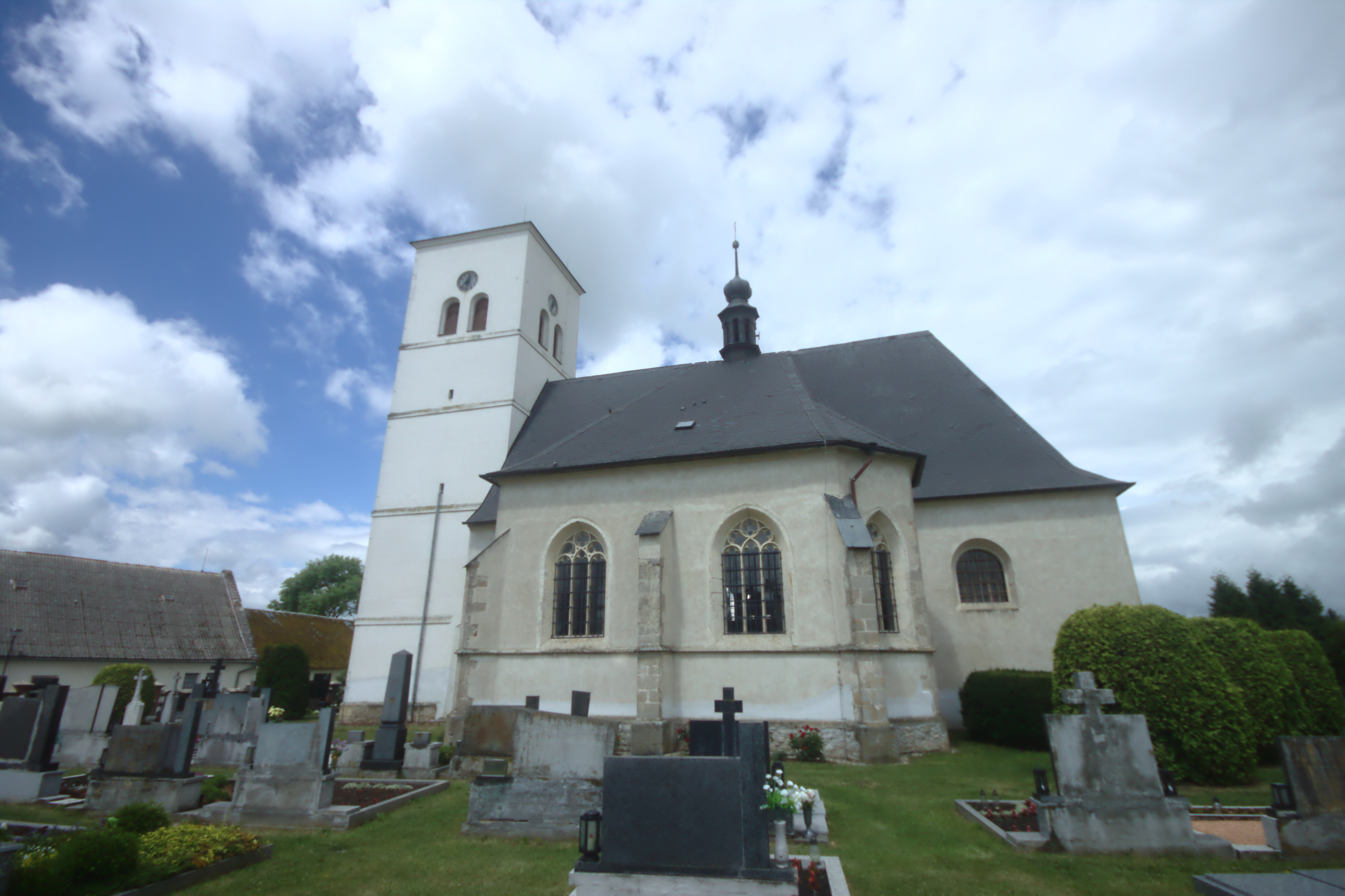
- Church of Saint Nicholas

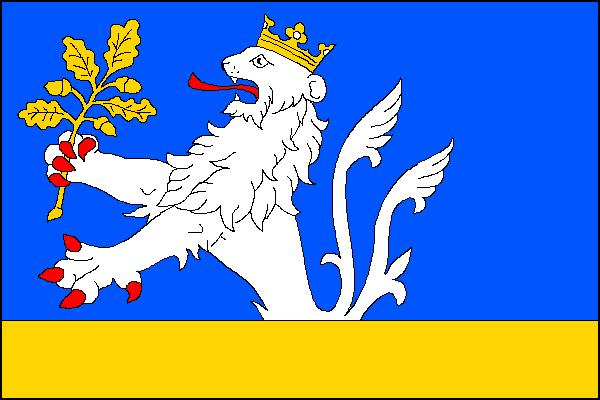
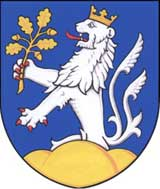
- Flag Coat of arms

- Location in the Czech Republic
- Coordinates: 49°49′52″N 17°7′58″E
- Country: Czech Republic
- Region: Olomouc
- District: Olomouc
- First mentioned: 1272

Area
  - Total: 21.01 km^{2} (8.11 sq mi)
- Elevation: 306 m (1,004 ft)

Population (2026-01-01)
  - Total: 1,639
  - Density: 78.01/km^{2} (202.0/sq mi)
- Time zone: UTC+1 (CET)
  - Summer (DST): UTC+2 (CEST)
- Postal code: 783 85
- Website: www.sumvald.cz

Šumvald (German: Schönwald) is a municipality and village in Olomouc District in the Olomouc Region of the Czech Republic. It has about 1,600 inhabitants.

Šumvald lies approximately 29 kilometres (18 mi) north of Olomouc and 197 km (122 mi) east of Prague.

== Administrative division ==
Šumvald consists of two municipal parts (in brackets population according to the 2021 census):

- Šumvald (1,265)
- Břevenec (312)

== Demographics ==
Historical population
Year	Pop.	±%
1869	2,420	—
1880	2,419	−0.0%
1890	2,272	−6.1%
1900	2,181	−4.0%
1910	2,059	−5.6%
1921	2,011	−2.3%
1930	2,073	+3.1%
1950	1,575	−24.0%
1961	1,689	+7.2%
1970	1,627	−3.7%
1980	1,664	+2.3%
1991	1,686	+1.3%
2001	1,755	+4.1%
2011	1,664	−5.2%
2021	1,577	−5.2%
Source: Censuses
