= Pňovice =

- Municipality
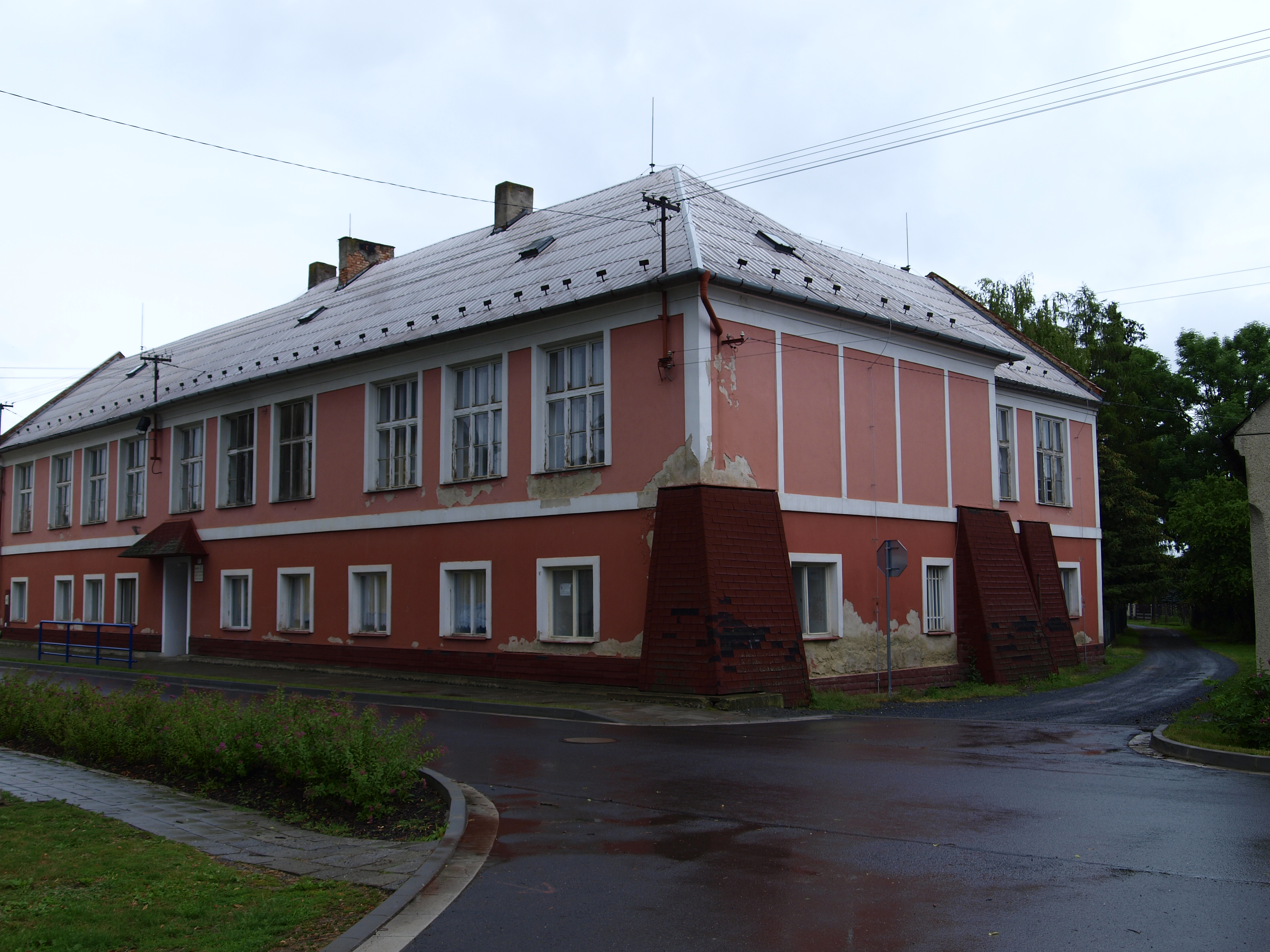
- Library

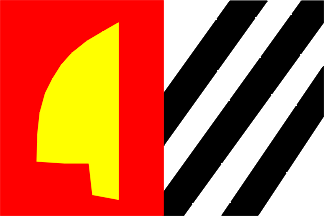
- Flag Coat of arms

- Location in the Czech Republic
- Coordinates: 49°43′17″N 17°9′43″E
- Country: Czech Republic
- Region: Olomouc
- District: Olomouc
- First mentioned: 1249

Area
  - Total: 16.36 km^{2} (6.32 sq mi)
- Elevation: 227 m (745 ft)

Population (2026-01-01)
  - Total: 1,009
  - Density: 61.67/km^{2} (159.7/sq mi)
- Time zone: UTC+1 (CET)
  - Summer (DST): UTC+2 (CEST)
- Postal code: 783 12
- Website: www.pnovice.cz

Pňovice (German: Knibitz) is a municipality and village in Olomouc District in the Olomouc Region of the Czech Republic. It has about 1,000 inhabitants.

Pňovice lies approximately 16 kilometres (10 mi) north-west of Olomouc and 201 km (125 mi) east of Prague.

== Demographics ==
Historical population
Year	Pop.	±%
1869	811	—
1880	810	−0.1%
1890	834	+3.0%
1900	822	−1.4%
1910	825	+0.4%
1921	883	+7.0%
1930	872	−1.2%
1950	779	−10.7%
1961	837	+7.4%
1970	867	+3.6%
1980	809	−6.7%
1991	875	+8.2%
2001	827	−5.5%
2011	841	+1.7%
2021	994	+18.2%
Source: Censuses
