= Lukáš Plšek =

Czech ice hockey player

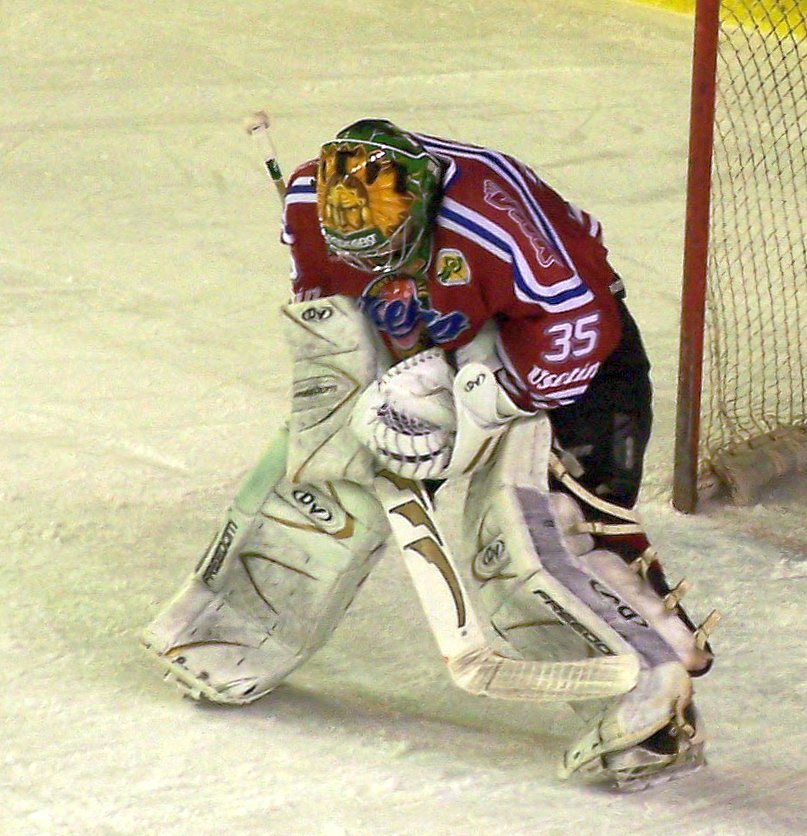
- Born: 15 September 1983 (age 42) Uničov, Czechoslovakia
- Height: 5 ft 11 in (180 cm)
- Weight: 165 lb (75 kg; 11 st 11 lb)
- Position: Goaltender
- Caught: Left
- Played for: HC Vsetín; HC Zlín
- Playing career: 2003–2019

Lukáš Plšek (born 15 September 1983) is a Czech former ice hockey goaltender.

Plšek began his career with HC Vsetín playing in the under-18 and under-20 league before moving to the full squad. He spent six seasons with Vsetín, where he was mostly a backup goalie, only playing 21 games in total. He also played for various second-tier teams in aid of development. In 2005 he moved to Zlín but only played four games for them as once again he was sent to the second liga for development.

In 2006, Plšek moved to Denmark to join IK Aarhus and in 2007 he joined AaB Ishockey where he served as backup to Peter Hirsch. He returned to Vsetín in 2008 and played for the team till 2016.
