= Liboš =

- Municipality
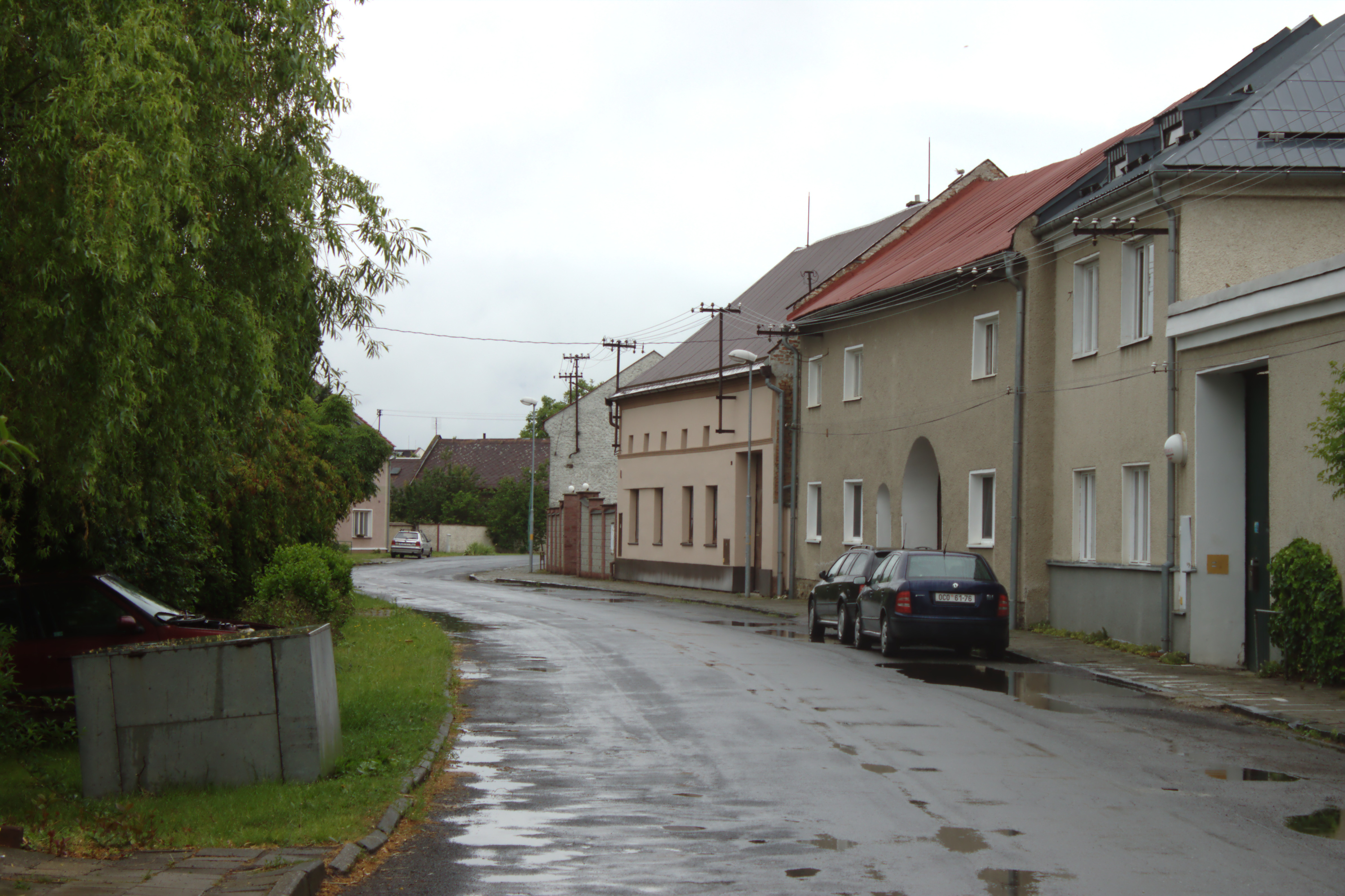
- Centre of Liboš

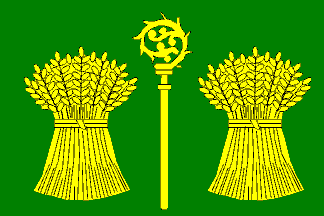
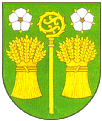
- Flag Coat of arms

- Location in the Czech Republic
- Coordinates: 49°41′30″N 17°13′30″E
- Country: Czech Republic
- Region: Olomouc
- District: Olomouc
- First mentioned: 1078

Area
  - Total: 4.30 km^{2} (1.66 sq mi)
- Elevation: 223 m (732 ft)

Population (2026-01-01)
  - Total: 616
  - Density: 143/km^{2} (371/sq mi)
- Time zone: UTC+1 (CET)
  - Summer (DST): UTC+2 (CEST)
- Postal code: 783 13
- Website: www.libos.cz

Liboš is a municipality and village in Olomouc District in the Olomouc Region of the Czech Republic. It has about 600 inhabitants.

Liboš lies approximately 12 kilometres (7 mi) north of Olomouc and 206 km (128 mi) east of Prague.

== History ==
The first written mention of Liboš is from 1078.

== Demographics ==
Historical population
Year	Pop.	±%
1869	716	—
1880	638	−10.9%
1890	635	−0.5%
1900	625	−1.6%
1910	611	−2.2%
1921	646	+5.7%
1930	619	−4.2%
1950	511	−17.4%
1961	505	−1.2%
1970	528	+4.6%
1980	534	+1.1%
1991	565	+5.8%
2001	563	−0.4%
2011	613	+8.9%
2021	602	−1.8%
Source: Censuses
