= Litovelské Pomoraví Protected Landscape Area =

Protected landscape area of the Czech Republic

- IUCN category V (protected landscape/seascape)
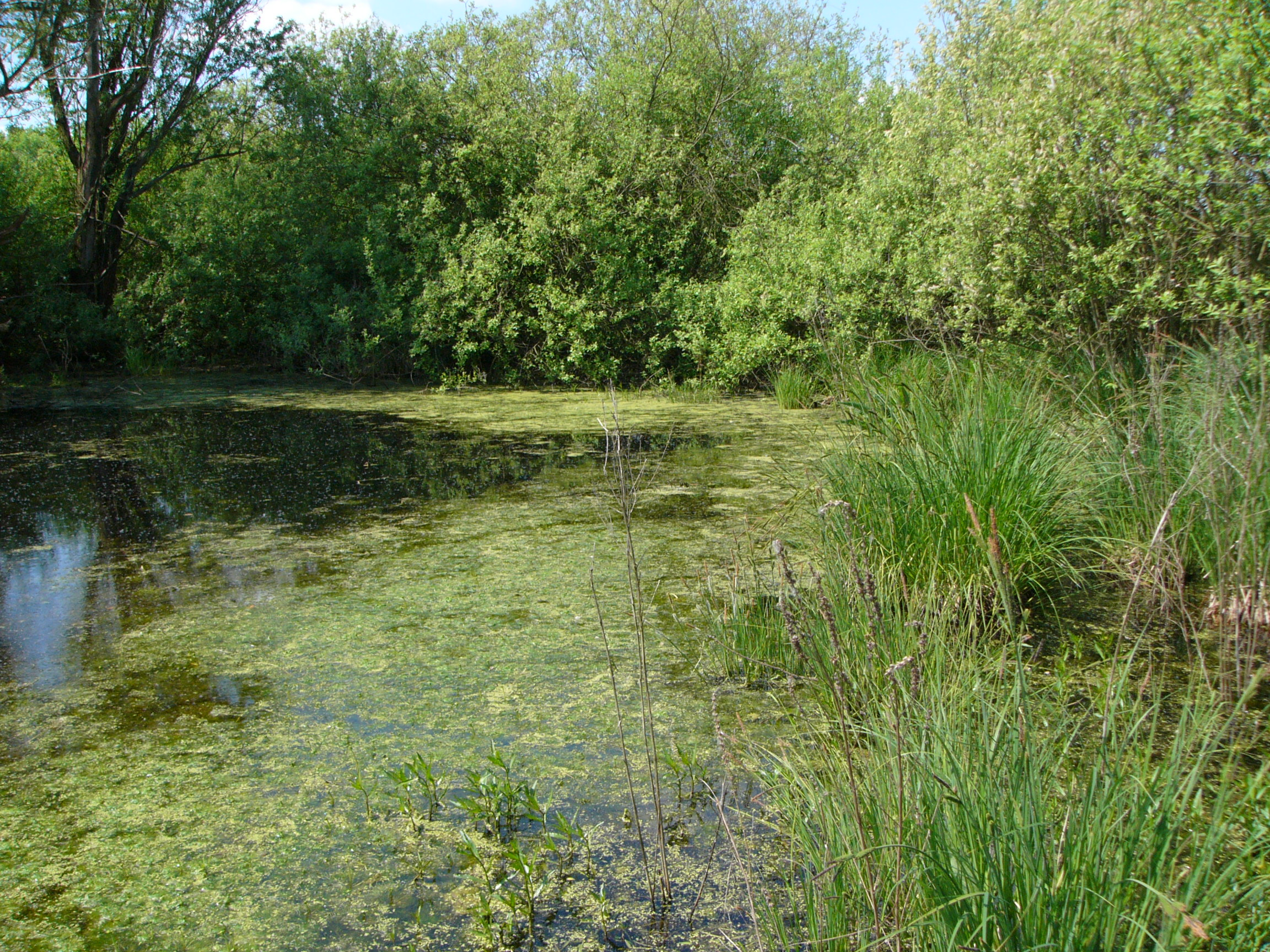
- Plané loučky Nature Reserve
- Location: Czech Republic
- Nearest town: Litovel
- Area: 96 km^{2} (37 sq mi)
- Established: 1990
- Operator: PLA Administration Litovelské Pomoraví
- Website: Official website

Litovelské Pomoraví Protected Landscape Area (Czech: Chráněná krajinná oblast Litovelské Pomoraví, usually abbreviated as CHKO Litovelské Pomoraví) is a protected landscape area in the floodplain of the Morava River, north of Olomouc in the Czech Republic. It was established on 15 November 1990 on an area of 96 km^{2} (37 sq mi). In the centre of the area lies the town of Litovel, from which the protected area has derived its name.

The ecological backbone of the protected landscape area is the naturally meandering Morava, in floodplain forests branching out and forming a complex system of permanent and temporary river arms, a so-called anastomosing river system. The uncontrollability and power of regular floods in the Middle Ages led Hanakian farmers to building a wreath of dikes around the forest where it meets agricultural land. Thanks to these the floodplain forests of Litovelské Pomoraví have within living memory offered significant flood protection to surrounding villages and the cities of Olomouc and Litovel, as they form an enormous natural polder catching and storing the overflowing water without causing damage.

West of Litovel the floodplain forest complex passes into the picturesque landscape around Nové Zámky with a set of tastefully arranged small romantic buildings from the 19th century (Obelisk, the artificial ruins of Rytířské síné, Přatelství church, the artificial cave of Podkova). A prominent scenic element here is the calcareous ridge of Třesín hill, sharply falling into the Morava river floodplain. The strongly karsted Devonian limestone of Třesín enabled the formation of a complex cave system (Mladeč caves) and a unique geological phenomenon called "buried karst" in the floodplain. In the northern part of the protected landscape area the floodplain forest is connected to the large area of Doubravy with hilly beech-oak and oak-hornbeam woods which reach up to the Úsov castle.
