= Třebíčsko Nature Park =

Coordinates: 49°15′49″N 15°53′01″E

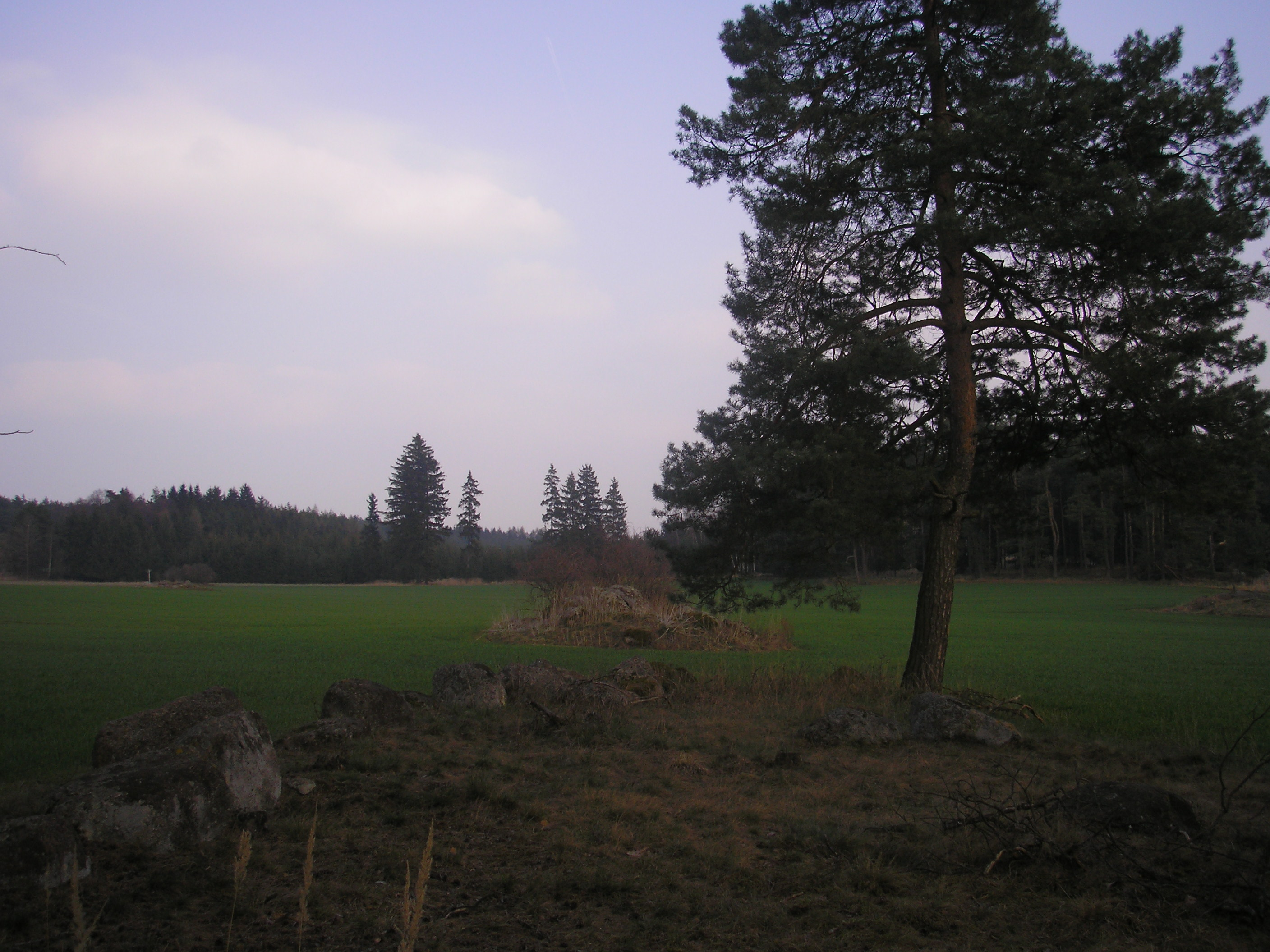
Typical scenery of the park

Třebíčsko Nature Park (Czech: Přírodní park Třebíčsko) is a nature park near Třebíč in the Czech Republic. There are many valuable plants. The park was founded in 1982.

== Kobylinec and Ptáčovský kopeček ==
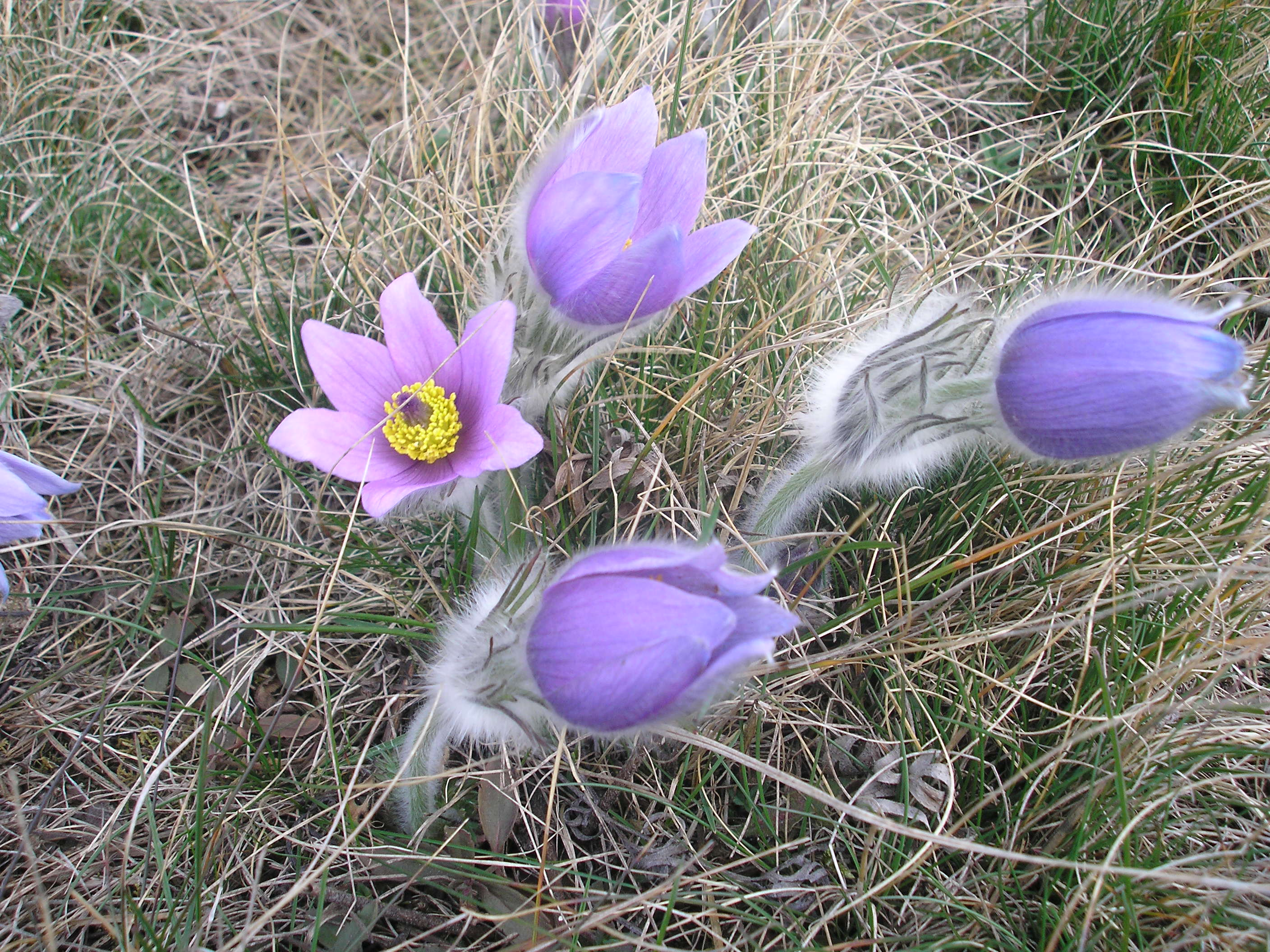
Pulsatilla grandis in Kobylinec

Kobylinec is a nature monument, situated in the municipality of Trnava. The area of this monument is 0.44 ha. Pulsatilla grandis can be found here and in the Ptáčovský kopeček Nature Monument near the Ptáčov village within Třebíč.

== Ponds ==
In the natural park there are some interesting ponds such as Velký Bor, Malý Bor, Buršík near Přeckov and a brook Březinka. Dams on the brook are examples of European beaver activity.

== Syenit rocks near Pocoucov ==
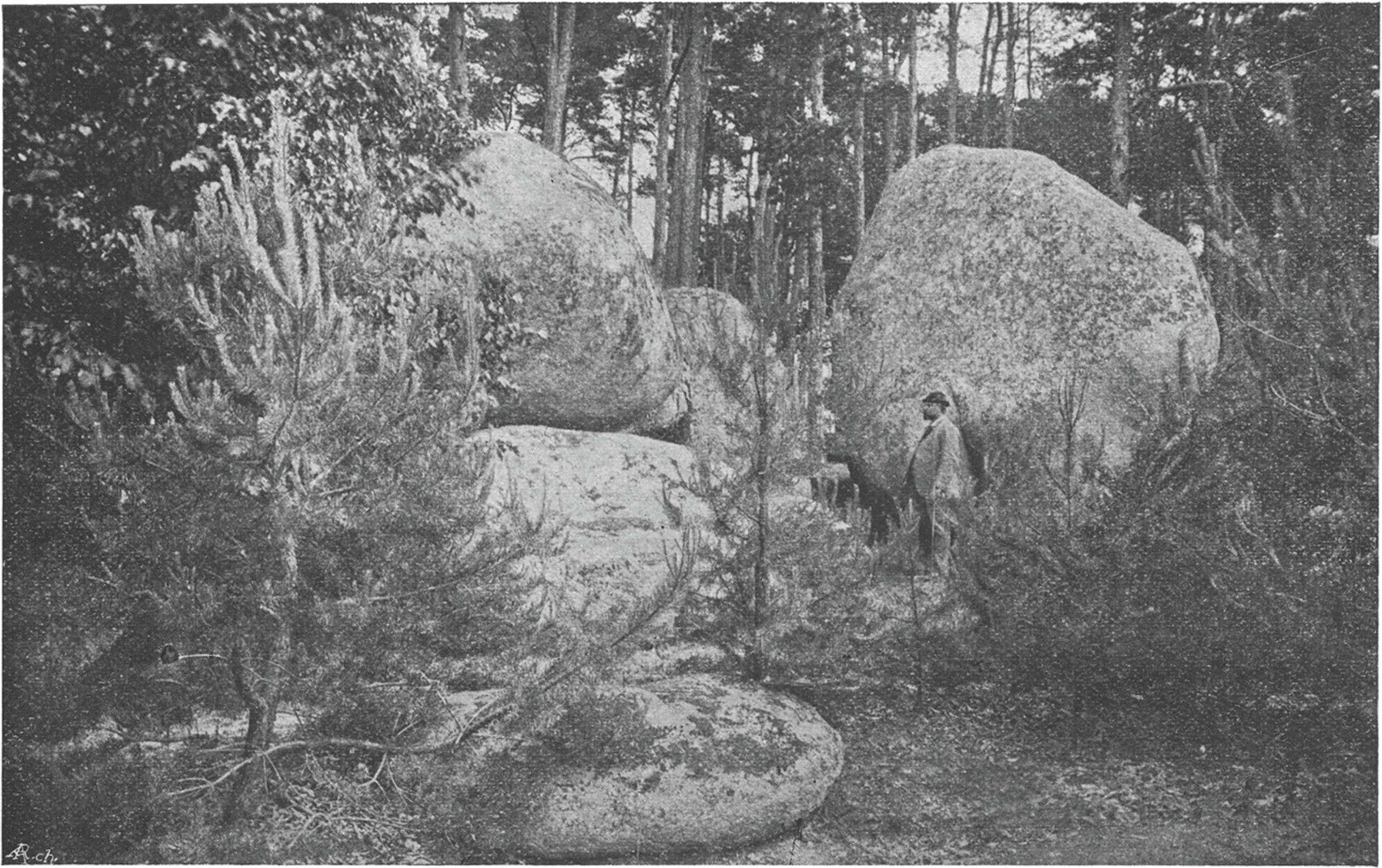
Syenite rocks not so far Pocoucov

Syenite rocks near Pocoucov is one of famed locations. "Rock formations in the vicinity of Přečkov are one of the most visited locations in the Třebíčsko Nature Park," according to recent scholarship.

There are interesting granite boulders. The area of the reservation is 0.77 ha.

== See also ==
- 1982 in the environment
