= Jindřich Suza =

Czech botanist (1890–1951)

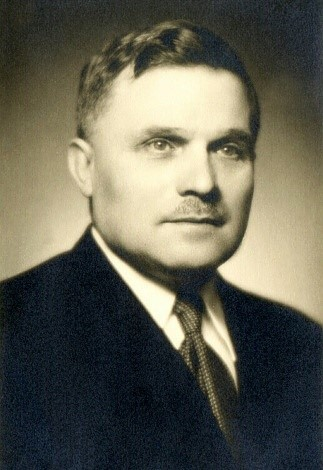
- Jindřich Suza, circa 1920
- Born: 12 January 1890; Třebíč, Kingdom of Bohemia
- Died: 14 May 1951 (aged 61); Prague, Czechoslovakia
- Resting place: Horka Domky, Třebíč
- Education: Masaryk University
- Scientific career
- Fields: lichenology, phytogeography
- Workplaces: Masaryk University; Charles University
- Author abbrev. (botany): Suza

Jindřich Suza (12 January 1890 – 19 November 1951) was a Czech professor of botany. He specialised in lichenology and phytogeography.

== Life and career ==
Jindřich Suza was born in Třebíč; his father Alois was a bookbinder and stationery merchant. As a child he collected beetles and butterflies, and had a drying herbarium for specimens. He studied at the grammar school in Třebíč, graduating in 1910. He decided to study botany under the influence of his teacher Josef Uličný and his older friend and teacher Rudolf Dvořák, who supplied Suza with scientific literature to further his studies. Together, they went on many collecting excursions to Pojihlaví and Pooslaví. Suza chose lichenology and phytogeography as his main field of study in university. In 1911 he completed a one-year teaching course at the Teachers' Training Institute in Brno (now the Faculty of Architecture of Brno University of Technology). During World War I he was on military service in Vienna. Suza's acquaintance with Alexander Zahlbruckner afforded him the opportunity to learn the local alpine flora from this prominent lichenologist.

In 1916 Suza began teaching at a middle-class school in Brno. During this time, he met another professor, Josef Podpěra, who organized botanical research in Moravia. Suza helped him organize a large documentary herbarium of the Moravian Museum, and by doing became well-acquainted with the domestic flora. After the founding of Masaryk University, Podpěra was entrusted with the management of the botanical institute, and he invited Suza to assist him. Suza accepted, and in 1921 became an assistant professor in the Faculty of Science. In 1924 he graduated as a doctor of natural sciences. In 1932 he gained his habilitation in the field of systematic botany. That same year he lectured at Charles University in Prague about cryptogamy and phytogeography. In 1936 he was appointed associate professor at that institution.

After retirement, Suza continued working on floristic research. He collected a large comparative herbarium of lichens, which are now stored in the National Museum in Prague. Suza published an exsiccata series (sets of dried herbarium specimens) titled Lichenes Bohemoslovakiae exsiccati that ran to 30 volumes. After his death, the National Museum Prague distributed the series Reliquiae Suzaianae e Museo Nationali Pragensi anno 1966 distributae.

== Personal life and death ==
Jindřich Suza married Františka Suzová (née Pavelková) on 12 May 1920. They had one child, Mirko. Suza died on 19 November 1951. He was buried on 24 November 1951, in the family tomb in the Old Cemetery in Horka Domky.

== Scientific work ==
One of the goals of his scientific work was to explore the flora of his native Třebíč region, so he returned there and collaborated with botanists and naturalists from Třebíč and the surrounding area. They were: the director of the school in Třebíč Ladislav Veselský, the economic administrator of the Wallenstein estates in Třebíč and Čechtín František Jičínský, the specialist teacher in Mohelná and Třebíč František Nováček, and also Dvořák, who was the director of the burgher school in Mohelno. They researched the Mohelen Snake Steppe and contributed to its inclusion among nature reserves. Suza published a total of 190 scientific papers in the botanical field. One of the most important is the "Geobotanical Guide to the Serpentine Area near Mohelno" from 1928. He also collaborated with Podpěra, with whom he worked at the Moravian Museum and the Faculty of Science. Suza collected lichens in Lower Austria, Styria, Dalmatia, Bulgaria, Serbia, and Poland. Many of his studies were about saxicolous lichens (lichens that grow on rocks).

== Selected publications ==
Suza published more than 100 works on lichenology, and about 200 about botany. Some representative works are listed:

- Suza, Jindřich (1925). Nástin zeměpisného rozšíření lišejníků na Moravě vzhledem k poměrům evropským [Geographic distribution of lichens in Moravia with respect to European context]. Spisy Filozofické fakulty Masarykovy univerzity v Brně. Vol. 55. pp. 1–151.
- Suza, Jindřich (1928). Geobotanický průvodce serpentinovou oblastí u Mohelna na jihozápadní Moravě (ČSR) [Geobotanical Guide to the Serpentine Area near Mohelno in South-western Moravia (CSR)]. Rozpravy České Akademie Věd a Umění (in Czech). Vol. 37/31. Brno: Botanický ústav Masarykovy University. pp. 54–57.
- Suza, Jindřich (1944). K lichenologickému svérázu Žďárských hor : Příspěvek k regionální charakteristice vrcholové části Českomoravské paroviny [On the lichenological character of the Žďár Mountains: A contribution to the regional characteristics of the peak part of the Bohemian–Moravian Parovina]. Brno: Mor. přírodovědecká společnost: Práce Moravské přírodovědecké společnosti.

== Recognition ==
In his account of the history of the studies on the flora and vegetation in the Czech Republic, František Krahulec called Suza, "next to A. Vězda the most productive lichenologist in the former Czechoslovakia".

Ulice Suzova (Suza Street) in Brno-Medlánky was named after Jindřich Suza in 1971.

== Eponyms ==
Several fungal and lichen taxa have been named to honour Jindřich Suza. These include: Acarospora suzae H.Magn. (1924); Polyblastia suzae Servít (1936); Verrucaria suzae Servít (1936); Pezizella suzae Velen. (1934); Chaenotheca suzae Nádv. (1935); Staurothele suzaeana Servít (1946); Physcia suzae Nádv. (1947); Pluteus suzae Velen. (1939); Helotium suzae Svrček (1948); Involucrothele suzaeana Servít (1953); Dermatocarpon suzae Servít (1956); Verrucaria lecideoides var. suzae Servít (1946); and Arthopyrenia conoidea var. suzae Vězda (1961).

== Membership in professional organisations ==
- Moravian Scientific Society
- Royal Bohemian Society of Sciences
- The learned society of Šafaříkov
- Science Club in Brno
