= Jejkov =

- Town district
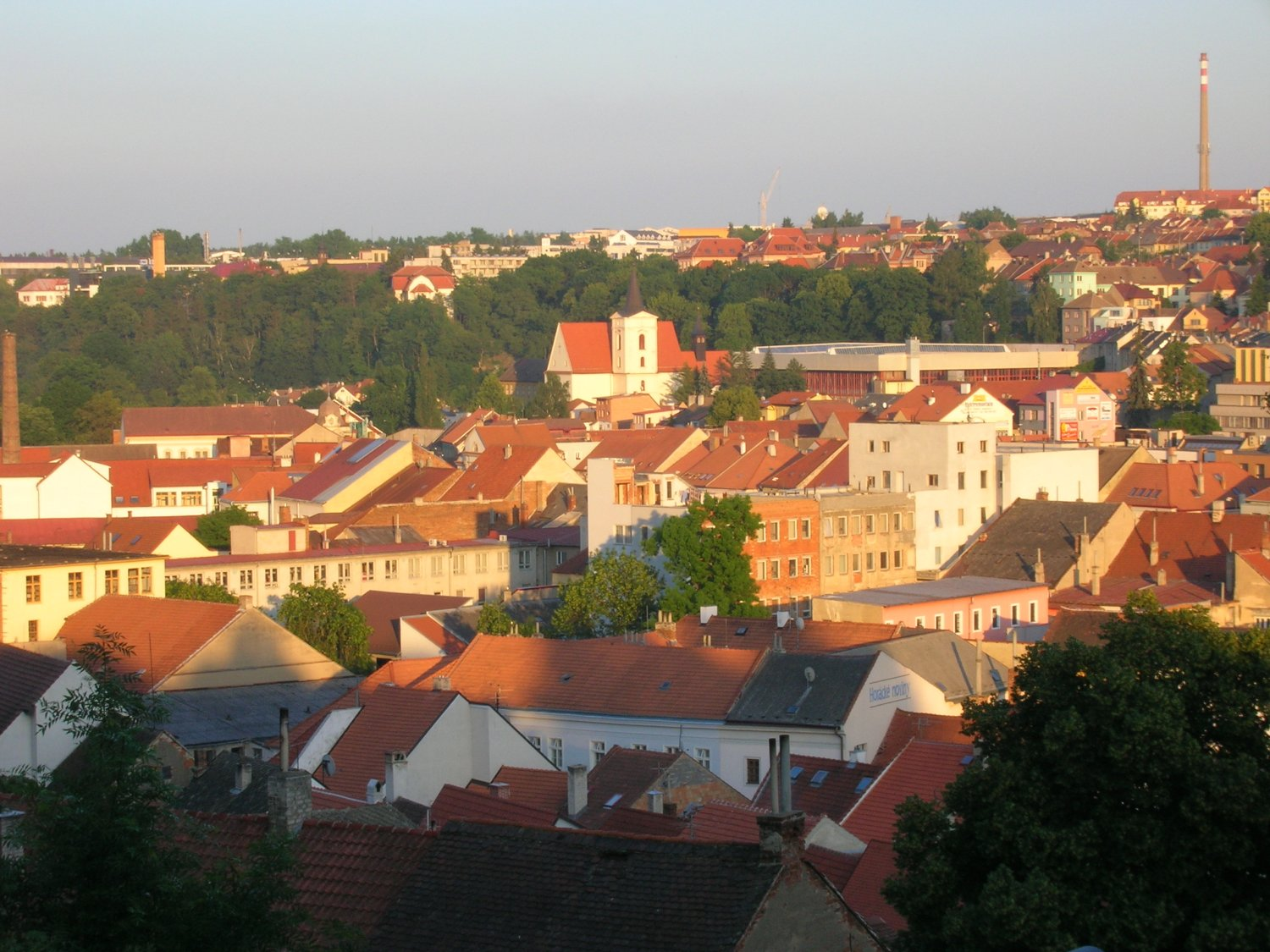

- Location in the Czech Republic
- Coordinates: 49°12′N 15°53′E
- Country: Czech Republic
- Region: Vysočina
- District: Třebíč

Area
  - Total: 1 km^{2} (0.39 sq mi)
- Elevation: 405 m (1,329 ft)

Population (2021)
  - Total: 355
  - Density: 360/km^{2} (920/sq mi)
- Time zone: UTC+1 (CET)
  - Summer (DST): UTC+2 (CEST)
- Postal code: 674 01

Jejkov is a town district in Třebíč. Jejkov was a suburb in the past. An industrial town district, hockey stadium, football stadium, hospital and court are situated in Jejkov.

== Location ==
Jejkov is situated in the east part of Třebíč south by the river Jihlava.

Jejkov is located east from the center of Třebíč. The border of Jejkov is situated here so that the all street Bedřicha Václavka with houses on both sides is part of Jejkov to the city office buildings.

Jejkov abutting with town district Horka Domky too. The common border pass a gym of Gymnasium Třebíč and crosscut Sirotčí street. The border transpierce Husova street and Winter stadium of Třebíč.

== History ==
The old town district of Jejkov didn't exist before foundation of Třebíč town, but some people have lived in right side of the river. Also origin of the name Jejkov is darkly. It can be as founded by Janík, then Janíkov = Jěníkov = Jěíkov = Jějkov = Jejkov.

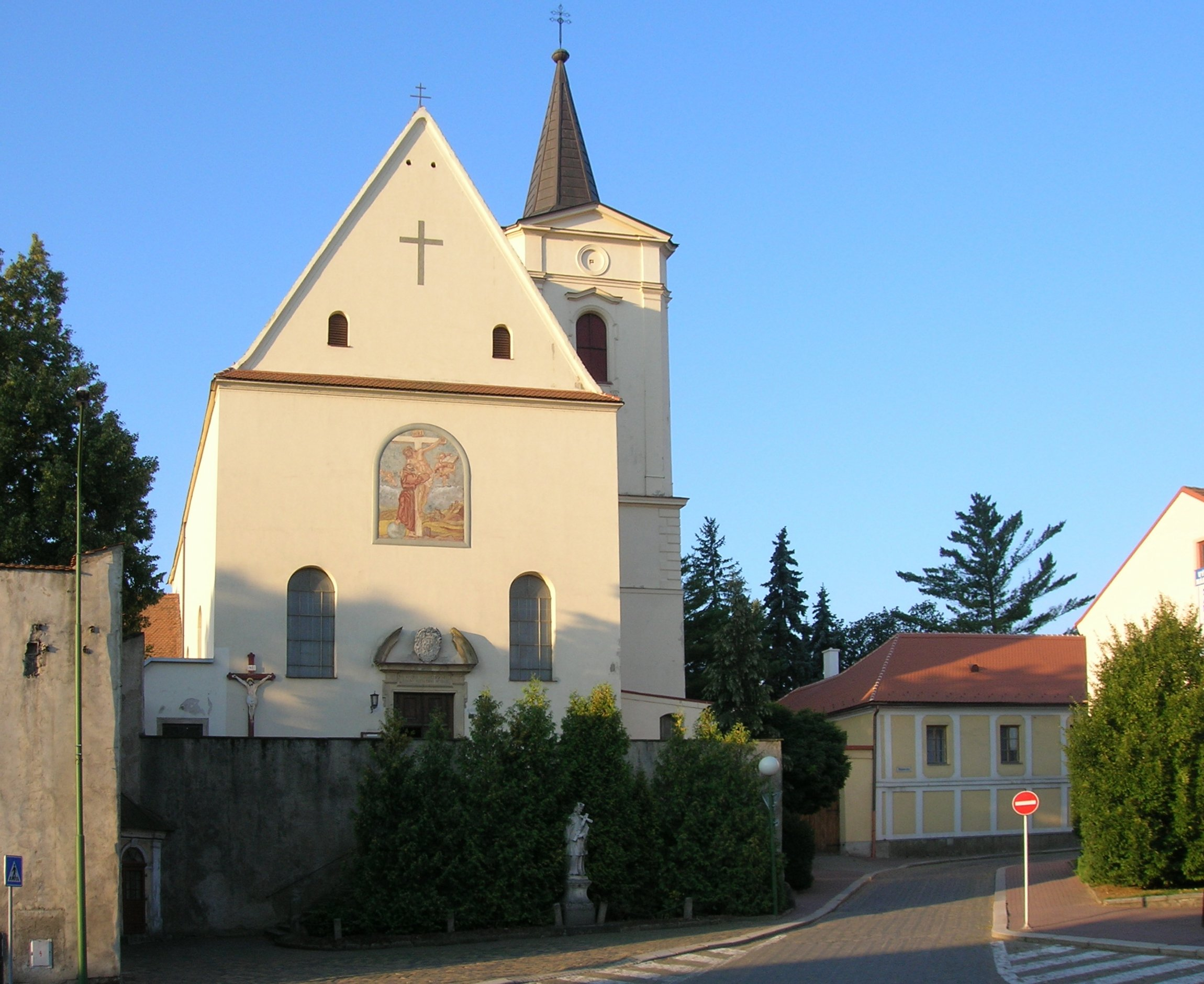
Capuchin's church in Jejkov

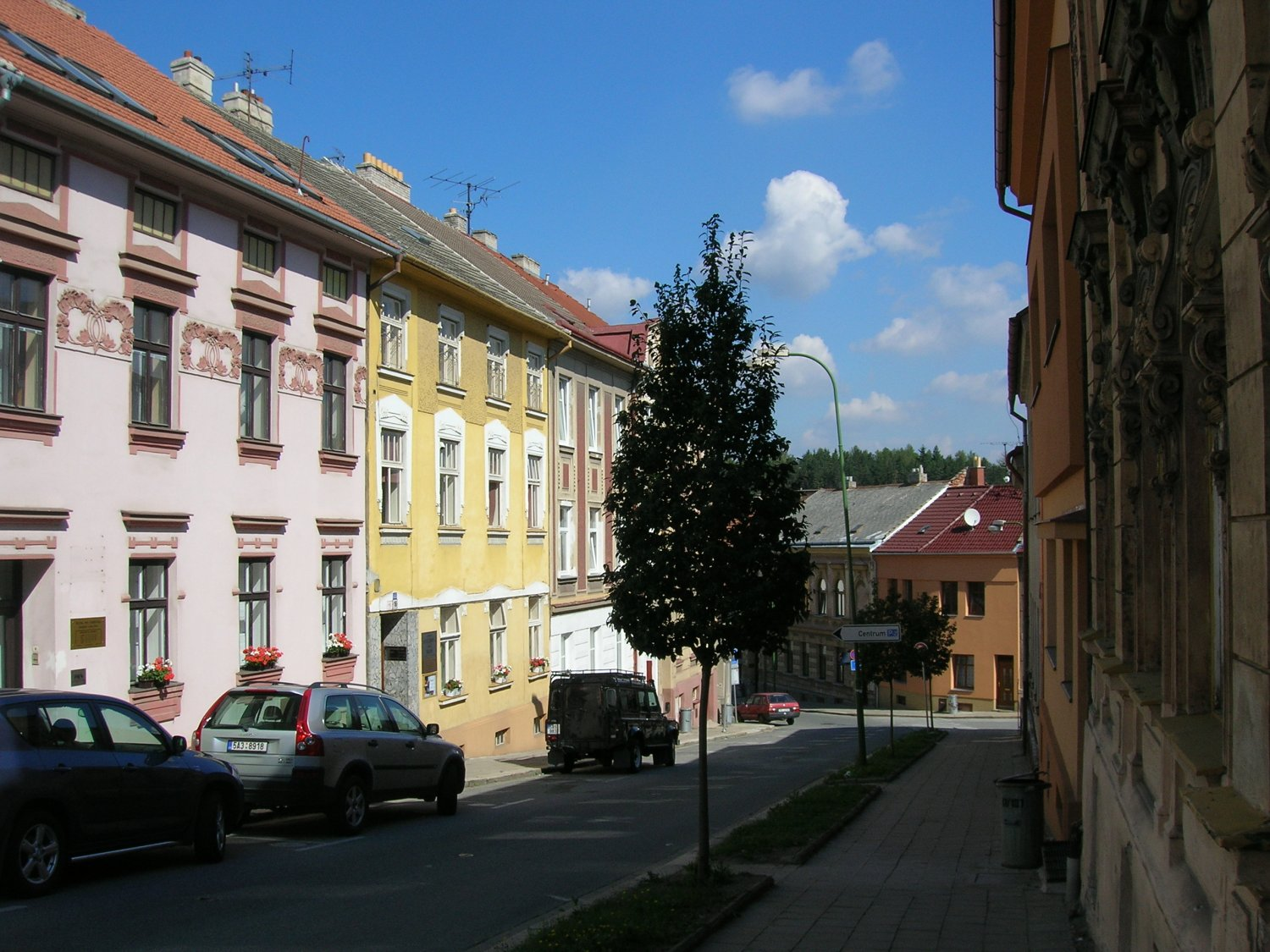
Jungmann's street

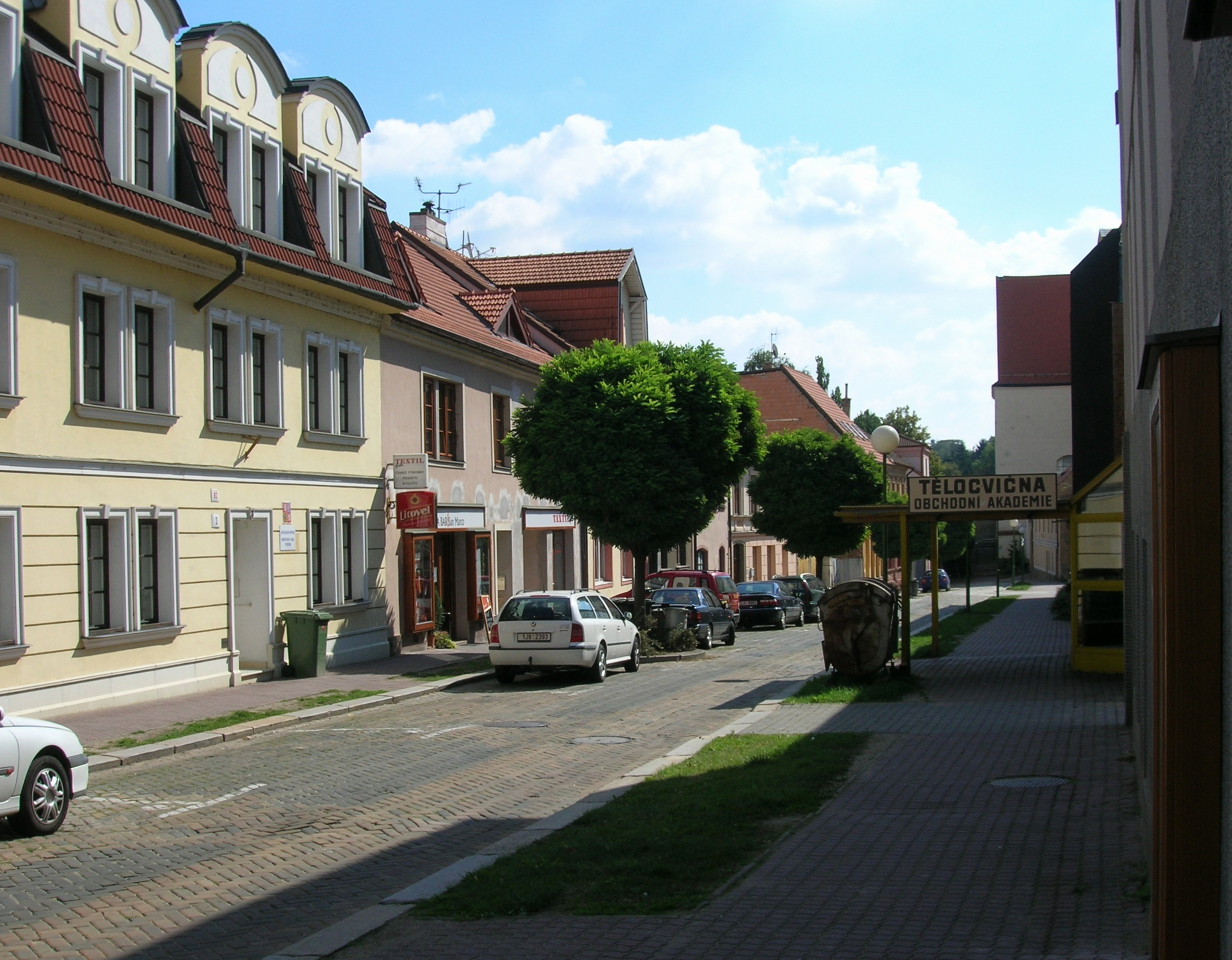
Otmar's street

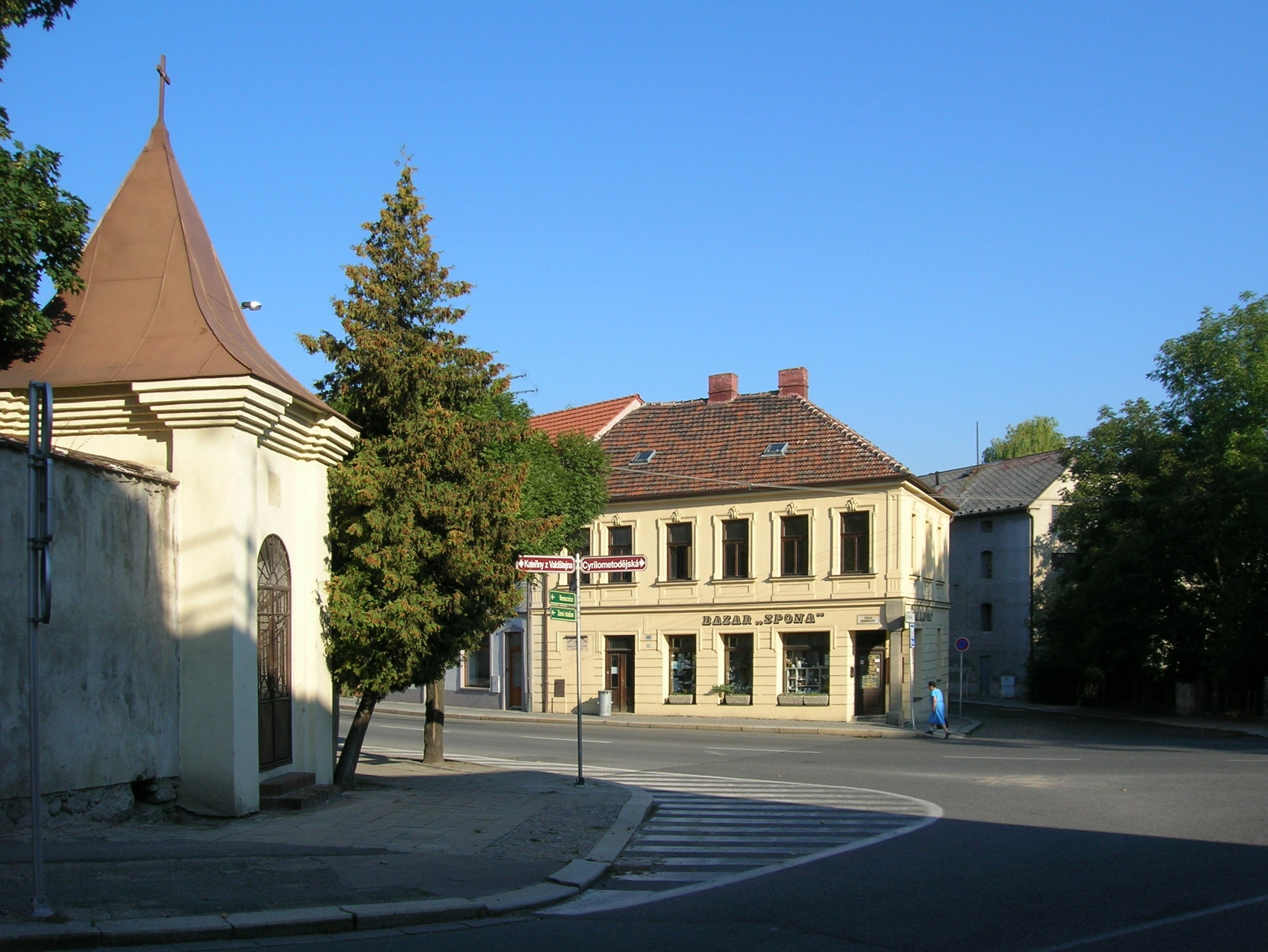
Crossing with chapelle of St. Peter and Paul

== Demographics ==
Historical population
Year	Pop.	±%
1869	1,053	—
1880	1,072	+1.8%
1890	1,081	+0.8%
1900	1,133	+4.8%
1910	1,385	+22.2%
1921	1,629	+17.6%
1930	1,448	−11.1%
1980	383	−73.5%
1991	300	−21.7%
2001	270	−10.0%
2011	366	+35.6%
2021	355	−3.0%
Source: Censuses
