= Westmoravian College Třebíč =

College in Třebíč

Coordinates: 49°12′24″N 15°50′51″E

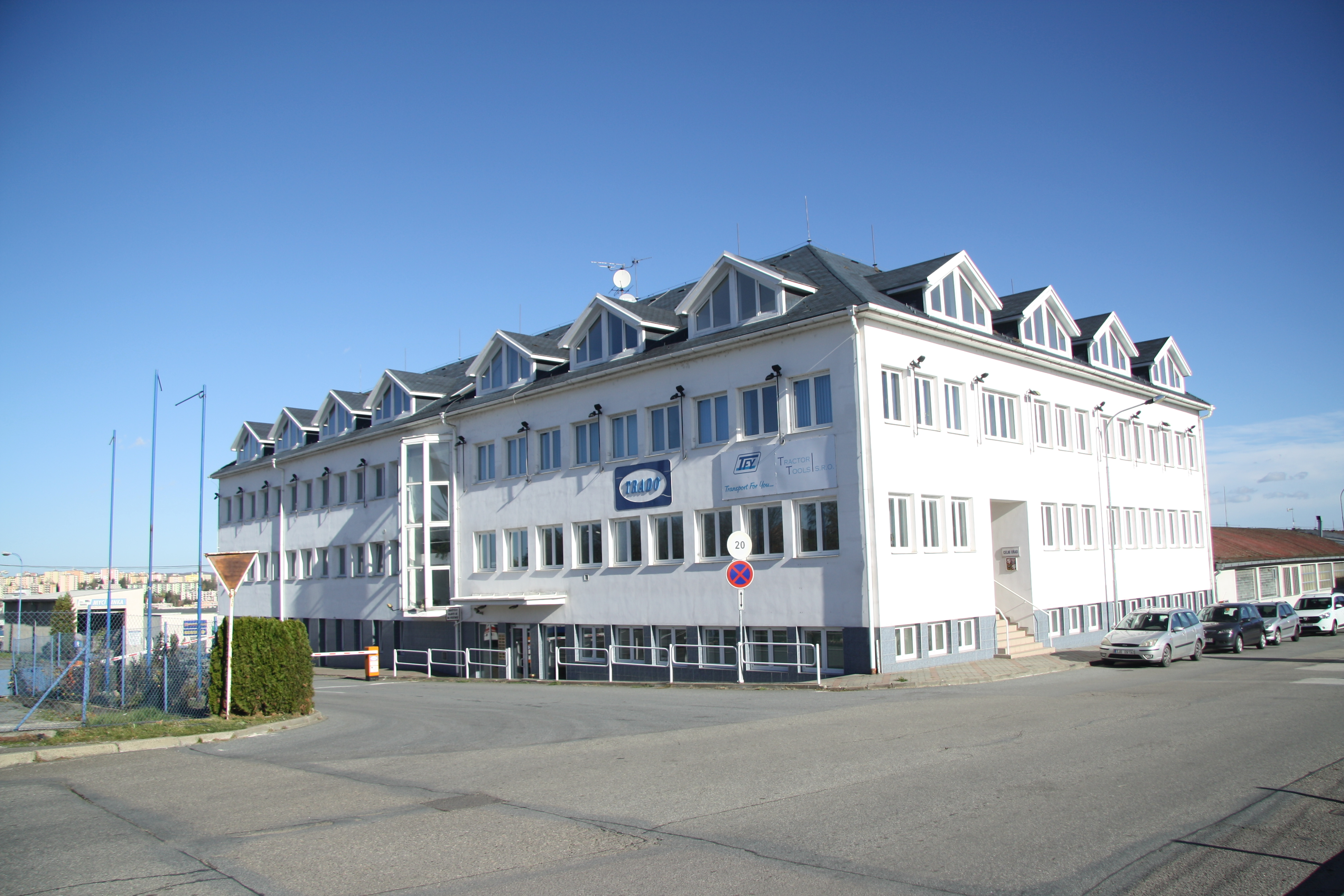
Building at Hrotovická street in Třebíč

West Moravian College in Třebíč (Czech: Západomoravská vysoká škola Třebíč) was a private college located in Třebíč, Czech Republic. It was officially closed in 2019.

The college was founded in 2003 in place of the elementary public school ZŠ Za rybníkem in Borovina. The first class graduated with bachelor degree titles in 2006. Approximately 600 students had studied at the college. In July 2015, the school announced that its running operation would be closed in a controlled manner, with the last students expected to graduate in 2017. In 2018, the school building was sold to a company which subsequently renovated the premises into a building for private condominiums and parking spaces.

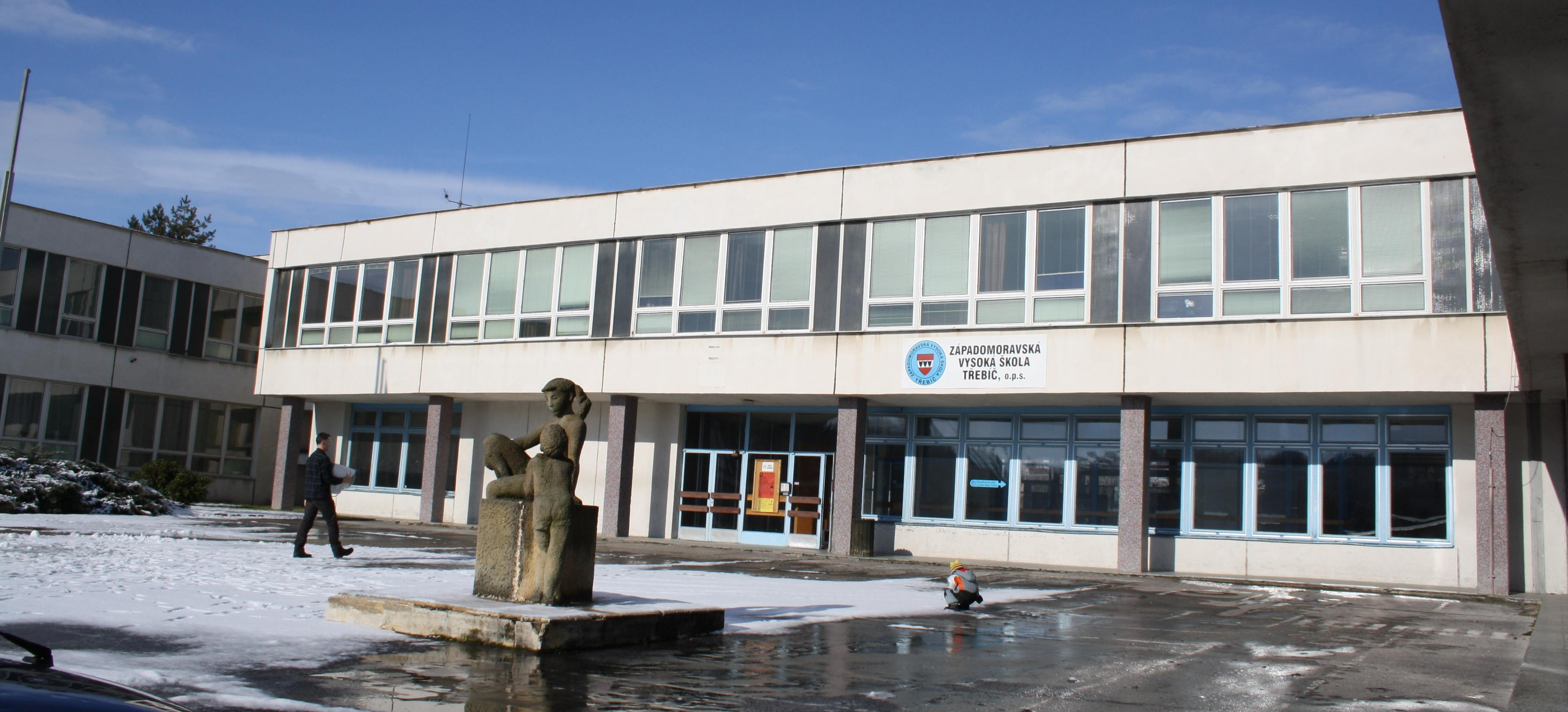
West Moravian College in Třebíč

== Classes ==
The school offered just four majors for the bachelor degree: Management and Marketing, Public administration, Information management and Applied information technology. In 2013, the accreditation commission of the Czech Ministry of Education refused to extend accreditation of the four majors due to "the low quality of education."
