= Přeckov =

- Municipality
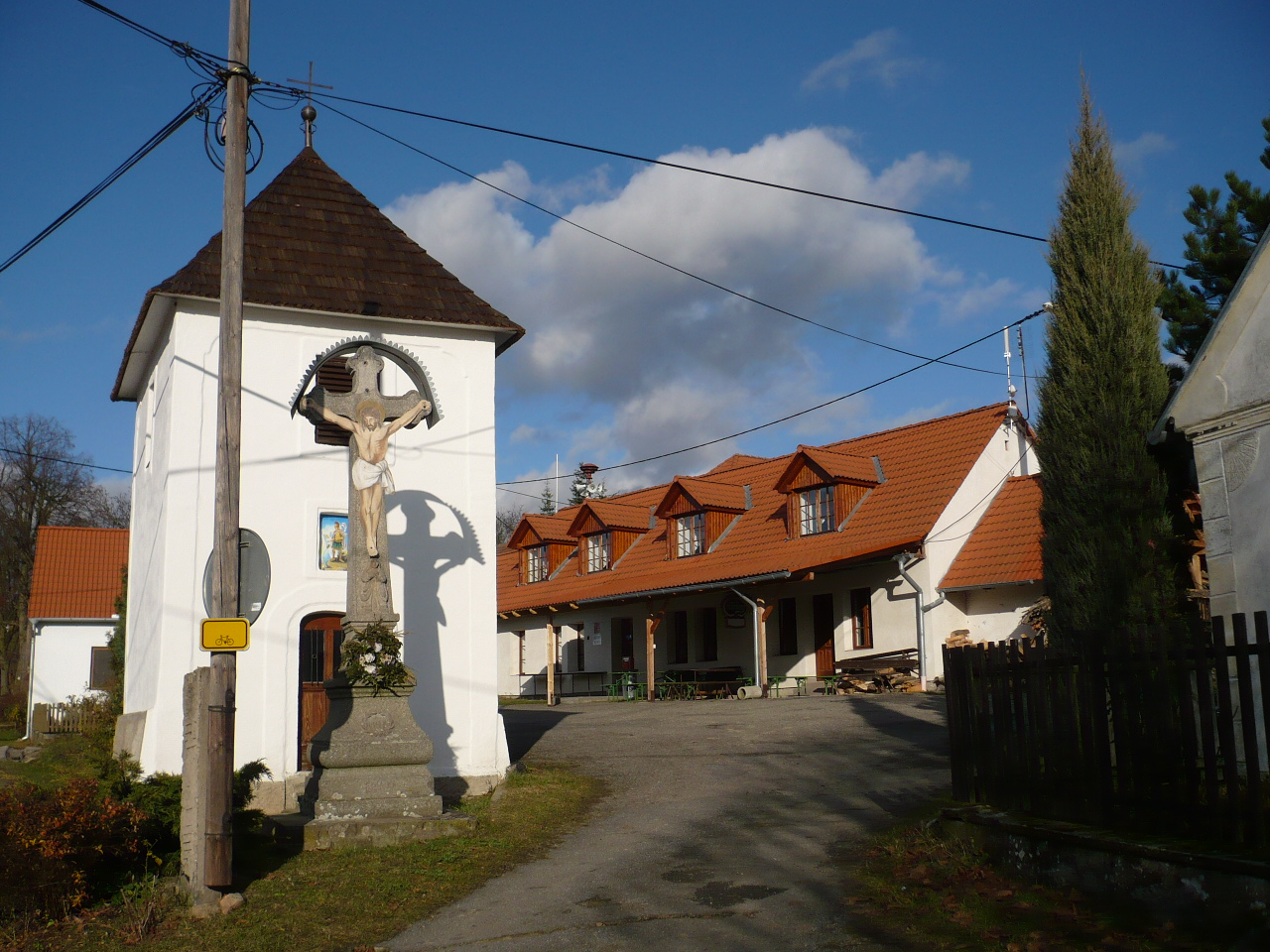
- Belfry in the centre of Přeckov

- Location in the Czech Republic
- Coordinates: 49°16′33″N 15°54′59″E
- Country: Czech Republic
- Region: Vysočina
- District: Třebíč
- First mentioned: 1360

Area
  - Total: 4.61 km^{2} (1.78 sq mi)
- Elevation: 490 m (1,610 ft)

Population (2026-01-01)
  - Total: 77
  - Density: 17/km^{2} (43/sq mi)
- Time zone: UTC+1 (CET)
  - Summer (DST): UTC+2 (CEST)
- Postal code: 675 05
- Website: www.preckov.cz

Přeckov is a municipality and village in Třebíč District in the Vysočina Region of the Czech Republic. It has about 80 inhabitants.

Přeckov lies approximately 8 kilometres (5 mi) north of Třebíč, 27 km (17 mi) south-east of Jihlava, and 140 km (87 mi) south-east of Prague.

== Demographics ==
Historical population
Year	Pop.	±%
1869	174	—
1880	172	−1.1%
1890	174	+1.2%
1900	149	−14.4%
1910	146	−2.0%
1921	140	−4.1%
1930	152	+8.6%
1950	125	−17.8%
1961	127	+1.6%
1970	130	+2.4%
1980	85	−34.6%
1991	72	−15.3%
2001	64	−11.1%
2011	77	+20.3%
2021	73	−5.2%
Source: Censuses
