= Pocoucov =

- Village
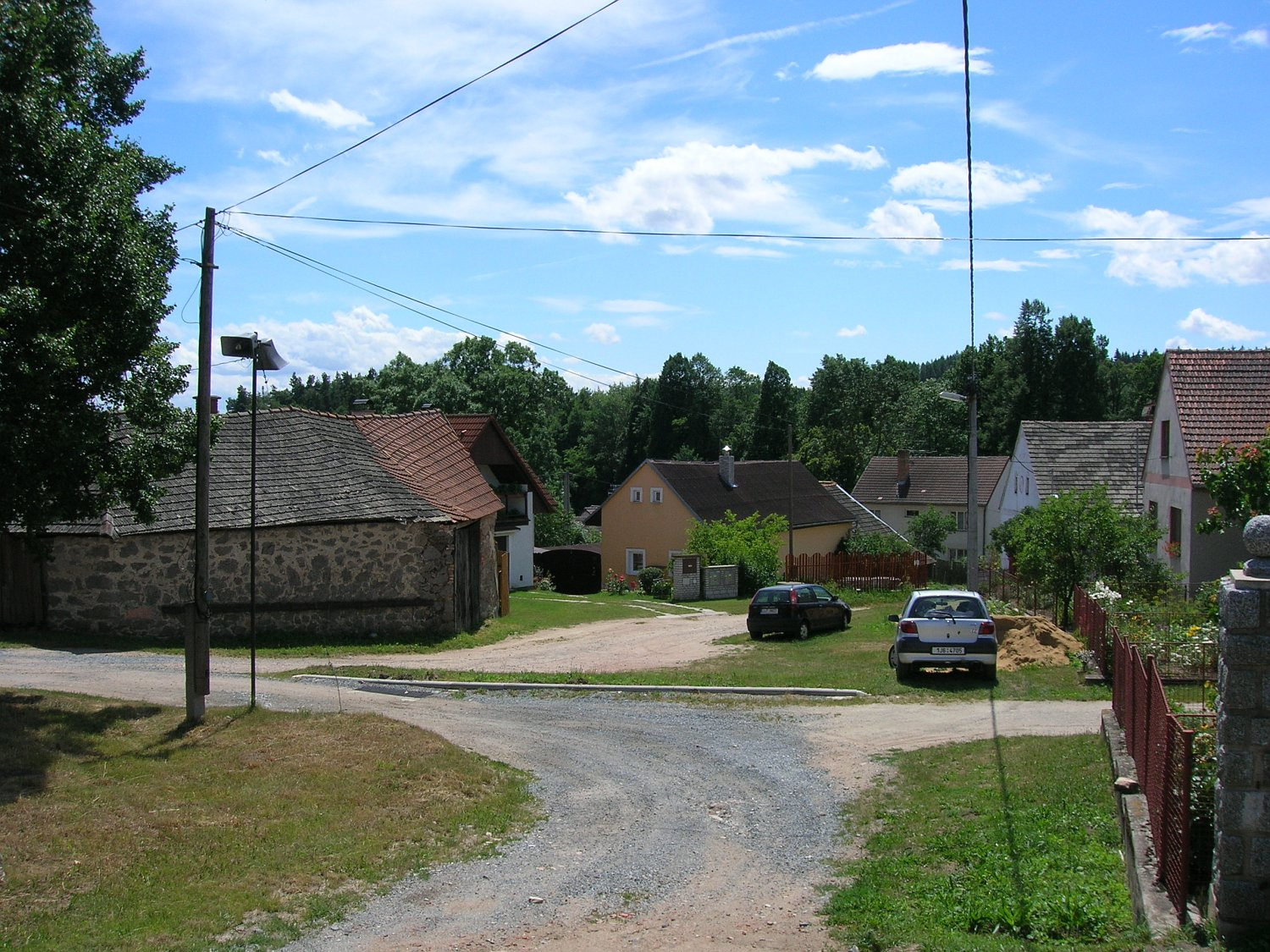
- Central part of the Pocoucov
- Etymology: Podsoudcov
- Location in the Třebíč
- Coordinates: 49°13′33″N 15°53′43″E
- Country: Czech Republic
- Region: Vysočina
- District: Třebíč
- First mentioned: 1101

Government
  - Mayor: Pavel Janata

Area
  - Total: 5.68 km^{2} (2.19 sq mi)
- Elevation: 405 m (1,329 ft)

Population (2021)
  - Total: 181
  - Density: 31.9/km^{2} (82.5/sq mi)
- Time zone: UTC+1 (CET)
  - Summer (DST): UTC+2 (CEST)
- Postal code: 674 01
- Website: www.trebic.cz

Pocoucov is a village 0.5 kilometres (0.3 mi) north of Třebíč, which Pocoucov is a part of. The population of Pocoucov is 183 inhabitants as of 2021, and Pocoucov is the second smallest town district of the Třebíč. Near Pocoucov there flows Okřešický potok. The elevation of Pocoucov is about 450 metres (1,480 ft).

There are bus stop, chapel of St. Peter and Paul and one market.

Pocoucov is one of the oldest estates of the Třebíč monastery and the first mention about the village is from the year 1101, when was the Třebíč monastery established.

== Location ==
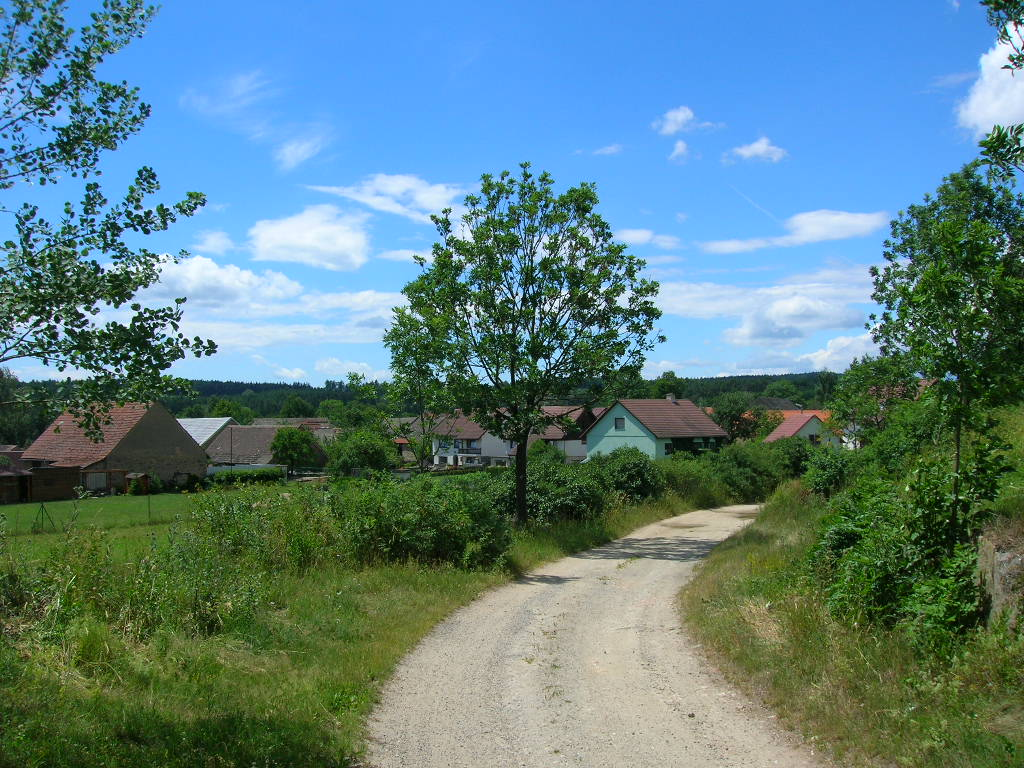
The way from northeast around the Cyril and Methodius

Pocoucov is situated in Vysočina Region in the Czech republic. The nearest town from the village is Třebíč. Pocoucov is the town district of Třebíč.

Pocoucov is connected with Třebíč by the road II/360. The road is restored now and it would be main connection of Třebíč with highway D1.

Near the village there flow the brooks Lubí and Okřešický potok. In the village is a small pond.

The center of the village is situated westward of the main road. From the common is gone three roads to main road II/360. In the middle of the common there is the Chapel of St. Peter a Paul.

In future the Pocoucov can be connected to bus system of Třebíč.

== Origin of the name ==
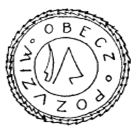
The old seal of the village, where is the Pococucov as a Pozuziw; in the middle of the seal are agriculturally tools

The name of the village is written how we speak it - Pocoucov. The origin of the name can be Podsoucov. Pod is as Under and soudcov is from soudce - it's as a judge. Podsoudcov - Under-judge is from the word Podsouce - Inferior of the judge.

But it isn't sure. Because in the history we can see the Poczauczow (1556), Pacúlcow (1558), Pozuziw (at old seal of the village) and the mayor of Třebíč was called Jan Podcaucowský (John of Pocoucov).

== History ==
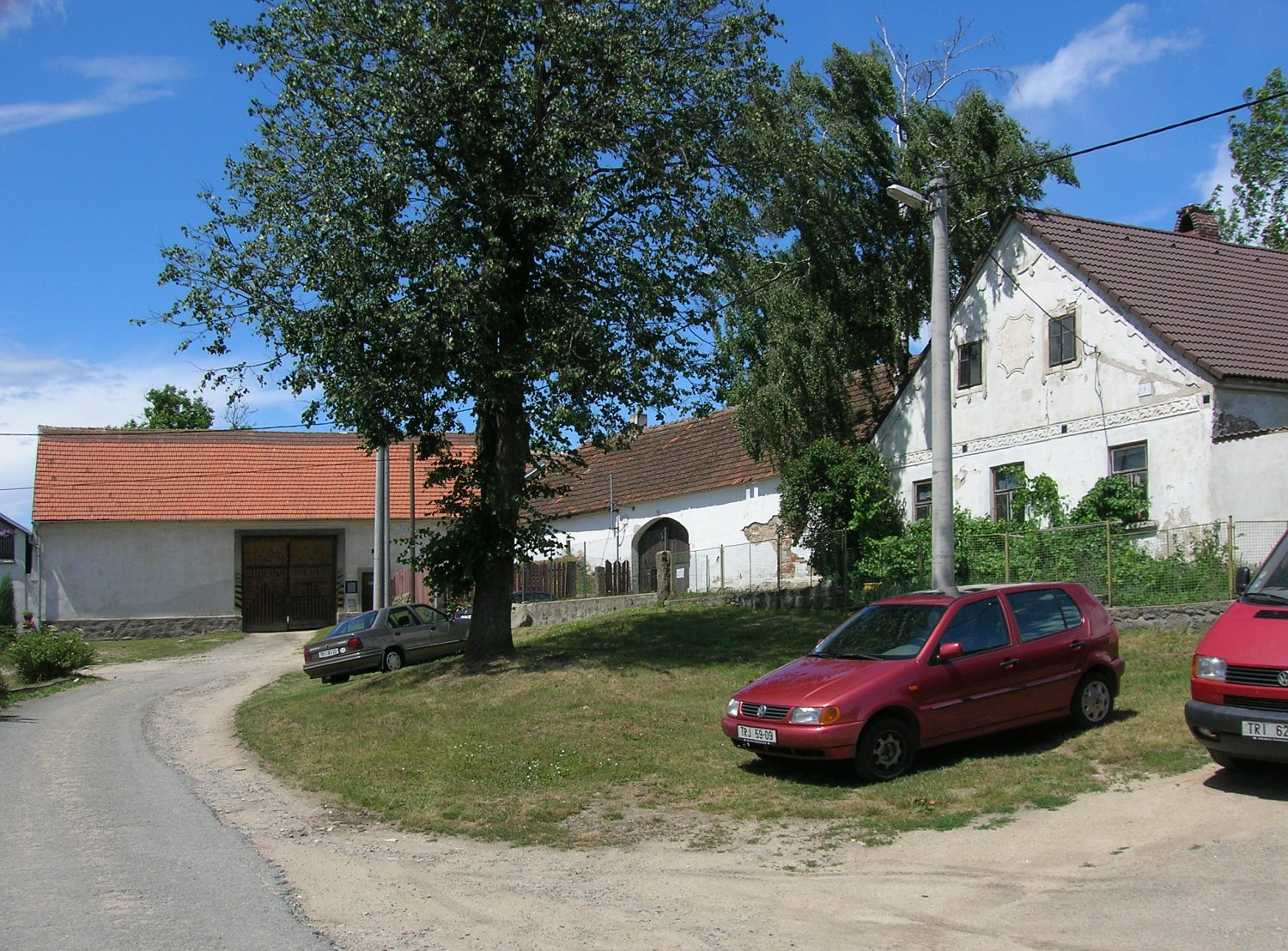
Old farm estate at northwest

From the prehistory there was found only one neolithic celt.

The first mention about the village is from the year 1101. It was connected with establishment of the Monastery in Třebíč. The monastery have two feudatorys there later.

Pocoucov was a settlement of the near village Trnava to the year 1882.

Since 1 January 1980 Pocoucov has been the town district of Třebíč.

== Demographics ==
Historical population
| Year | Pop. | ±% |
|---|---|---|
| 1869 | 198 | — |
| 1880 | 215 | +8.6% |
| 1890 | 219 | +1.9% |
| 1900 | 195 | −11.0% |
| 1910 | 198 | +1.5% |
| 1921 | 218 | +10.1% |
| 1930 | 232 | +6.4% |
| 1950 | 179 | −22.8% |
| 1961 | 177 | −1.1% |
| 1970 | 179 | +1.1% |
| 1980 | 171 | −4.5% |
| 1991 | 156 | −8.8% |
| 2001 | 183 | +17.3% |
| 2011 | 170 | −7.1% |
| 2021 | 181 | +6.5% |
Source: Censuses
