= Gymnázium Třebíč =

Coordinates: 49.2142°N 15.8814°E

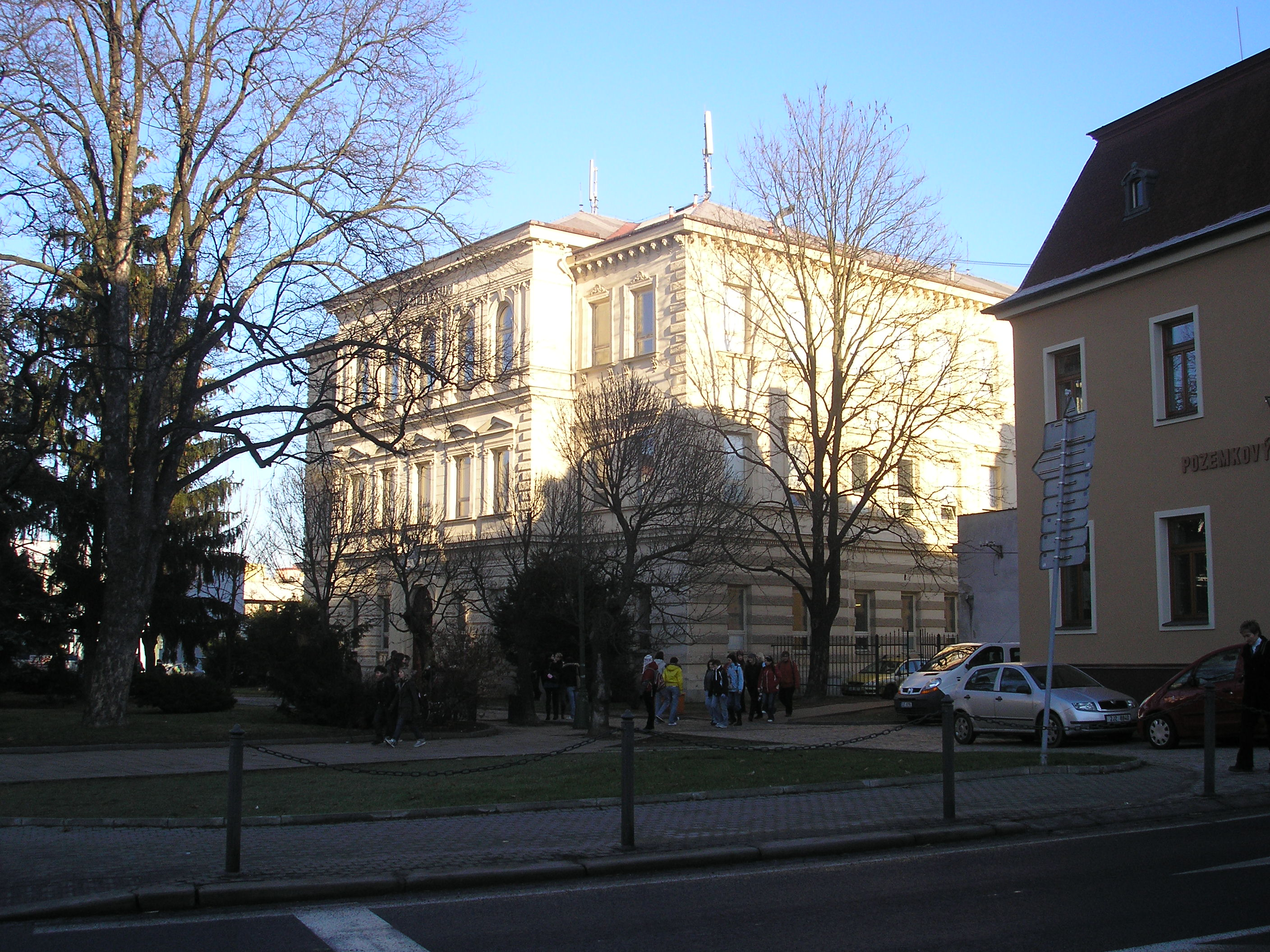
Front view of historical building of gymnasium

Gymnázium Třebíč is a universal gymnasium in town quarter Horka Domky in Třebíč opposite the Třebíč government buildings. Near the school there are also the Obchodní akademie Dr. Albína Bráfa and Hotelová škola Třebíč schools. The school is nicknamed the "gymnasium of poets", which refers to the fact that some of its alumni, including Vítězslav Nezval, Jakub Deml and Jan Zahradníček, were poets.

== History ==
=== Establishment ===
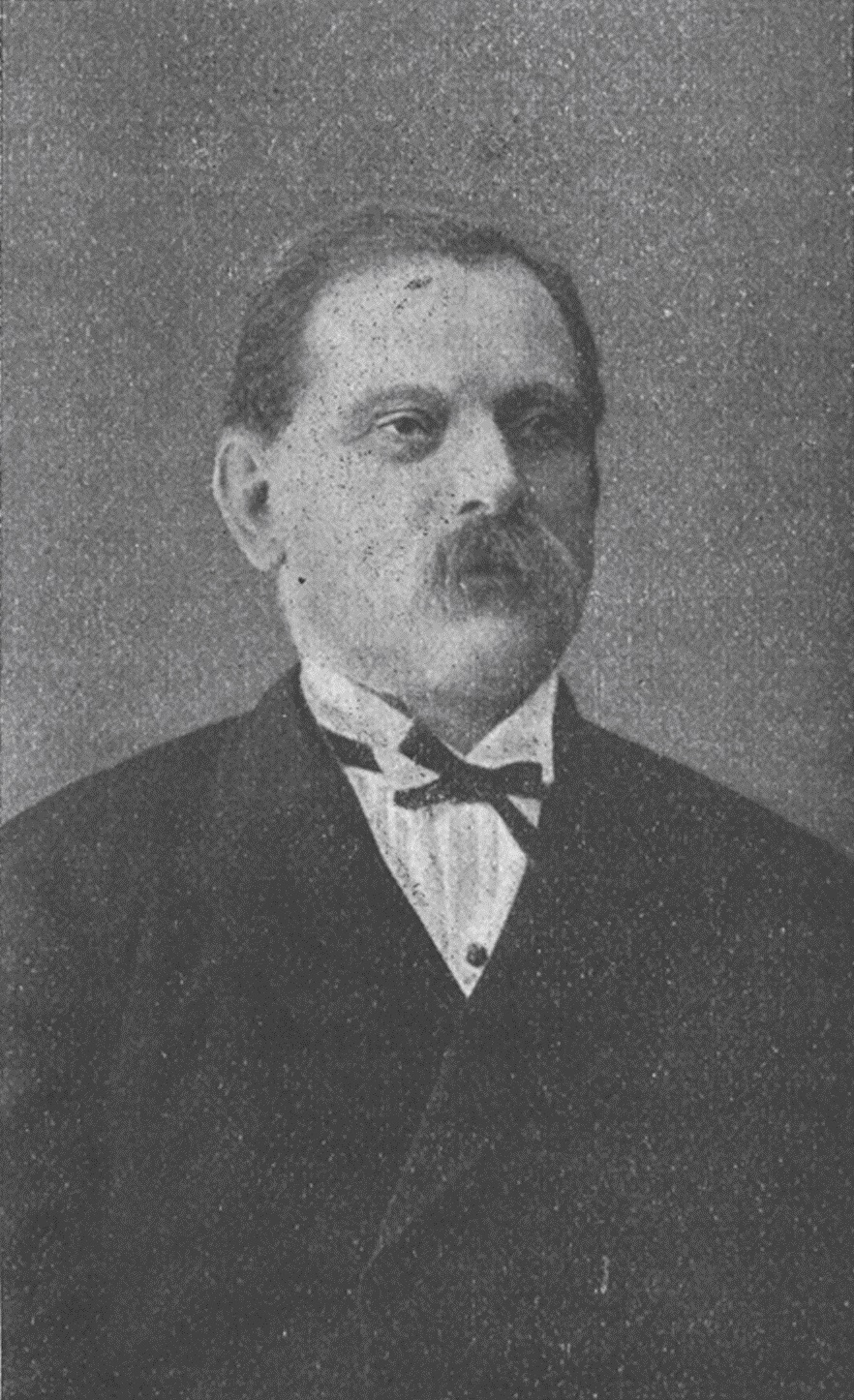
Mayor Ignác Přerovský

The first attempt to establish a lower school arose at the instigation of the mayor of the town Martin Hassek from Třebíčské zastitutelstva in 1853 and led to the submission of an application to the government to establish a school with the offer that the city would provide a building for the school and also all necessary equipment. Proving the seriousness of the request, the city bought house number standing on Jordán, today in Masaryk Square. A new school building was to be built in its place.

However, there were delays in the consideration of the proposal by the official authorities. In the meantime, the distribution of forces in the Třebíč council changed, and conservative members stood up for Hassk's efforts and revoked previously given promises to secure the school. Further pressure led to the resignation of Martin Hassk from the position of mayor in 1857.

It was not until 1867 that the government of Karel Fundulus the Elder fell and the new mayor Ignác Přerovský revived the idea of establishing a secondary school. This time, however, the representatives did not strive for a lower real school, but for a lower gymnasium. In 1870, a delegation consisting of Ignác Přerovský, Alois Hassek and František Müller personally went to Vienna to discuss its establishment. Further discussion of the request was undertaken in Vienna by the then Council of Ministers Josef Jireček, who also became Minister of Culture and Education in the Hohenwart government a year later. From this position, he ensured the imperial decision of 14 August 1871 on the establishment of c. k. Slavic lower gymnasiums in Třebíč and Valašská Meziříčí. The Slavic gymnasium founded in Moravia was identical to the Czech gymnasium in Bohemia. Alois Vaníček was appointed as the first director of the grammar school, and František Hejzlar was appointed as professor. To ensure the running of the school, the city rented rooms in the house "U Krupičků".

== Reconstruction and present day ==
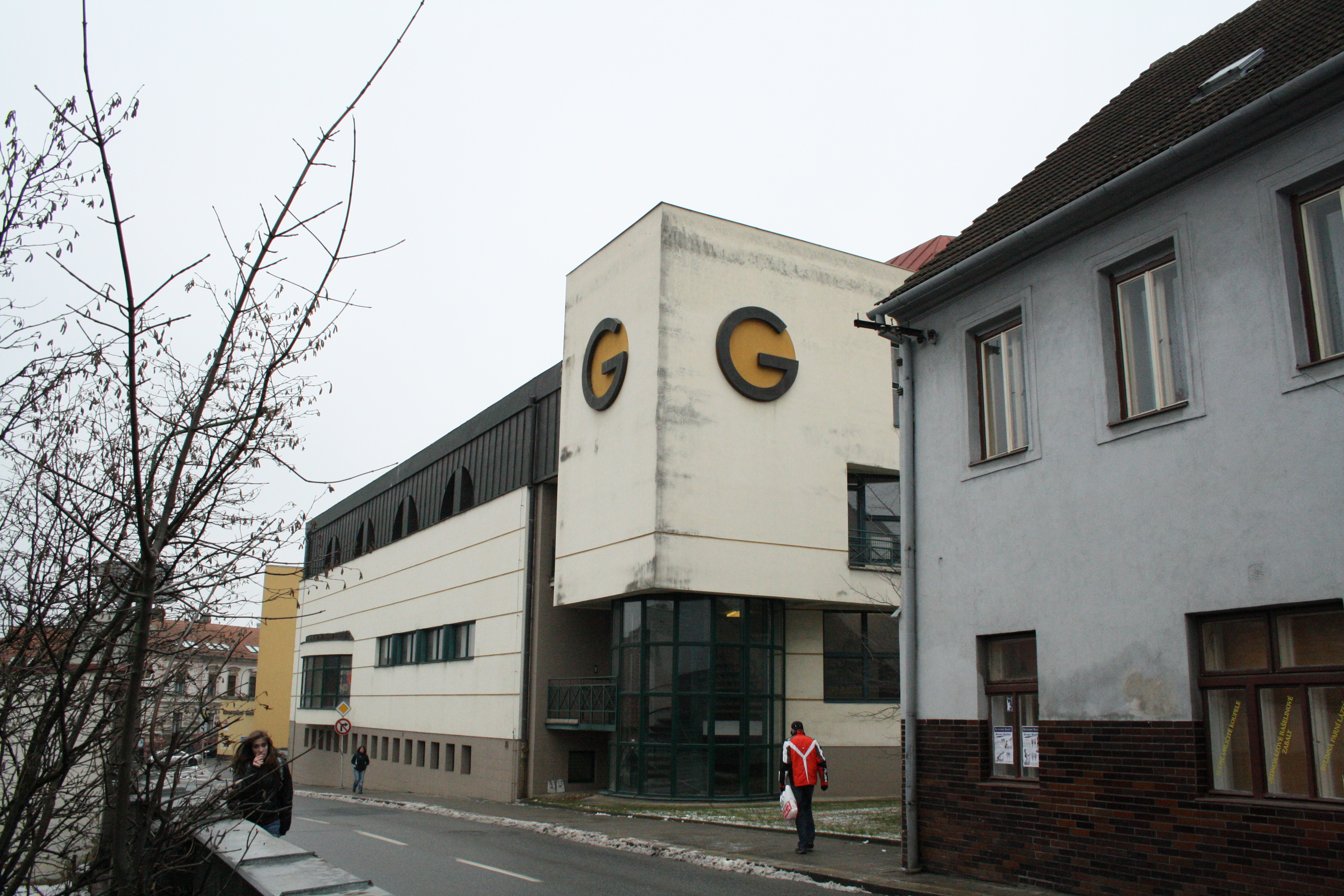
New gymnasium building

The gymnasium is one of the main secondary schools in Třebíč. 46 teachers and about six hundred students are now there. They teach languages (French, English, German, Russian and earlier Latin) and natural sciences. This gymnasium is divided to The New building and The Old building. Both halves are joined. The Old building built in 1871. After eighteen years, in 1889, Třebíč built The New building and in year 1994 was expanded. There are twenty classes: 1.-8.G, 1.-4. A, B, C.
