= Borovina =

- Coordinates: 49°12′24″N 15°50′51″E
- Country: Czech Republic
- Region: Vysočina
- District: Třebíč
- City: Třebíč

Area
  - Total: 1.8 km^{2} (0.69 sq mi)

Population (2021)
  - Total: 4,735
  - Density: 2,600/km^{2} (6,800/sq mi)

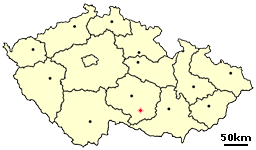
Location in Czech Republic

Town district layout

Borovina is one of the town districts of Třebíč in the Czech Republic and it has a so-called new part and old part. In old part there are mainly family houses, then in younger part of Borovina there are many panel blocks of flats and it is near the market town of Stařeč and it was built in the seventies of twentieth century.

The new part is situated in Valley of the Stařečský potok (Stařeč brook) and also there is situated Borovinský rybník (Pond of Borovina)

A lot of staff working for Dukovany Nuclear Power Station live in Borovina district.

== History ==
Borovina is one of the newer parts of Třebíč, it originated in 19th and 20th century. Borovina is often being divided into the old and the new part. The old part was built in 19th century and it is situated closer to the center of Třebíč. This older part was developed mainly as a residential district for the workers of Bata Shoes shoe factory, which later transformed into a state owned factory called BOPO in the communist era.

The new part is the most western part of Třebíč and it was built in second half of 20th century as a residential area for the workers of Dukovany Nuclear Power Station and their families.

== Demographics ==
Historical population
Year	Pop.	±%
1980	3,978	—
1991	5,838	+46.8%
2001	5,864	+0.4%
2011	5,003	−14.7%
2021	4,735	−5.4%
Source: Censuses

== Transport ==
This town district has a train station called Třebíč Borovina, served by local trains on the Třebíč-Jihlava line.

== Photogallery ==
=== New Borovina ===
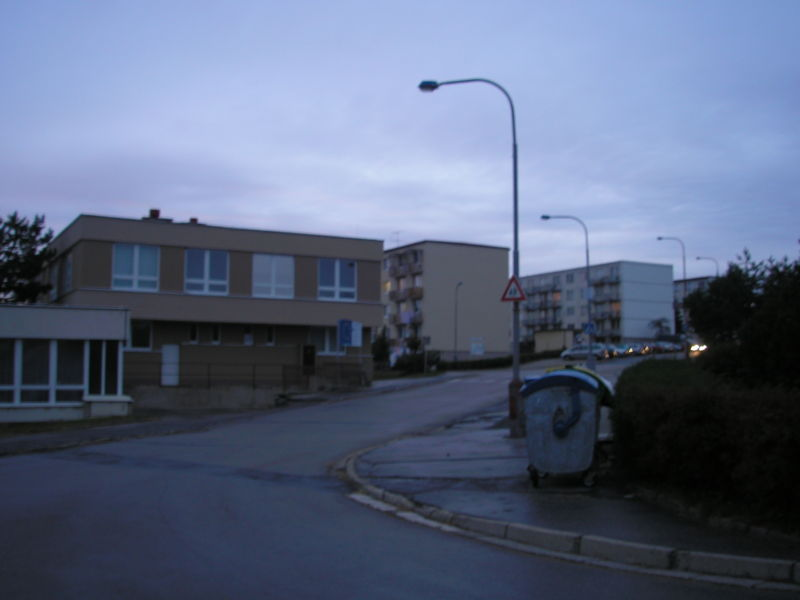
South view of development

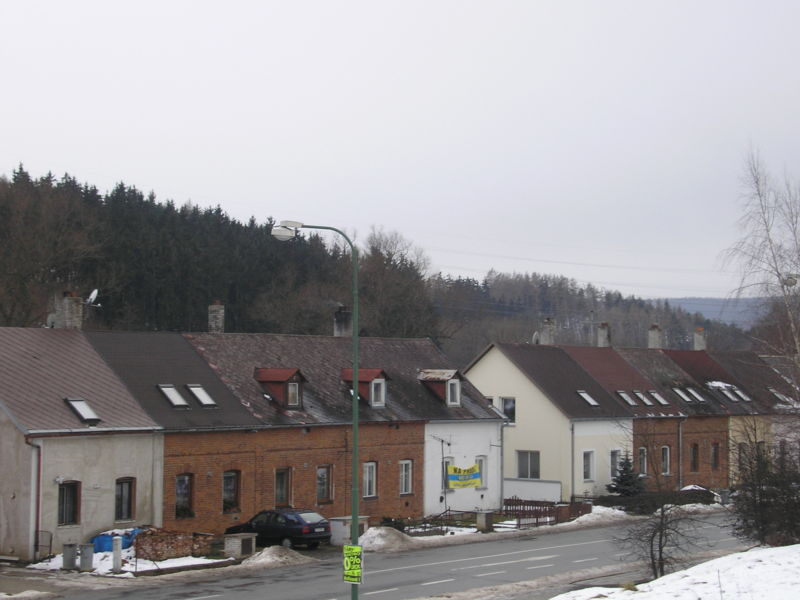
Old houses in New Borovina

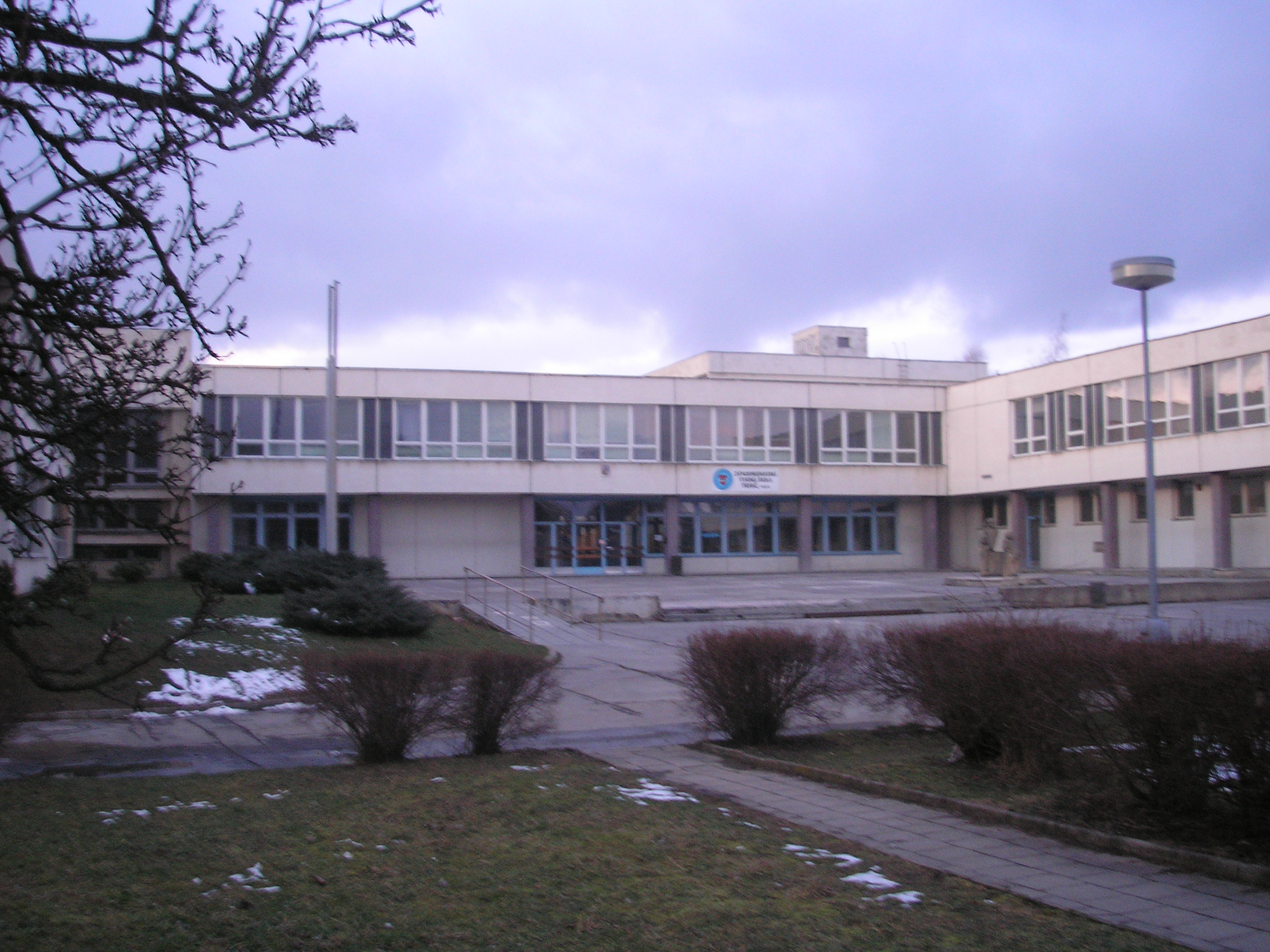
ZMVŠ

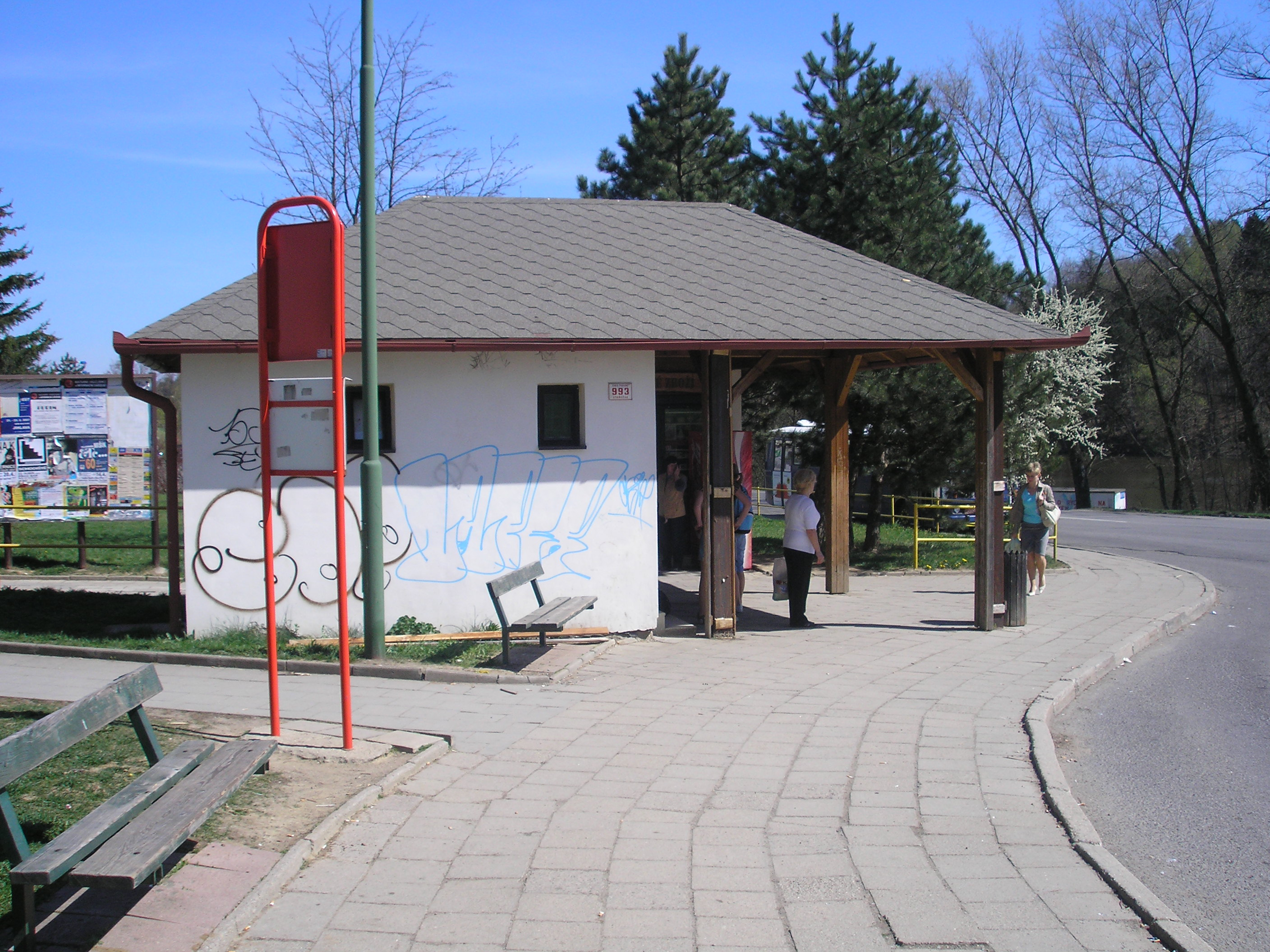
Bus stop in New Borovina

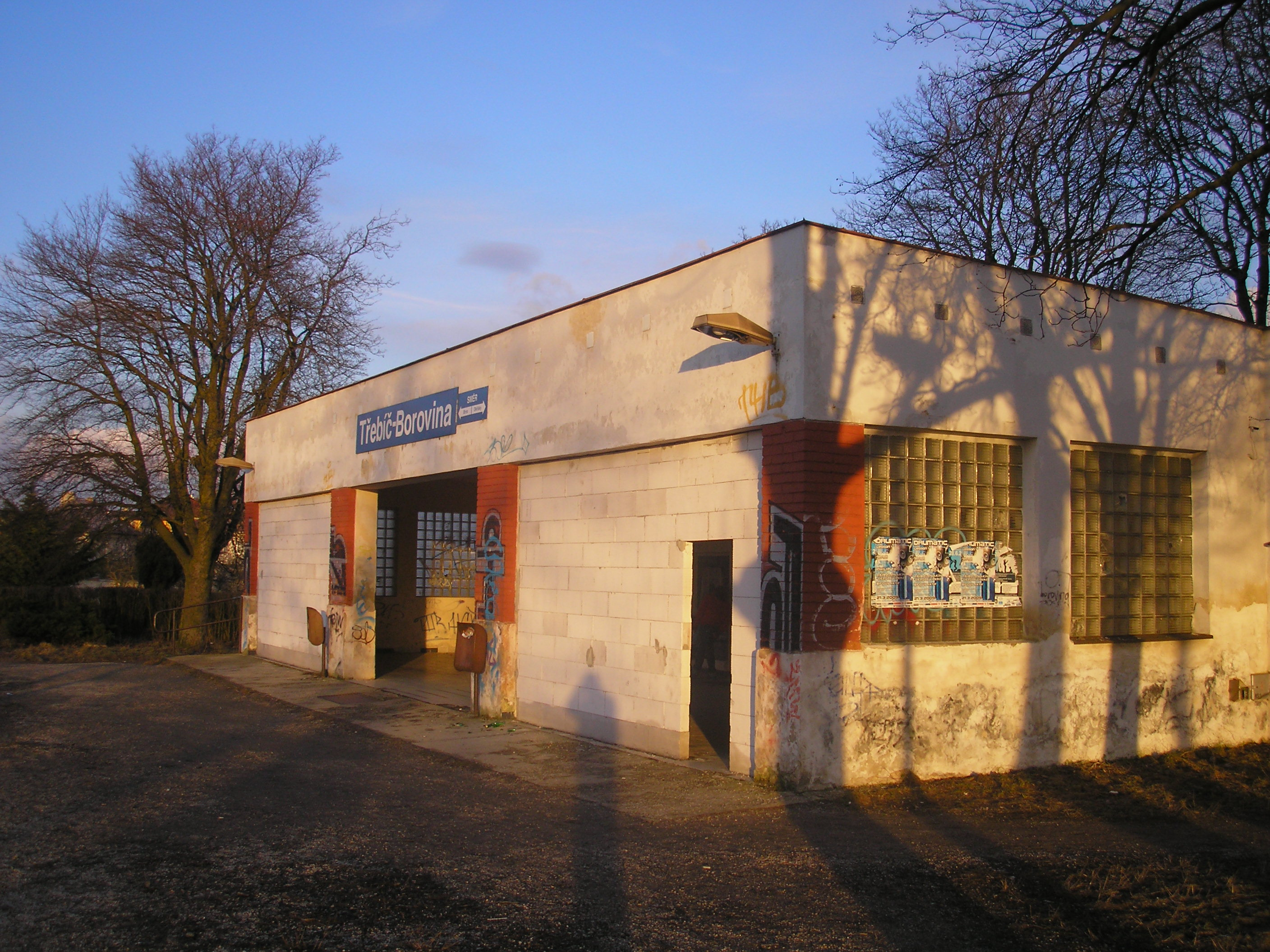
Train halt
