= Trnava (Třebíč District) =

- Municipality
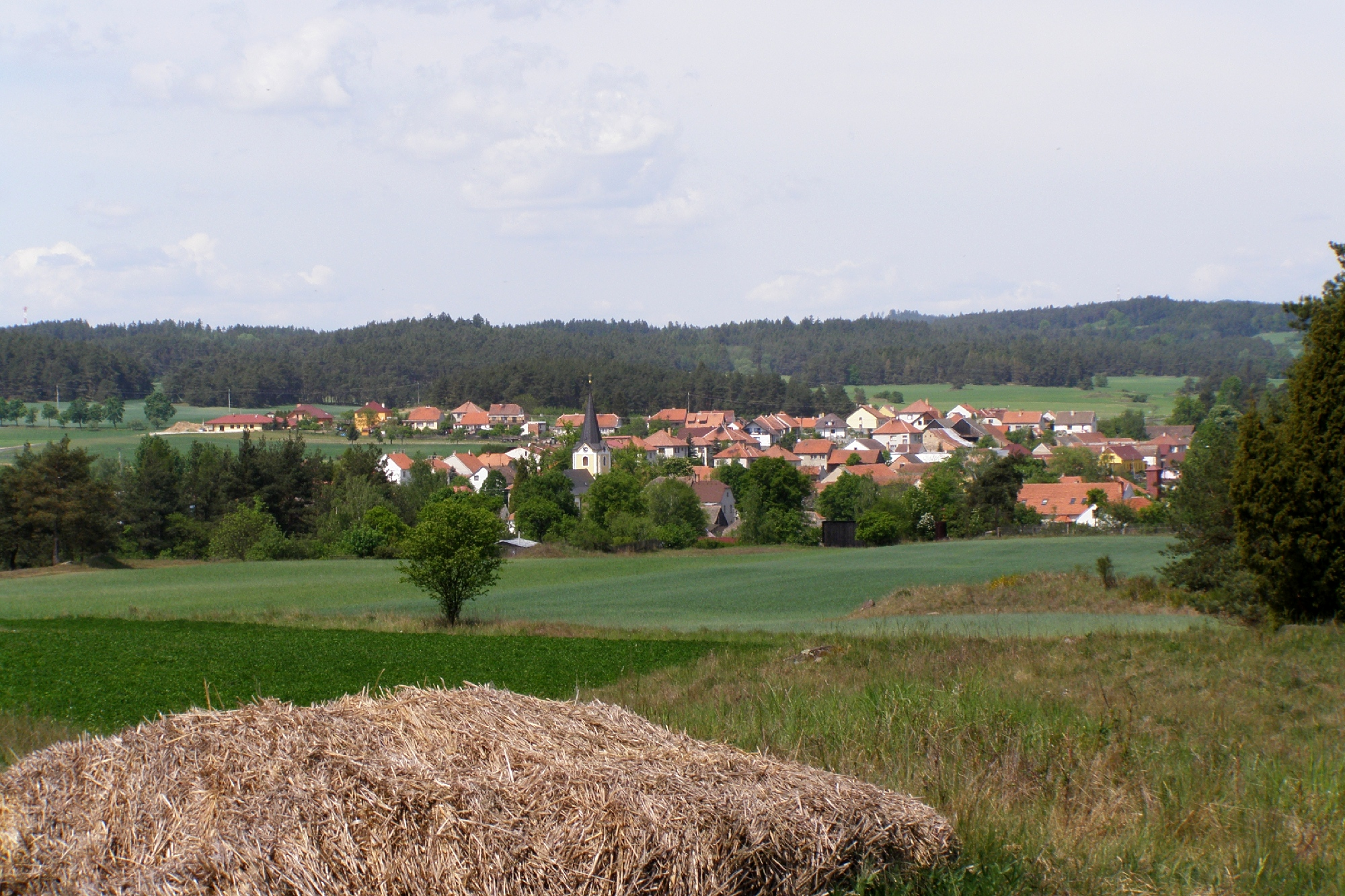
- General view

- Flag Coat of arms

- Location in the Czech Republic
- Coordinates: 49°15′17″N 15°55′27″E
- Country: Czech Republic
- Region: Vysočina
- District: Třebíč
- First mentioned: 1101

Area
  - Total: 12.39 km^{2} (4.78 sq mi)
- Elevation: 428 m (1,404 ft)

Population (2026-01-01)
  - Total: 785
  - Density: 63.4/km^{2} (164/sq mi)
- Time zone: UTC+1 (CET)
  - Summer (DST): UTC+2 (CEST)
- Postal code: 674 01
- Website: www.obectrnava.cz

Trnava is a municipality and village in Třebíč District in the Vysočina Region of the Czech Republic. It has about 800 inhabitants.

Trnava lies approximately 6 kilometres (4 mi) north-east of Třebíč, 29 km (18 mi) south-east of Jihlava, and 143 km (89 mi) south-east of Prague.

== Demographics ==
Historical population
| Year | Pop. | ±% |
|---|---|---|
| 1869 | 465 | — |
| 1880 | 519 | +11.6% |
| 1890 | 531 | +2.3% |
| 1900 | 595 | +12.1% |
| 1910 | 665 | +11.8% |
| 1921 | 655 | −1.5% |
| 1930 | 720 | +9.9% |
| 1950 | 589 | −18.2% |
| 1961 | 698 | +18.5% |
| 1970 | 678 | −2.9% |
| 1980 | 661 | −2.5% |
| 1991 | 598 | −9.5% |
| 2001 | 577 | −3.5% |
| 2011 | 589 | +2.1% |
| 2021 | 702 | +19.2% |
Source: Censuses
