= Horka Domky =

Horka-Domky
- Municipal part of Třebíč
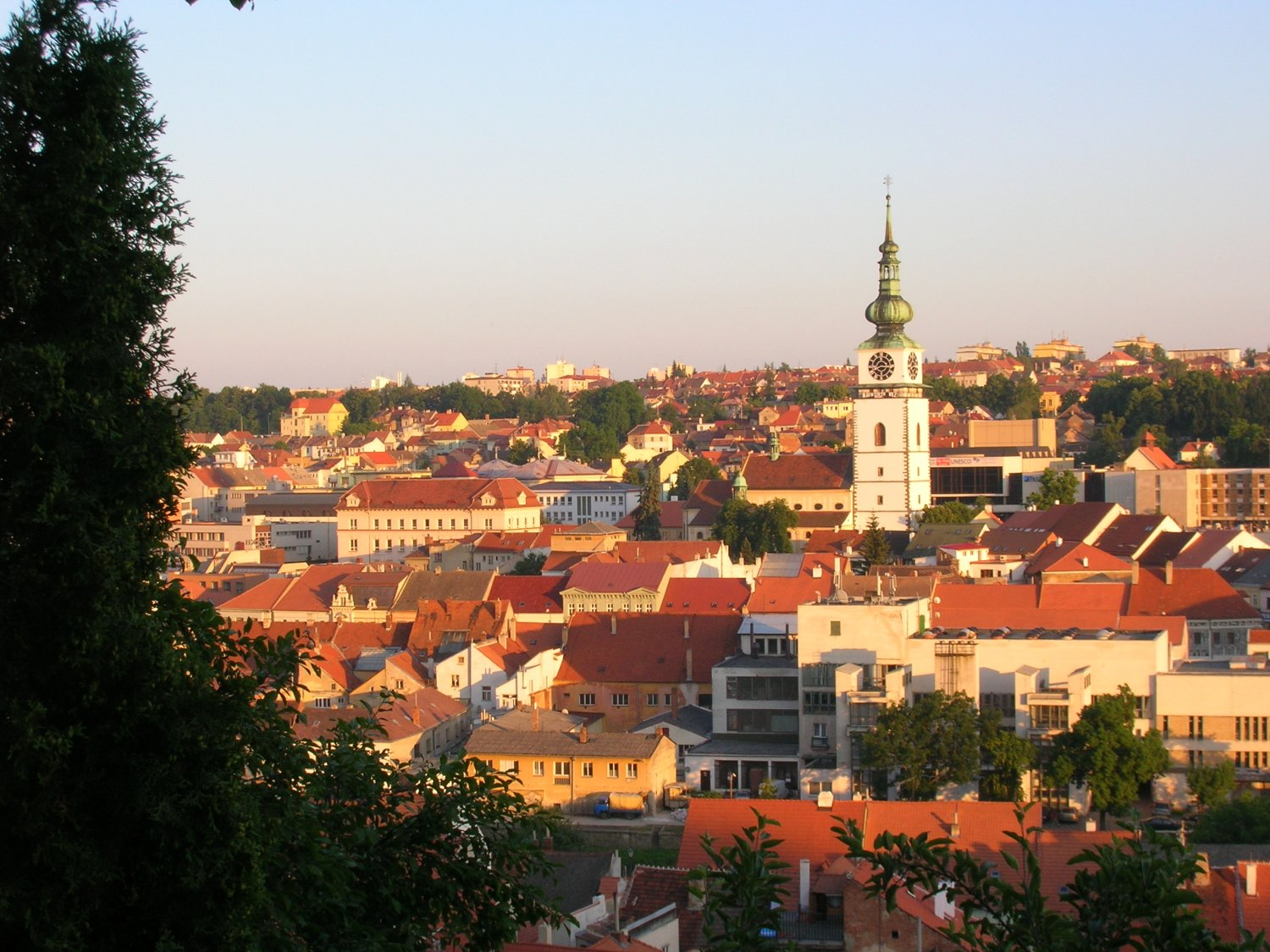

- Coordinates: Location of Horka-Domky in Třebíč 49°12′31″N 15°52′59″E
- Country: Czech Republic
- Region: Vysočina
- District: Třebíč
- Municipality: Třebíč

Area
  - Total: 2.74 km^{2} (1.06 sq mi)

Population (2021)
  - Total: 7,205
  - Density: 2,630/km^{2} (6,810/sq mi)
- Time zone: UTC+1 (CET)
  - Summer (DST): UTC+2 (CEST)
- Postal code: 674 01

Horka-Domky is a municipal part of the town of Třebíč in Třebíč District in the Vysočina Region of the Czech Republic. There are apartment blocks and family houses there. The TEDOM company is based in this town.

== Demographics ==
Historical population

Year	Pop.	±%
1869	1,119	—
1880	1,220	+9.0%
1890	1,522	+24.8%
1900	2,058	+35.2%
1910	2,715	+31.9%
1921	3,136	+15.5%

Year	Pop.	±%
1930	4,392	+40.1%
1980	9,929	+126.1%
1991	8,123	−18.2%
2001	7,788	−4.1%
2011	7,636	−2.0%
2021	7,205	−5.6%

Source: Censuses
