= Třebíč =

Town in Vysočina Region, Czech Republic

- Town
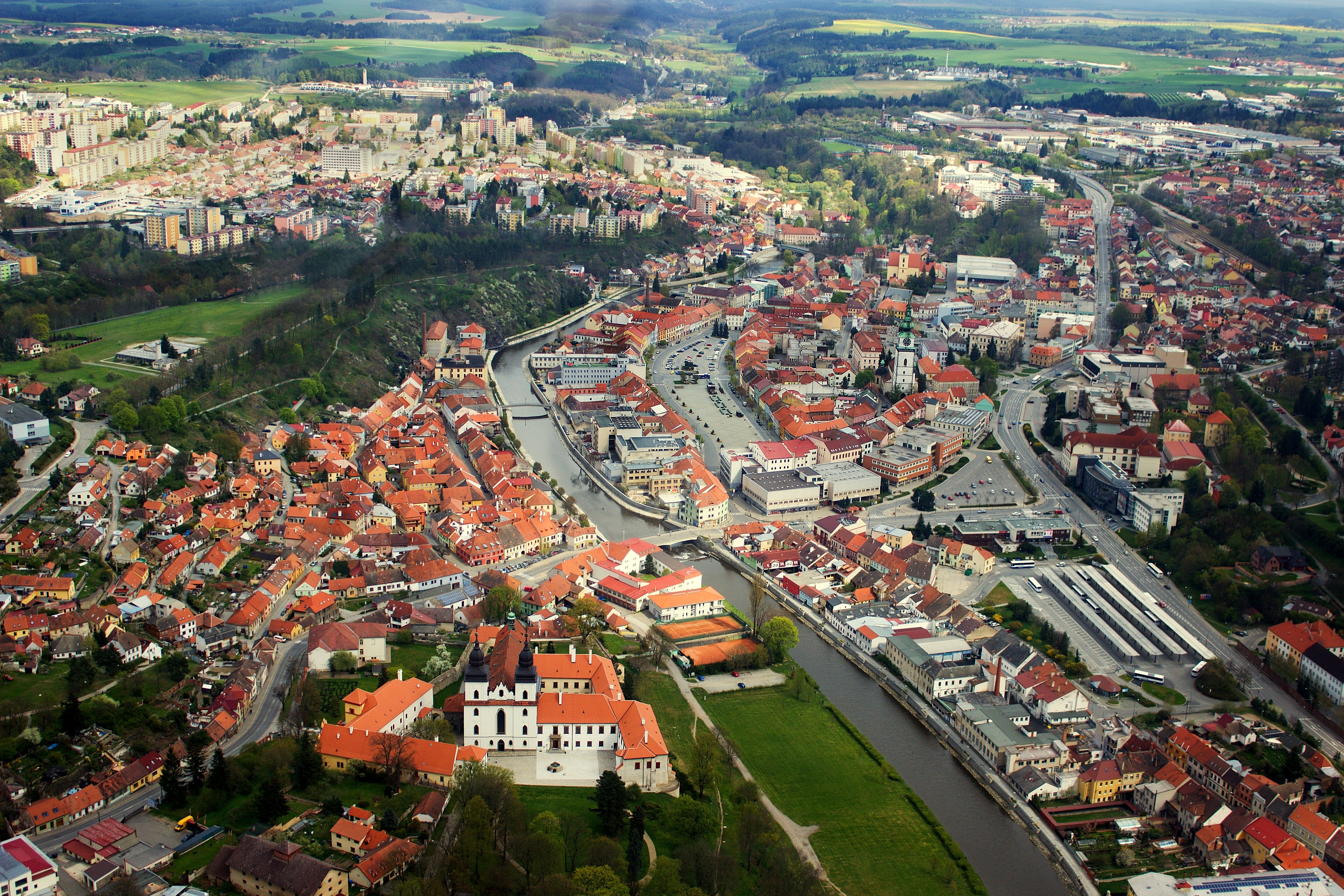
- Aerial view of the centre of Třebíč

- Flag Coat of arms

- Location in the Czech Republic
- Coordinates: 49°12′54″N 15°52′54″E
- Country: Czech Republic
- Region: Vysočina
- District: Třebíč
- First mentioned: 1277

Government
  - Mayor: Pavel Pacal (STAN)

Area
  - Total: 57.59 km^{2} (22.24 sq mi)
- Elevation: 405 m (1,329 ft)

Population (2026-01-01)
  - Total: 34,476
  - Density: 598.6/km^{2} (1,550/sq mi)
- Time zone: UTC+1 (CET)
  - Summer (DST): UTC+2 (CEST)
- Postal code: 674 01
- Website: www.trebic.cz

UNESCO World Heritage Site
- Official name: Jewish Quarter and St. Procopius Basilica in Třebíč
- Criteria: ii, iii
- Reference: 1078
- Inscription: 2003 (27th Session)

Třebíč (Czech pronunciation: [ˈtr̝̊ɛbiːtʃ]; German: Trebitsch) is a town in the Vysočina Region of the Czech Republic. It has about 34,000 inhabitants. It is located on the Jihlava River.

The beginnings of the town's history are connected with the establishment of a Benedictine monastery, where the castle is located today. In the age of its expansion, Třebíč was the third most important town in Moravia. The population growth started after World War II.

There are several well-known tourist sights in the town. The Jewish Quarter and the St. Procopius Basilica are listed together as a UNESCO World Heritage Site. The historic town centre is well preserved and is protected as an urban monument zone.

== Administrative division ==
Municipal parts of Třebíč

Třebíč consists of 17 municipal parts (in brackets population according to the 2021 census):

- Borovina (4,735)
- Budíkovice (245)
- Horka Domky (7,205)
- Jejkov (355)
- Nové Dvory (12,453)
- Nové Město (1,593)
- Pocoucov (181)
- Podklášteří (3,298)
- Ptáčov (208)
- Račerovice (154)
- Řípov (69)
- Slavice (272)
- Sokolí (109)
- Stařečka (531)
- Týn (1,925)
- Vnitřní Město (708)
- Zámostí (327)

== Etymology ==
According to the most probable theory, there was a forest called Třebečský les and the town was named after the forest. The name of the forest appeared in Chronica Boemorum and was derived either from the personal name Třebek or from the old Czech word třeby (term for a place of sacrifice to pagan gods). Another theory says that Třebíč has its name from the old Czech verb třebiti, denoting the clearing of land after burning vegetation.

== Geography ==
Třebíč is located about 29 kilometres (18 mi) southeast of Jihlava and 52 km (32 mi) west of Brno. It lies in the Jevišovice Uplands. The highest point is at 579 m (1,900 ft) above sea level. The Jihlava River flows through the town.

The municipal territory is rich in water bodies, including many fishponds and Lubí Reservoir. The northeastern part of the municipal territory is protected as the Třebíčsko Nature Park.

== History ==
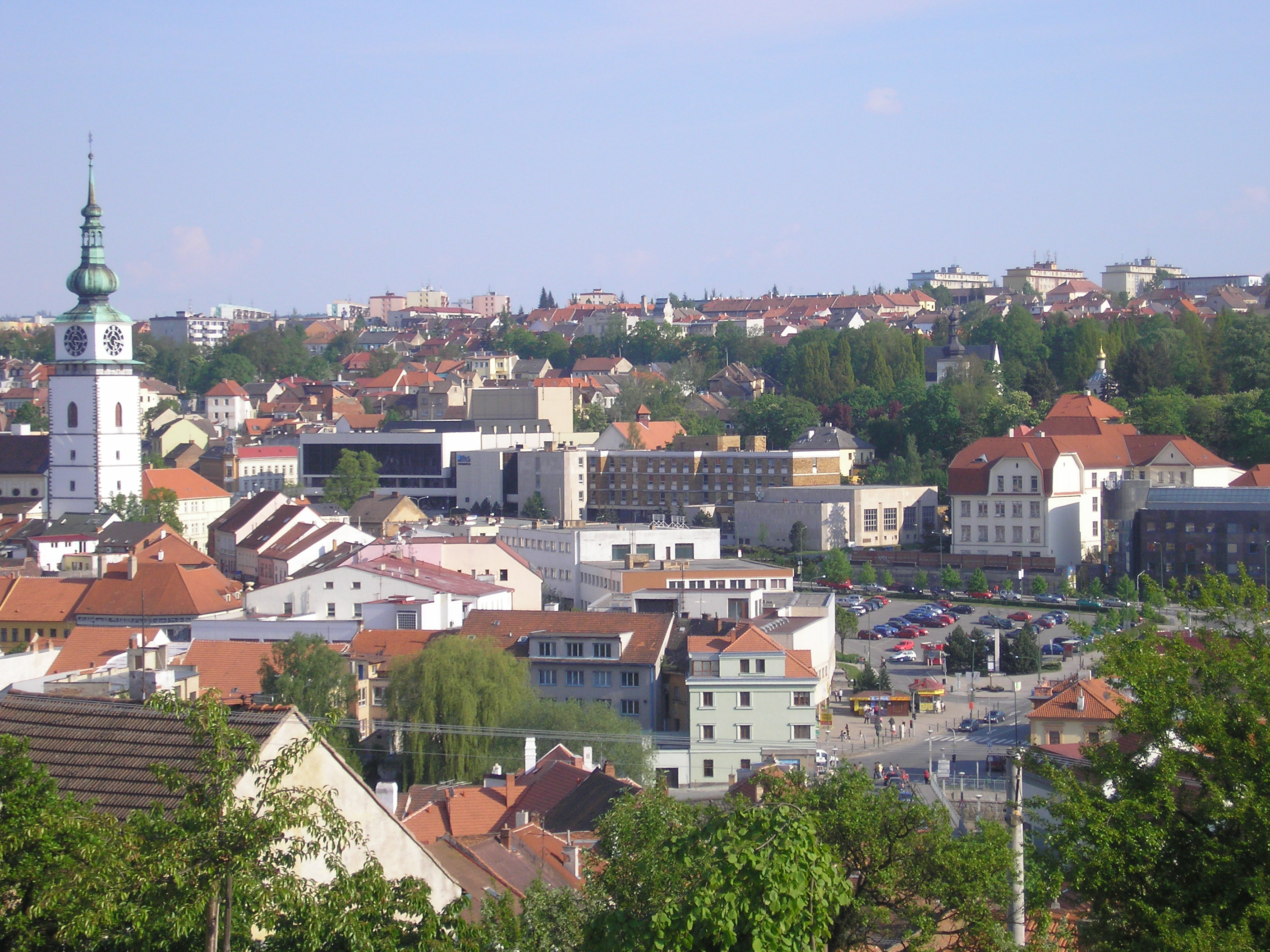
The square Komenského náměstí and the municipal tower

The first written mention of Třebíč is from 1101, when a Benedictine monastery was established here. In 1277, Třebíč was first referred to as a town. In 1335, Třebíč obtained town rights at the level of the rights of royal towns. Třebíč had the right to build town fortifications and ceased to be subject unconditionally to the monastery. The Jewish population was first documented in 1338.

During the Hussite Wars, Třebíč was conquered by the Hussites and became their military base. After the wars, the town was returned to the possession of the monastery. In 1468, Třebíč was conquered and destroyed by Matthias Corvinus, including the monastery. After the Bohemian–Hungarian War (1468–1478), Třebíč was acquired by Zdeněk of Sternberg. During the rule of the Pernštejn family between 1490 and 1556, the town recovered and stabilized economically.

Třebíč was not too affected by the Thirty Years' War. After the war, the town was re-Catholicized. In the 17th an 18th centuries, Třebíč was mostly owned by the Waldstein family. In 1786, the Germanisation began. In 1821 and 1822, large fires severely damaged the town.

In the late 19th century, Třebíč was industrialised. There has been mainly development of tannery and shoemaking. The development of industry was accelerated by the opening of the railway in 1886. In the 1930s, the shoe factory was bought by Bata Corporation and workers' colonies were constructed in Borovina.

In the 1970s and 1980s, several historic buildings were demolished and new housing estates were constructed, which resulted in population growth.

== Demographics ==
Historical population

Year	Pop.	±%
1869	10,328	—
1880	11,999	+16.2%
1890	13,726	+14.4%
1900	15,309	+11.5%
1910	16,347	+6.8%

Year	Pop.	±%
1921	17,191	+5.2%
1930	17,555	+2.1%
1950	20,257	+15.4%
1961	20,387	+0.6%
1970	22,555	+10.6%

Year	Pop.	±%
1980	29,017	+28.6%
1991	38,355	+32.2%
2001	39,021	+1.7%
2011	36,998	−5.2%
2021	34,368	−7.1%

Source: Censuses

== Economy ==
There are no major industrial companies. The largest employers based in Třebíč are the Třebíč Hospital, and energy sector companies I&C Energo and ČEZ Energoservis.

== Transport ==
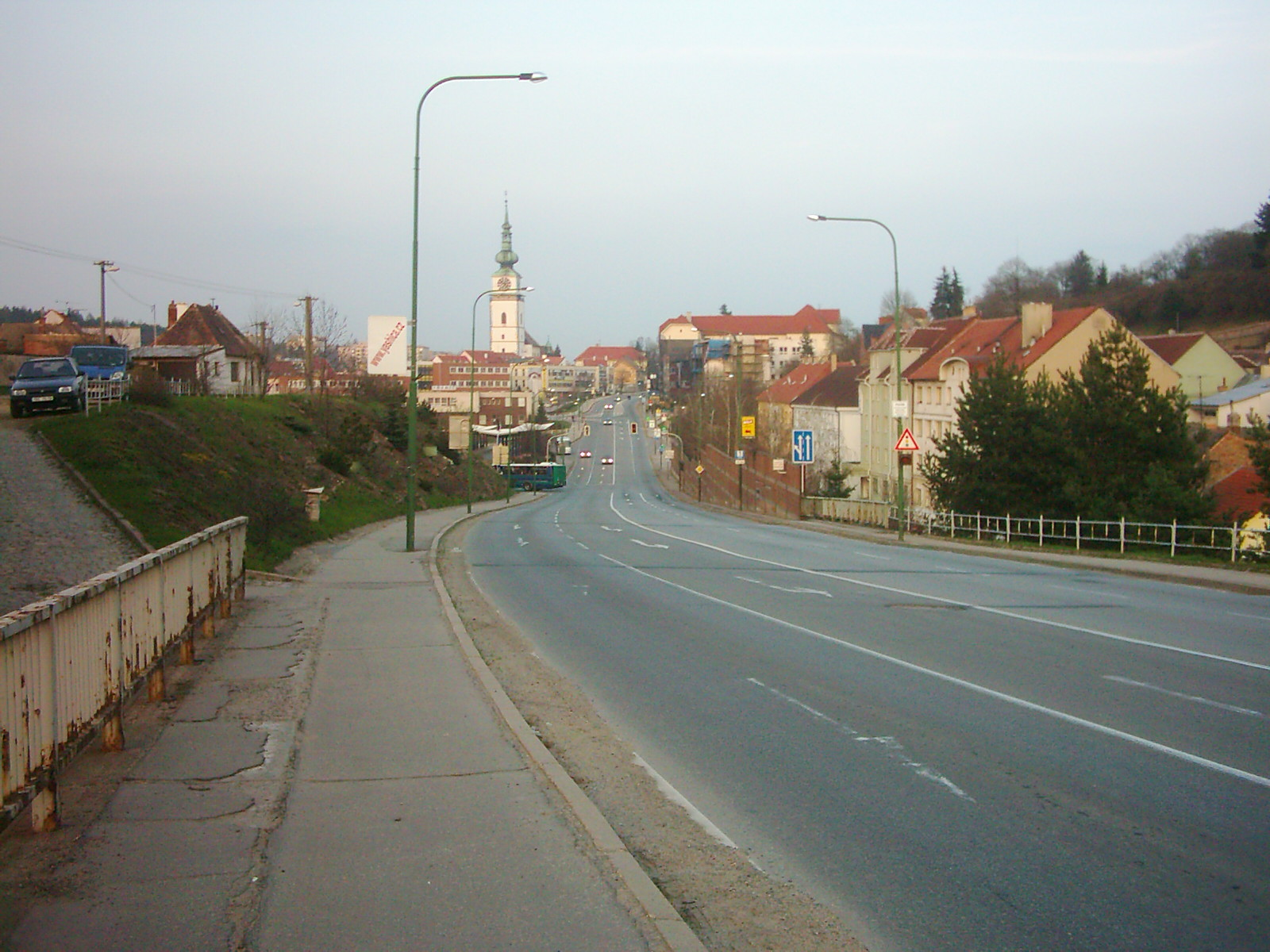
The I/23 road in Třebíč

The I/23 road, which leads from Veselí nad Lužnicí to Rosice, passes through Třebíč. The II/360 connects Třebíč with the D1 motorway in Velké Meziříčí. The II/405 road, separating from the I/23, connects Třebíč with Jihlava.

Třebíč lies on an important interregional railway line heading from Brno to Plzeň via Třebíč, Jihlava and České Budějovice. There are two train stations serving the town: Třebíč and Třebíč-Borovina.

Intra-town transport is provided by buses.

A small sport airport named Třebíč is located outside of the municipal territory, in neighbouring Kožichovice.

== Culture ==
Festivals held in Třebíš include:

- Theatre Třebíč (Divadelní Třebíč) – festival of amateur theatre
- Šamajim – festival of Jewish culture
- Třebíč potato festival (Bramborobraní) – folklore festival – music and dance
- UNESCO Jubilee – jubilee celebration of town entrance to the UNESCO list
- Theatre 2-3-4 actors (Divadla 2-3-4 herců) – festival of professional theatre
- Zámostí – cultural and music festival
- Concentus Moraviae – concerts of classical music

== Education ==
In Třebíč there is one private university, Westmoravian College Třebíč. Secondary schools include:

- Gymnasium Třebíč
- Catholic Gymnasium Třebíč
- Secondary Industrial School Třebíč
- Secondary School of Civil Engineering Třebíč
- Higher Vocational School and Secondary School of Veterinary, Agricultural and Medical Třebíč
- Dr. Albín Bráf Business Academy
- Academy of Law, Pedagogy and Entrepreneurship, Secondary School Třebíč

== Sights ==
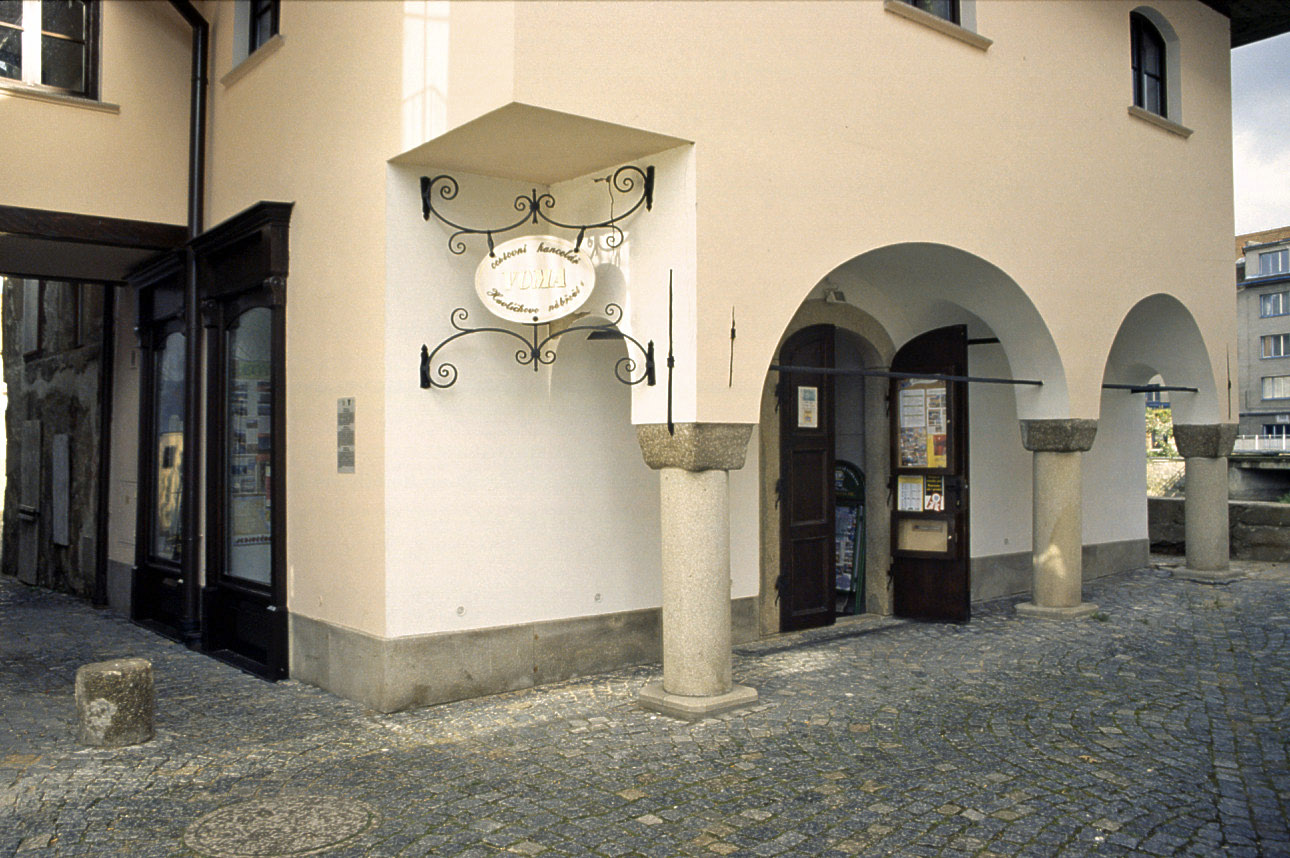
The entrance of the Jewish quarter

Since 2003, the Jewish Quarter and the St. Procopius Basilica have been protected as a UNESCO World Heritage Site because of their testimony to cultural interchange across several centuries and the remarkable architecture within the site.

The basilica incorporates some later Gothic features, including a rare example of a ten-part (also known as "botanical") rose window. Such designs reflect the five or ten parts of the family Rosaceae flowers and fruit, based on their five sepals and petals or the usual ten segments of their fruit. Botanical rose windows contrast with more complex Gothic windows that contain more segments (usually multiples of traditional gothic units of design – three trefoil, or four quatrefoil). Another thesis says that these decorations are based on an ancient design, inspired by forerunners in the wheel of life, associated with eastern religions nowadays, or may allude to the Virgin Mary.

The basilica originated in the early 12th century as a Benedictine monastery. It was endowed so well, that it led to the establishment of a local commercial centre; the town of Třebíč. The monastery was rebuilt during the reign of King Wenceslaus I (1230–1253), and again at the end of the 15th century. During the first half of the 16th century, some of Třebíč's historic monastic buildings were remodeled into a castle and were later renovated in Baroque style. In the early 18th century, changes were introduced on the basilica by the Czech architect František Maxmilián Kaňka; windows were enlarged, buttresses were added, a southwest tower was rebuilt, and a new west front with two towers was constructed in the Gothic-Baroque style.

The historic centre of Třebíč, which extends on both sides of the Jihlava River, was declared an urban monument zone in 1990. The Jewish Quarter and St. Procopius Basilica, together with the castle and gardens, are all included within the urban monument zone.

== Notable people ==
- Johann Philipp Neumann (1774–1849), Austrian physicist and poet
- Adolf Kurrein (1846–1919), Austrian rabbi
- Friedrich Leo von Rottenberger (1872–1938), Austrian landscape architect
- Bohumír Šmeral (1880–1941), politician
- Jan Syrový (1888–1970), general and prime minister (1938)
- Antonín Kalina (1902–1990), war hero
- Jindřich Svoboda (1917–1942), war pilot
- Helena Kružíková (1928–2021), actress
- Míla Myslíková (1933–2005), actress
- Jaroslav Zvěřina (1942–2026), politician and sexologist
- František Bublan (born 1951), politician
- Miroslav Donutil (born 1951), actor
- Oldřich Navrátil (born 1952), actor
- Věra Jourová (born 1964), politician and lawyer
- Pavel Padrnos (born 1970), road racing cyclist
- Jiří Zimola (born 1971), politician
- Olga Šplíchalová (born 1975), swimmer
- Patrik Eliáš (born 1976), ice hockey player
- Martin Erat (born 1981), ice hockey player
- Ondřej Němec (born 1984), ice hockey player
- Theodor Gebre Selassie (born 1986), footballer
- Vladimír Sobotka (born 1987), ice hockey player
- Jitka Boho (born 1991), singer, model and beauty pageant titleholder
- Karel Vejmelka (born 1996), ice hockey player

== Twin towns – sister cities ==
Třebíč is twinned with:

- Humenné, Slovakia
- Lilienfeld, Austria
- Oschatz, Germany
- Rakhiv, Ukraine
- Yichang, China

== Gallery ==
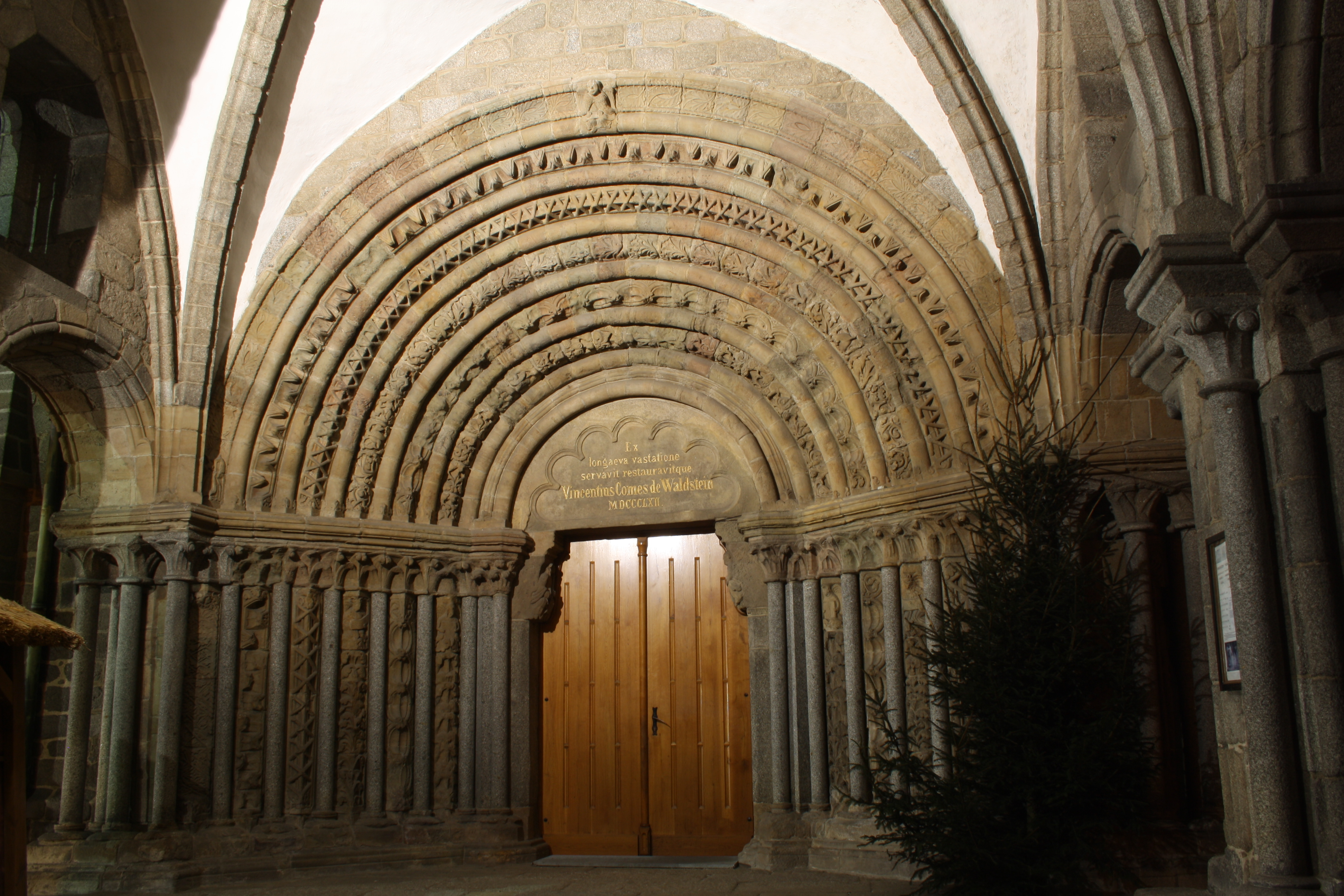
Portal of St. Procopius Basilica

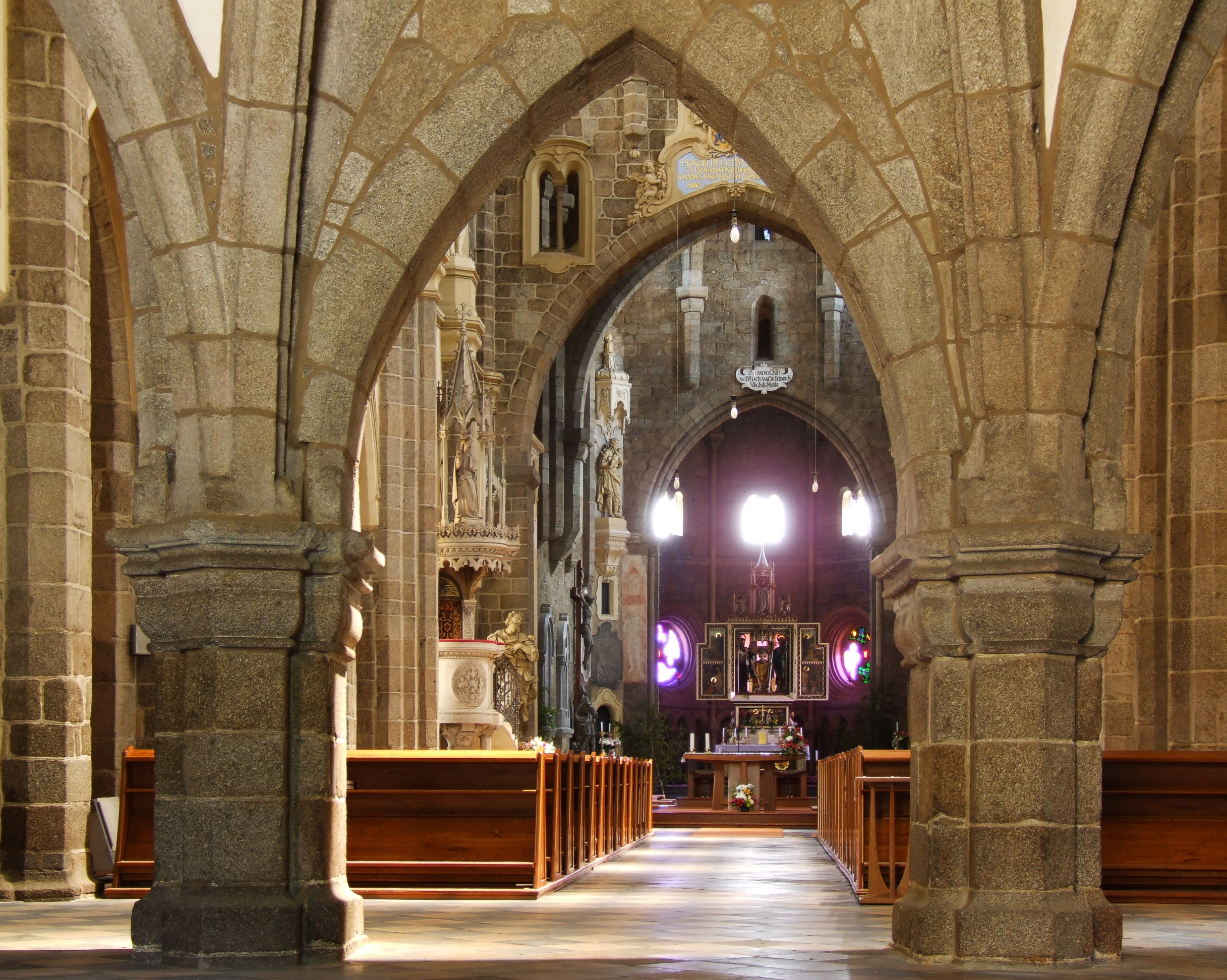
Interior of the St. Procopius Basilica

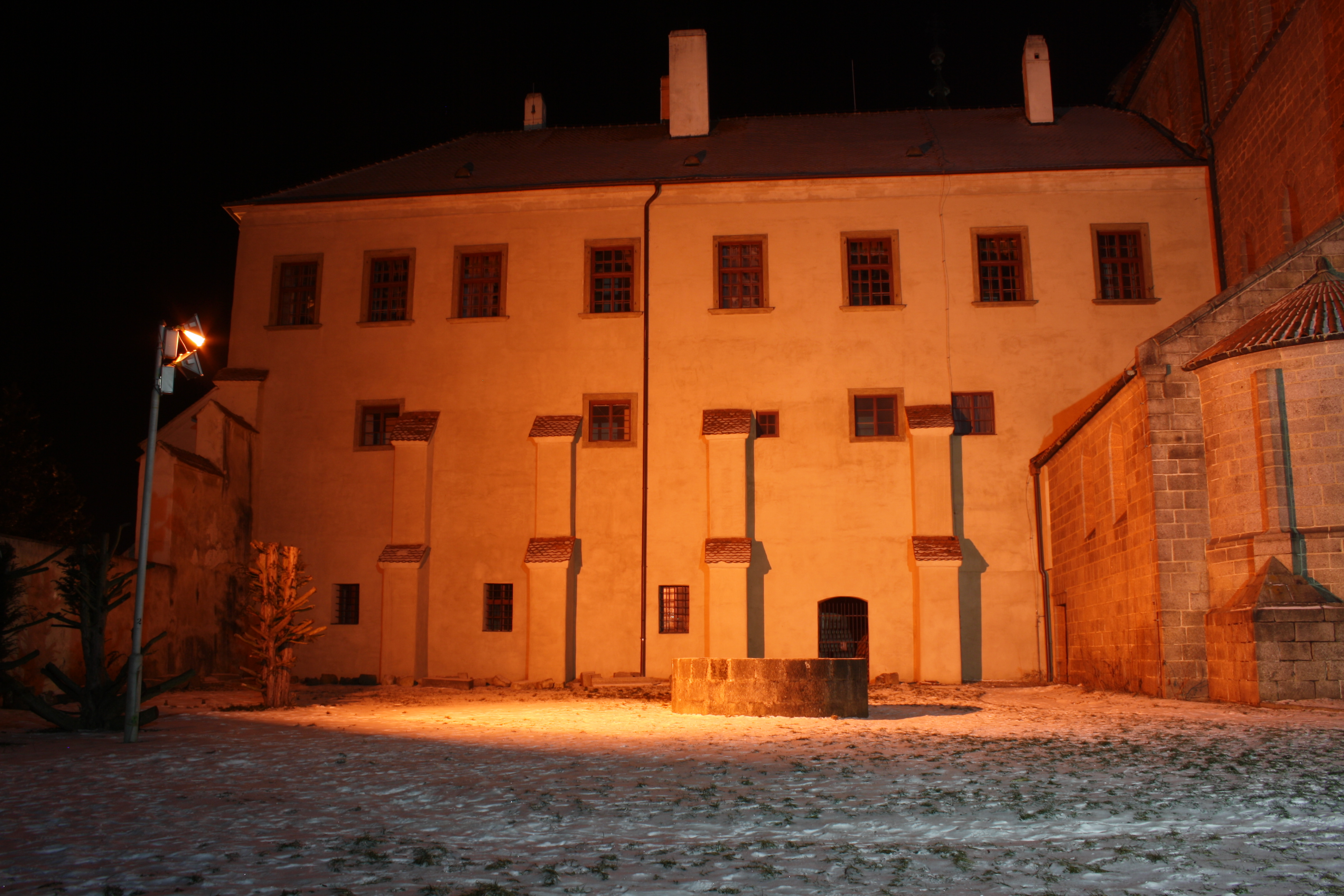
Abbacy of St. Procopius Basilica

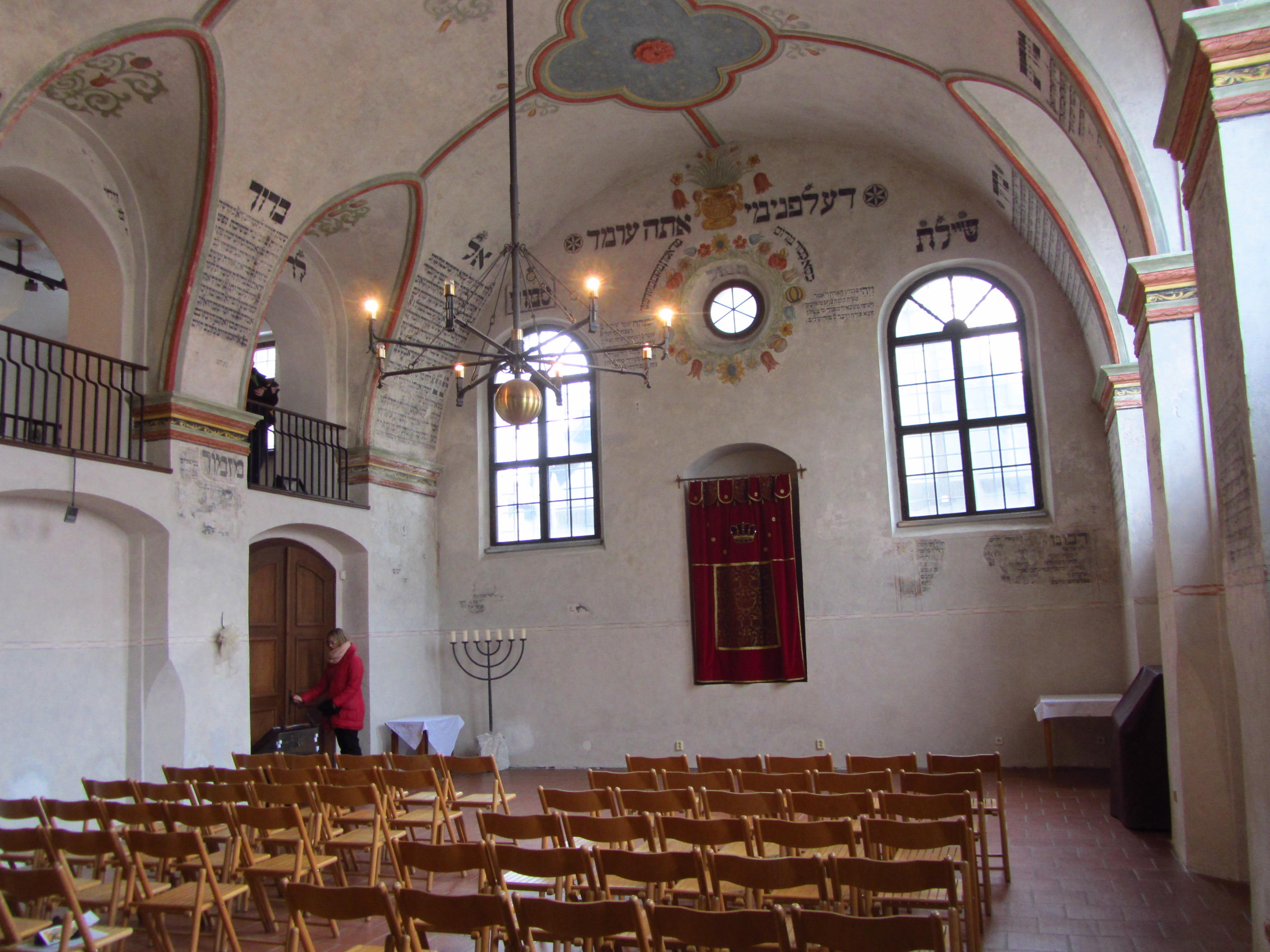
Interior of the Jewish Synagogue

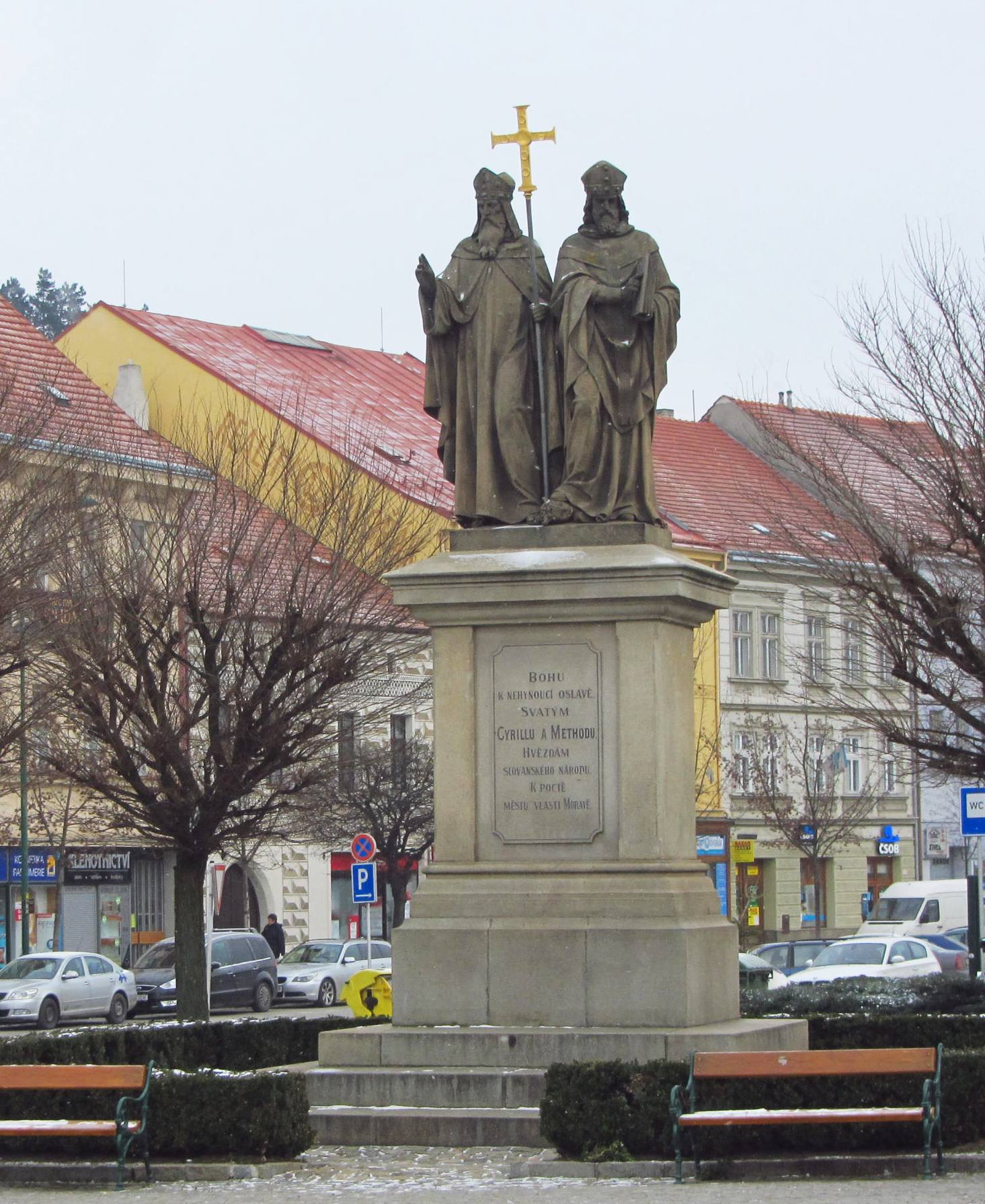
Statue of Saints Cyril and Methodius
