= Yuriy Musatov =

Ukrainian ceramic artist (born 1981)

- Юрій Вікторович Мусатов
- Born: 19 October 1981 (age 44)
- Education: Sumy Dmytro Bortnianskyi Higher College of Culture and Arts, Lviv National Academy of Arts
- Occupation: Сeramiс artist

Yuriy Musatov or Yurii Musatov (Ukrainian: Юрій Вікторович Мусатов; born 19 October 1981) is a Ukrainian ceramic artist. Member of the International Academy of Ceramics, National Union of Artists of Ukraine (2007).

== Biography ==
Yuriy Musatov was born on 19 October 1981, in Konotop, Sumy Oblast.

Until 1995, he studied at the Konotop Children's Art School. In 2001, he graduated from the Sumy Dmytro Bortnianskyi Higher College of Culture and Arts (specialty teachers Sviatoslav Korsun, Hryhorii Protasov), and in 2008, from the Department of Artistic Ceramics of the Faculty of Decorative and Applied Arts of the Lviv National Academy of Arts (specialty teacher Orest Holubets). For some time, he worked in Fuping, China.

He lives and works in Kyiv.

== Creativity ==
From 2004, Musatov has participated in all-Ukrainian and international exhibitions and symposiums. Solo exhibitions have been held in Szydłowiec (2012, Poland), Opishnia (2012), Kyiv (2018), Konotop (2019), Sumy (2022), and Kecskemét (2022, Hungary).

In his works, Musatov uses chamotte, faience, and porcelain masses. In June 2013, at the National Museum-Preserve of Ukrainian Pottery in Opishnia, the ceramist presented Ukraine's tallest five-meter monumental ceramic sculpture "Vezha".

Individual works are preserved in the collections of the Ariana and Avenue de la Paix museums (Geneva, Switzerland), the Ceramics Museum in Ludwigsburg (Germany), the FuLe International Ceramic Art Museum (Fuping, near Xi'an, China), the National Museum of Slovenia, the Mark Rothko Art Centre (Daugavpils, Latvia), Hannelore Seiffert (Germany), Zepter (Milan, Italy), the Municipal Museum of Aveiro (Portugal), the Sumy Porcelain Factory Museum (Sumy, Ukraine), the National Museum of Ukrainian Pottery (Opishnia, Ukraine), the Ukrainian Institute of Modern Art (Chicago, USA), private collections (including Serhii Makhno), and others.

Among important works:

- Compositions: "Chaynyi ekspres" (2008), "Khto ya? Zvidky ya? Kudy ydu?" (3 parts; all 2008), "U poloni chasu" (2011), "Vezhi I i II", "Perysta khmara", "Kill him" (all 2014), "Avtoportret" .
- Series: "Khmara", "Vybuhi" (both 2012–2014), "Galaxy" (planets, craters, flying saucers, aliens), "My planet", "My Mountain", "Keramichni motanky" (2024).

== Awards ==
- Scholarship holder of the Gaude Polonia program of the Ministry of Culture and National Heritage of Poland (2008, 2012);
- First prize of the I International Ceramics Symposium "Art-Wagonette" (2009);
- Grand Prix of the II INTERSymposium of Ceramics in Opishnia (2011);
- First prize of the III INTERSymposium of Ceramics in Opishnia (2012);
- Second prize of the IV National Exhibition-Competition of Artistic Ceramics "KeramPIK" in Opishnia (2012);
- I and II prizes of the V INTERSymposium of Ceramics in Opishnia (2014).

== Bibliography ==
- Musatov Yurii Viktorovych / Ye. O. Moliar // Encyclopedia of Modern Ukraine [Online] / Eds. : I. М. Dziuba, A. I. Zhukovsky, M. H. Zhelezniak [et al.] ; National Academy of Sciences of Ukraine, Shevchenko Scientific Society. – Kyiv : The NASU institute of Encyclopedic Research, 2020.
- Мусатов Юрій Вікторович // Кераміка України = Ceramics of Ukraine / редкол.: М. А. Серб (голова) та ін. — Київ: ВЦ «Логос Україна», 2009. — С. 86—87.
- Шергін С. Сучасний вимір глобалізації: концепції і реальність // Світогляд. — 2008. — № 4. — С. 26–33.
- Неїжмак В. Хмари, що вийшли з печі // Україна молода. — 2013. — 27 лютого. — № 31.
- Неїжмак В. Правічна і завжди модерна глина // Голос України. — 2013. — 22 жовтня.
- Онищенко В. «Вертикаль» Юрія Мусатова // Культура і життя. — 2011. — № 30. — С. 13.
- Островська О. Концептуальна кераміка Юрія Мусатова // Образотворче мистецтво. — 2014. — № 4. — С. 50–51.
- Jim Lawton. 500 Teapots. Volume 2. — Lark Publishing. — 2013.
