= Jindra (given name) =

Jindra is a Czech feminine given name. It is a shortened form of the name Jindřiška, which is a Czech equivalent of the name Henrietta. Jindra also appears as a pet form of the masculine given name Jindřich. Notable people with the name include:

- Jindra Holá (born 1960), Czech ice dancer
- Jindra Košťálová (born 1947), Czech artistic gymnast
- Jindra Kramperová (born 1940), Czech figure skater and pianist
- Jindra Tichá (born 1937), Czech academic and writer
- Jindra Viková (born 1946), Czech sculptor, ceramicist and painter
