= Jindra Viková =

Czech artist (born 1946)

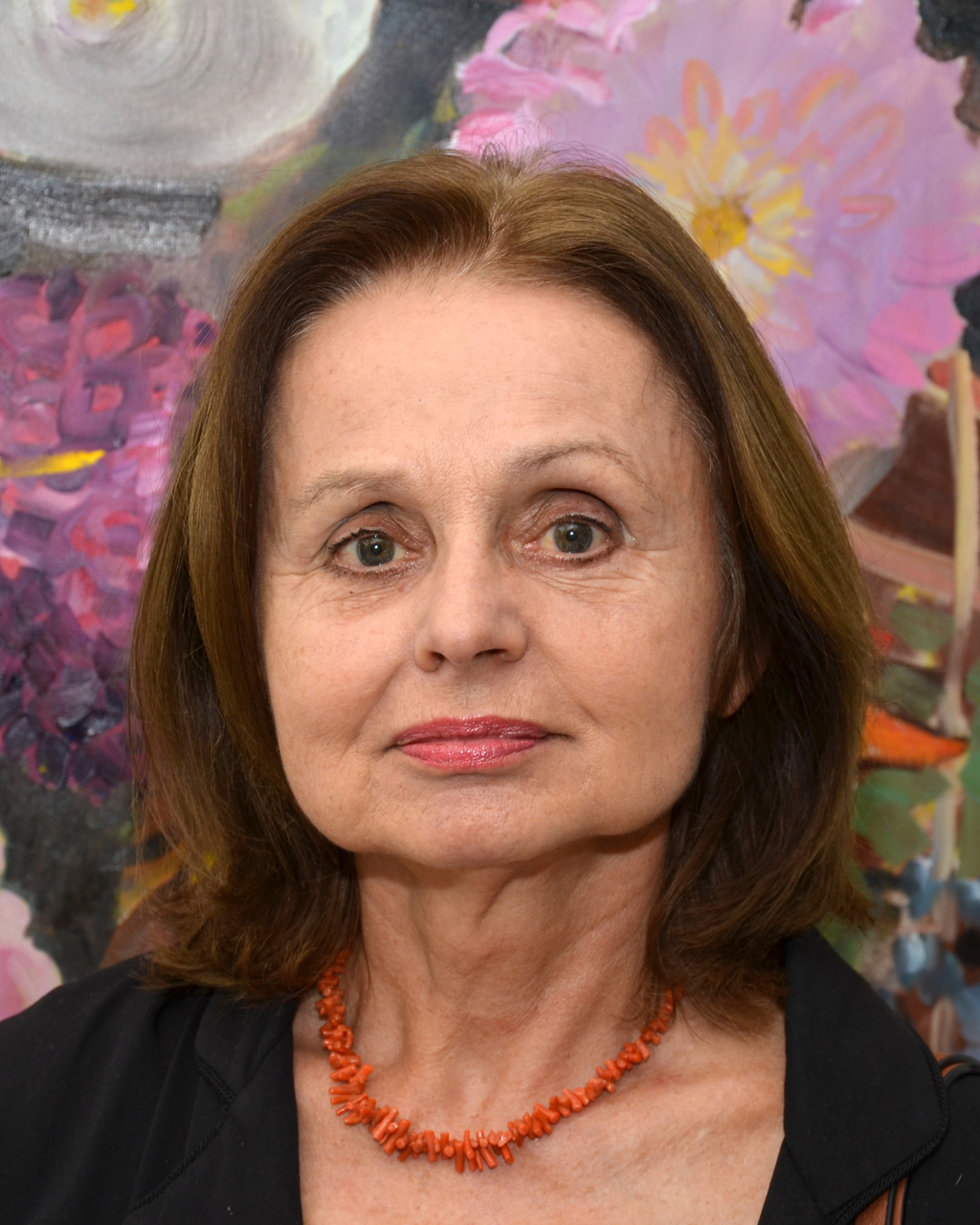
- Viková in 2017
- Born: 2 February 1946 (age 80); Prague, Czechoslovakia
- Education: Academy of Arts, Architecture and Design in Prague
- Known for: sculptor, ceramic artist, painter, graphic artist, curator, college professor
- Spouse: Pavel Baňka
- Children: Markéta Baňková
- Awards: Gold Medal (Faenza 1984, Nyon, Vallauris, 1986, Baghdad, 1988)
- Website: www.jindravikova.cz

Jindra Viková (born 2 February 1946) is a Czech sculptor, ceramicist, painter, curator and lecturer at art schools in the United States and New Zealand, and a member of juries at international competitions. She has received several prestigious awards abroad for her work. Since 1983, she has been a member of the International Academy of Ceramics (IAC) in Geneva, and since 2004 a member of the IAC committee, where she represents Central and Eastern European countries.

== Life ==
Jindra Viková was born on 2 February 1946 in Prague. She comes from a family of bank clerk. Both her parents and her elder sister Jaroslava were artistically gifted – her mother designed her own clothing patterns, her father Jindřich Vik was an amateur painter. His later works are classified as Art brut. Between 1960 and 1964, Viková attended Václav Hollar School of Fine Arts. Since 1964 she studied at the Academy of Arts, Architecture and Design in the ceramics studio under Prof. Otto Eckert. Whilst a student, on 20 August 1968, she married the electrical engineer Pavel Baňka, a member of the beatnik circle around Václav Hrabě and a photographer. They went on their honeymoon to Italy a few days after the Soviet occupation in August 1968. In 1969, their daughter Markéta was born. She completed her studies in 1970. Their first Prague studio, in the basement of a house on Škrétova Street, was a meeting place for friends from the unofficial art scene.

In the early 1980s, she founded the neo-Dadaist collective Rozbřesk (Dawn) with Pavel Baňka and her friends. Over the years, members of the group included, for example, Emma Srnec and Jiří Srnec, Marcela and Jiří Slíva, Dana Zámečníková and Marian Karel, Miroslav Kořínek, Zdenek Sirový and his wife, Jaroslav Beneš, Jana Skalická, and others. Among the visitors were also Jan Schmid and Jana Synková, Václav Lukas, Milada Othová, Ondřej Soukup and Gabriela Osvaldová.

In 1973, Viková was invited to take part in an international competition for artistic ceramics in Faenza, Italy, and the following year she held her first solo exhibition at the Small Gallery of the Czechoslovak Writers' Union in Prague. In 1975, together with Peter Oriešek, she designed her first architectural project – a ceramic relief on the west façade of the Old Town Hall. In 1981, she won one of the main prizes in Faenza and, two years later, became a member of the prestigious international organisation International Academy of Ceramics (IAC). In 1982, Petr Skala made a documentary film about her (The World of Jindra Viková). As a creator of porcelain figurines, she contributed to Jan Bonaventura's animated film based on Andersen's fairy tale The Shepherdess And The Chimney Sweep.

In 1984, she was awarded a Gold Medal at the international ceramics competition in Faenza and, in 1986, the Grand Prix at the Porcelain Triennial in Nyon and a Gold Medal in Vallauris. In 1985, she was visited by the ceramicist and professor Marion Weiss Munk, who invited her and Pavel Baňka to the United States. Viková lectured at Middlesex County College New Jersey and the California School of the Arts and Crafts in Oakland.

From 1973, Viková exhibited at the Internationale Kunstmesse in Munich, and from 1986 she regularly took part in international ceramics symposia and exhibitions. In 1988, she was invited to the 1st International Ceramics Symposium in Canberra under the auspices of UNESCO and worked at the School of Art there. In the same year, she won first prize for ceramics at the International Arts Festival in Baghdad. The following year, her work was featured in a major exhibition of contemporary European ceramics in Auxerre, which subsequently toured several other countries.

In the 1980s, the members of the Rozbřesk group included Magdalena Rychlíková and František Špergl, Helena Samohelová, Ivana Doležalová, Eliška and Rudolf Schránil, Vladimír Suchánek and his wife Zita, Klára Trnková, Jiří Stivín and his wife, Michaela Zindelová, Josef Vomáčka, Blanka Chocholová, Jiří Votruba and Pavel Calda. Rozbřesk organised lectures, local history walks, auctions of absurd items, trips to the mountains, Christmas parties with singing and dancing, flea markets and original theatre production Úšklebky sexu (The Smirks of Sex), directed by Zdenek Sirový and featuring Jiří Bartoška in the role of the narrator. The group Rozbřesk celebrated the fall of communism by staging the Ode to Joy and performing it on New Year's Eve 1989 on Wenceslas Square.

In 1990, Viková took part in a symposium in Römhild, and the following year she spent one academic term as a visiting lecturer at the Art School in Ann Arbor in Michigan. Together with Pavel Baňka, she exhibited at the Jacques Baruch Gallery in Chicago and solo at Galerie L in Hamburg. After 17 years, once again at the Czechoslovak Writer's Gallery in Prague.

In 1992, at the invitation of Jimmy Clark, director of Clay Studio in Philadelphia, she attended a conference organised by the American organisation of sculptors and ceramists ENSICA and was invited to take part in the travelling exhibition Contemporary East European Ceramics held there. Later that same year, she took part in a bone china symposium in Kaunas and two exhibitions in England – the Festival of European Ceramics in Dorset and an exhibition organised by the International Federation of Medallic Art. In the Czech Republic, her work was featured in the major travelling exhibition Sochahlína (Cheb, Prague, Karlovy Vary). She spent most of the following year, 1993, in the United States, where, as a visiting lecturer, she taught for two semesters in the ceramics studio at Ohio University in Athens and spent two months at the Maryland Institute College of Art. In 1994, she was appointed General Commissioner of the competition and curator of the Fletcher Challenge Ceramics Award exhibition in Auckland. The following year, she led a workshop at the University of Canberra, and a year later, she ran the ceramics programme for the abroad semester of Ohio University in Prague.

The year 1997 was a significant one for Viková. Together with her husband, she embarked on a six-month residency at the Sitka Centre for Art and Ecology in Oregon, which had a significant influence on the subsequent work of both artists. There, she befriended the sculptor and founder of the centre Frank Boyden, and created a series of large ceramic busts for an exhibition in Portland.

After 1998, Viková took part in international symposia in Turkey (1998), Denmark and Poland (2000), Italy and Slovakia (2001), Turkey and Poland (2002), Austria (2005), Poland (2007) and on several occasions in Deidesheim, Germany (2007, 2009, 2010). She has lectured on several occasions at universities in the United States (Salem State's Center for Creative and Performing Arts, Oregon, 1998, 2000, Georgia State University, Atlanta, 2000, Santa Ana College, 2000, Long Island University, 2000 and New York University, New York, 2000, 2002, University of Massachusetts Dartmouth, 2002, Willamette University, Salem, 2005, Pingry School of Art, New Jersey, 2008). Since 1990, she has served on international juries for art competitions, and since 2004 she has been a member of the committee of the International Academy of Ceramics, where she represents Central and Eastern European countries. She was asked to select Eastern European artists for the FuLe International Ceramic Art Museum in China.

Since 2002, she has led annual two-week ceramic workshops at the Jarmila Tyrnerová Centre in Kohoutov. In 2014, she curated the Galerie Natura exhibitions at Průhonice Castle and, in 2015, the 'Tribute to Guttfreund' exhibition at the Rabas Gallery, Rakovník.

== Work ==
Viková uses porcelain and fired clay as sculptural materials. Interpersonal relationships have become the central theme of her work. The gestures and expressions of her ceramic sculptures encapsulate fleeting moments etched into memory, as well as feelings, passions and desires.

As early as the 1970s, she was transforming originally functional ceramic objects (Doses, 1974) into free-standing sculptural works. Her early work includes spatial reliefs and figural compositions framed by metal structures, resembling small theatrical scenes (Dice Game, 1978). The subtle and intelligent humour of the stories she tells complements the prints of Adolf Born, with whom she exhibited at the Art-Books Gallery and later in Chrudim. One of her sculptures – an imaginary portrait of a girl with her eyes covered (Decameron, 1979) – was commissioned by the Chamber Association for Music, Poetry, and the Visual Arts Lyra Pragensis. Viková moved on from the playful diversity of her ceramic work to a form of sculpture that is urgent and responsible in both expression and content. Her ceramic sculptures, full of tenderness and imagination, honour the qualities of the material. She finishes the surface as required by painting and glazing it, or leaves it in its raw state.

Painting on glazes plays an important role in the meaning of Viková's works. In a series of relief tiles from the late 1970s, which formed a perfect counterpart to Petra Oriešková's paintings at a joint exhibition at the Fronta Gallery, she uses painting to create the illusion of deep space (Bay, 1978). Both artists were also characterised by an interest in big cats, their movement and the details of their anatomy (Penetration, 1979). Alongside objects depicting a narrative, she shaped a series of metaphorical situations featuring variations on human hand gestures (Plays, 1979) and a cycle of reliefs from a Polish ceramics symposium, which utilised the contrast between smooth porcelain tubes and a painted background and foreshadowed later relief assemblages (An Attempt to Harness the Elements, 1978).

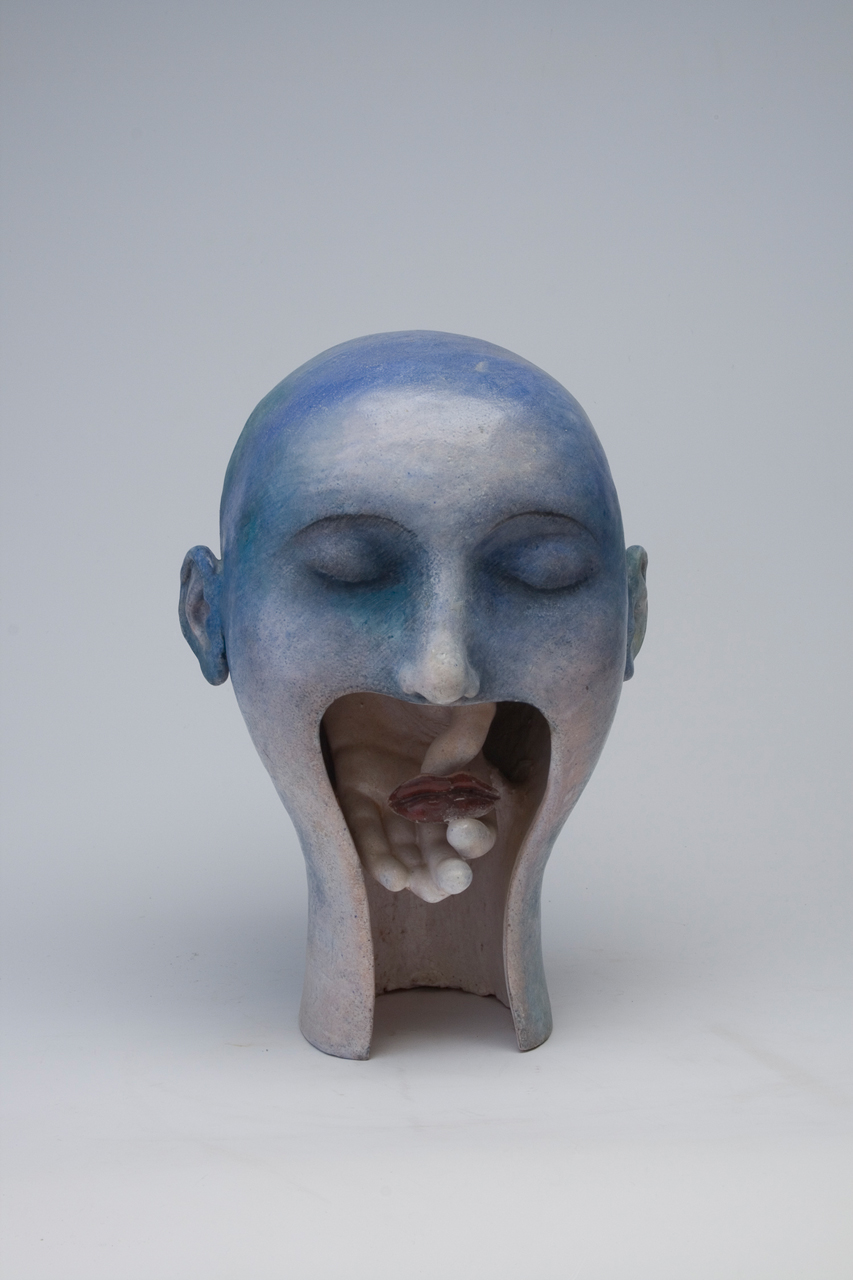
Josephine Baker, 1975

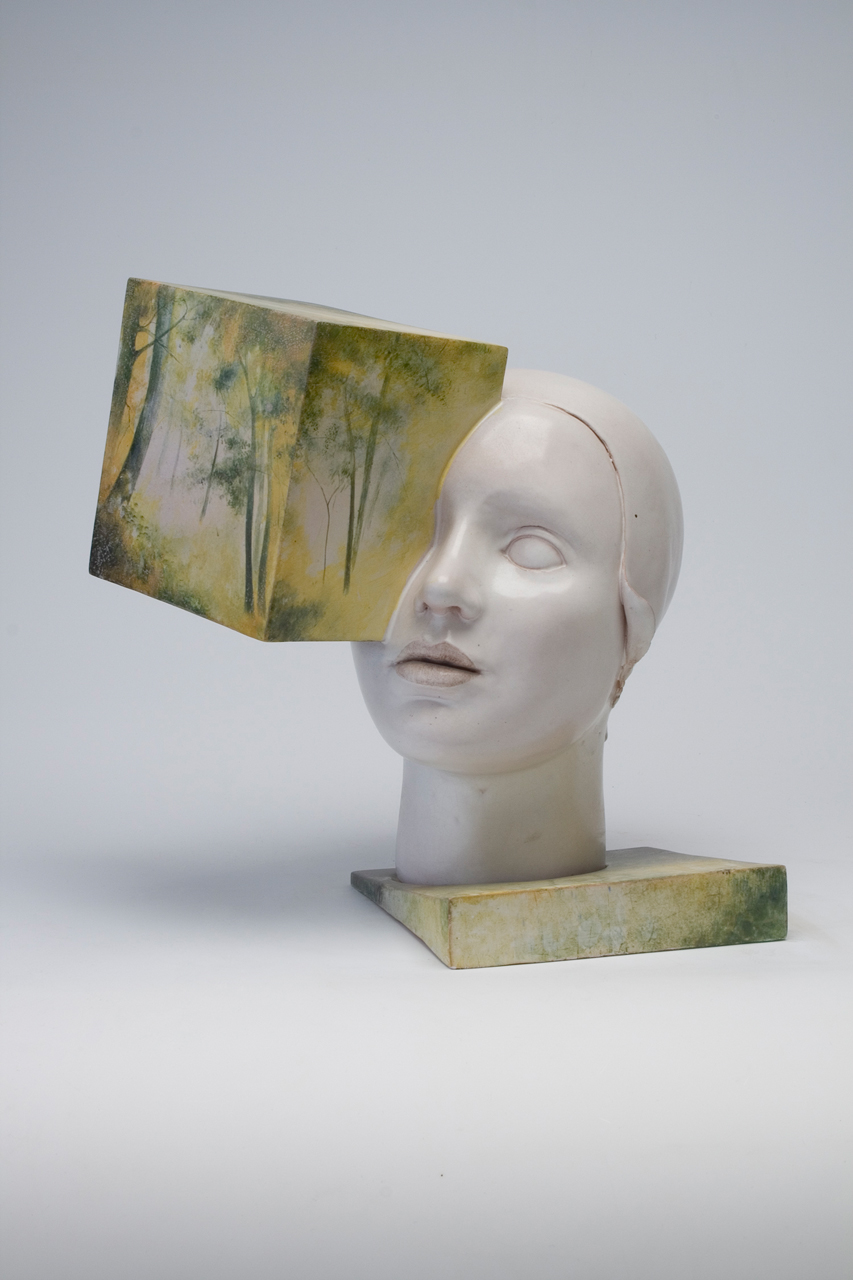
Dice Game, 1978

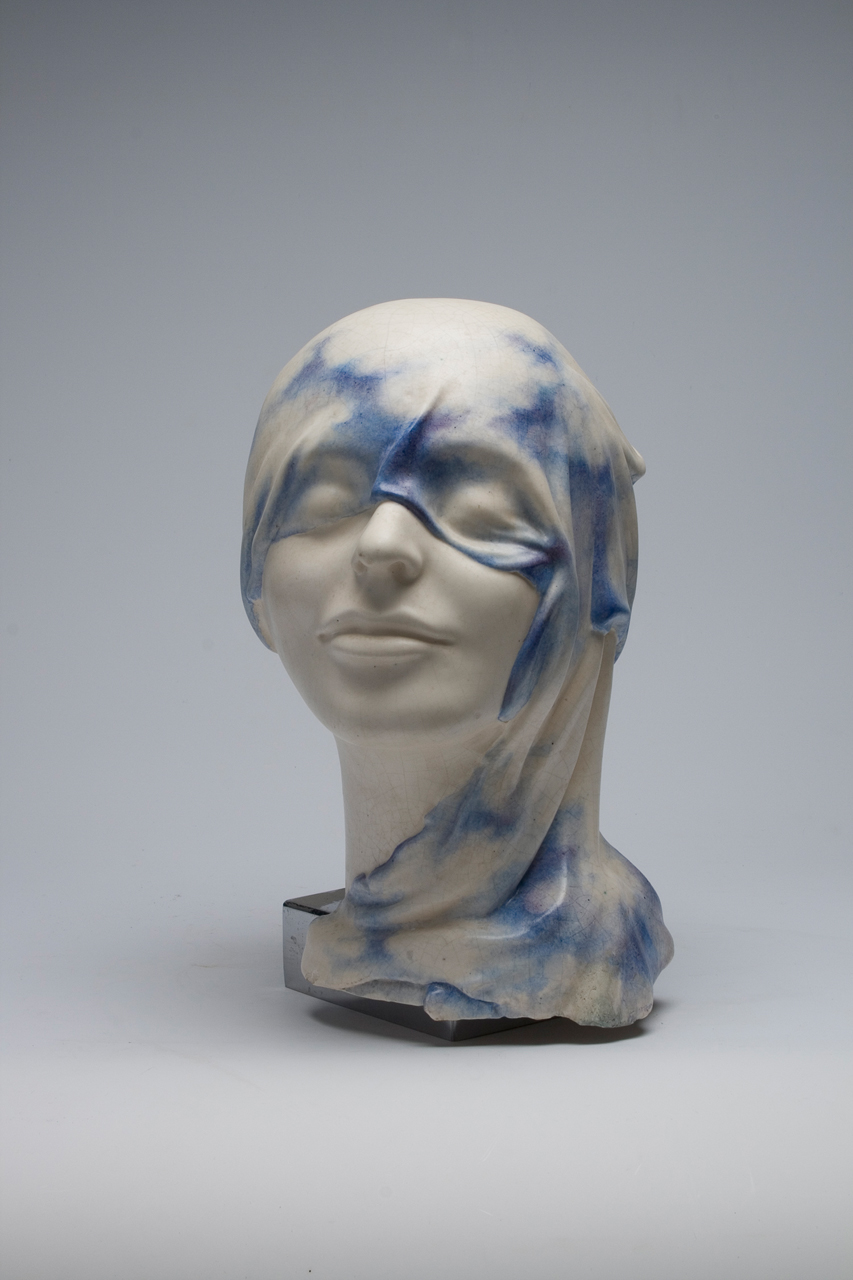
Decameron, 1979

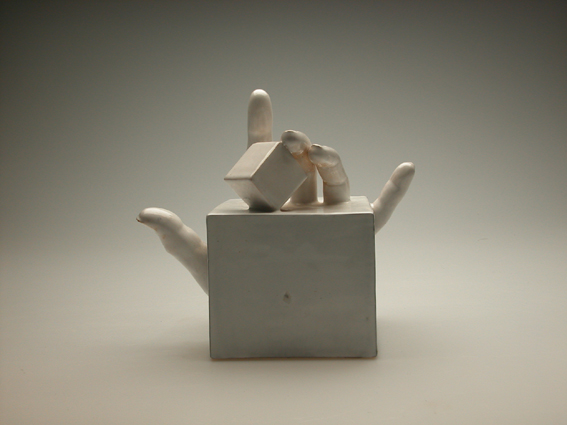
From the cycle Plays I, 1979

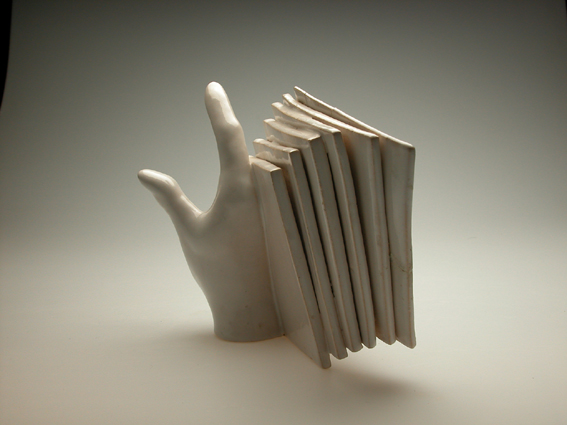
From the cycle Plays II, 1979

The artist's inclination towards figurative art must necessarily have reflected the influences of the era, namely the so-called New Figuration, as well as touches of Pop art and the commercial world of advertising and fashion magazines. Figurative motifs link themes spanning a wide range, from Surrealist imagination to Dadaist tricks. Equally important in her case was her personal experience with Renaissance art, which she encountered in 1969 whilst on her honeymoon in Italy.

From the early 1980s, Viková used thin slices of porcelain, from which she carved silhouettes of human heads and, using visible supports made of the same material, transformed them into three-dimensional objects. The illusory modelling of the face is complemented by abstract designs cast in coloured glazes in low relief. She received an award at the international exhibition in Faenza for one of her earliest works, which was subsequently acquired by the museum there (Conversation, 1981). Jindra Viková then developed this original artistic endeavour, which immediately became her "trademark" and brought her fame, into a whole series of predominantly female porcelain heads (Florence, 1981). In these works, she captures a wide range of expressions, from the gentle irony of the grotesque to facial expressions springing from inner distress and anxiety. The porcelain sheet only takes on its final form in the heat of the kiln, where the thin sheets of porcelain still warp. The demanding technique chosen by Viková represented one of the pinnacles of world ceramics at that time.

In the 1980s, she became an internationally renowned ceramicist, winning awards at prestigious exhibitions. Viková's work is characterised not only by natural feminine delicacy and sensitivity, and at times an almost mannered aestheticism, but also by a different approach which, through a wide variety of artistic means, lends her sculptures an expressive quality (Anonymous, 1987) or elements of playful absurdity. She began creating such sculptures during her working residency in Canberra, when she temporarily abandoned figurative art and returned to classical hollow forms in the Vessels series. She, however, deliberately subjected her works to destruction and transformed them into symbols of uselessness (Vanity, 1989). She followed this with a series of larger-scale sculptures, for which she took the opportunity to work with brick moulds during a symposium in Römhild, Germany (Lassie, 1989), and a subsequent collection of figurative objects combining clay, wood and metal (the Relationships series, 1989–1992). Metal wires create a spatial pattern around the material porcelain sculptures (Delimitation, 1988) and foreshadow a later period of her work, when she used wire silhouettes instead of ceramic materials (Silhouettes, 1999–2004).

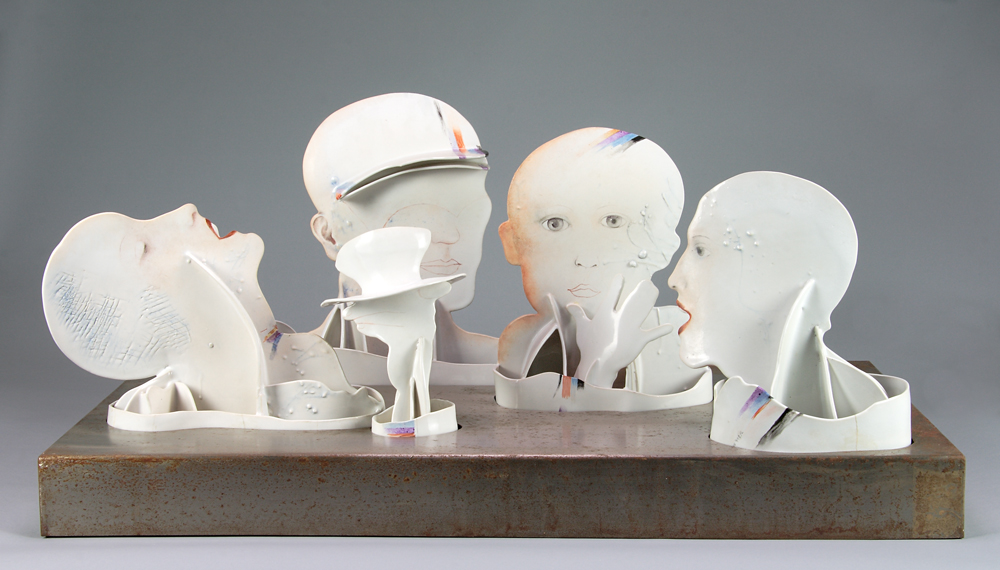
Talk, 1981

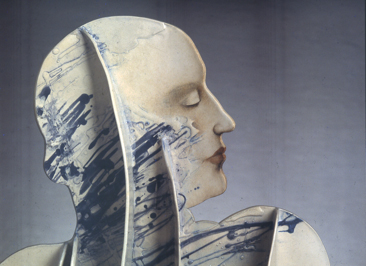
Portrait of Unknown, 1983

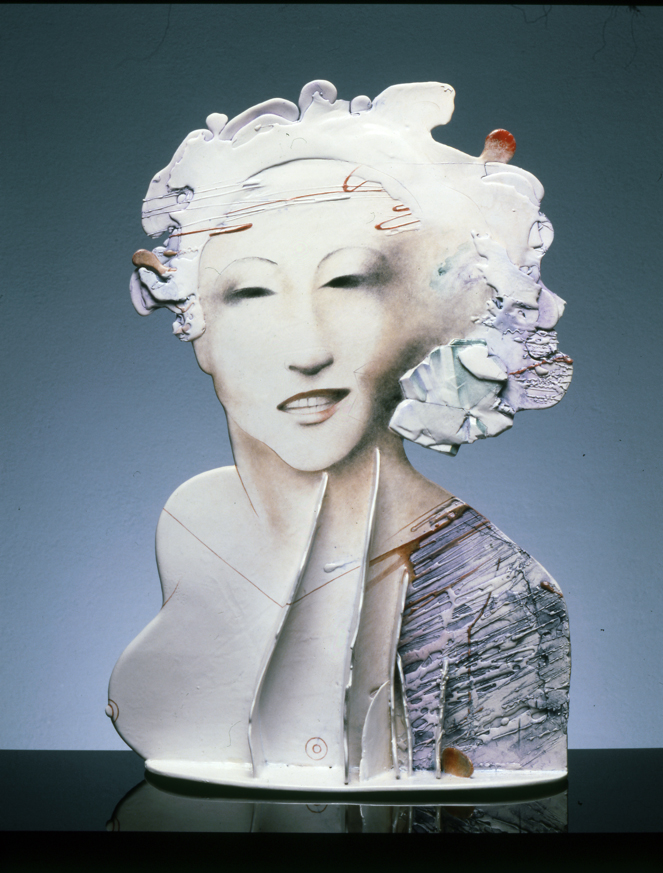
Woman who had It in her Smile, 1983

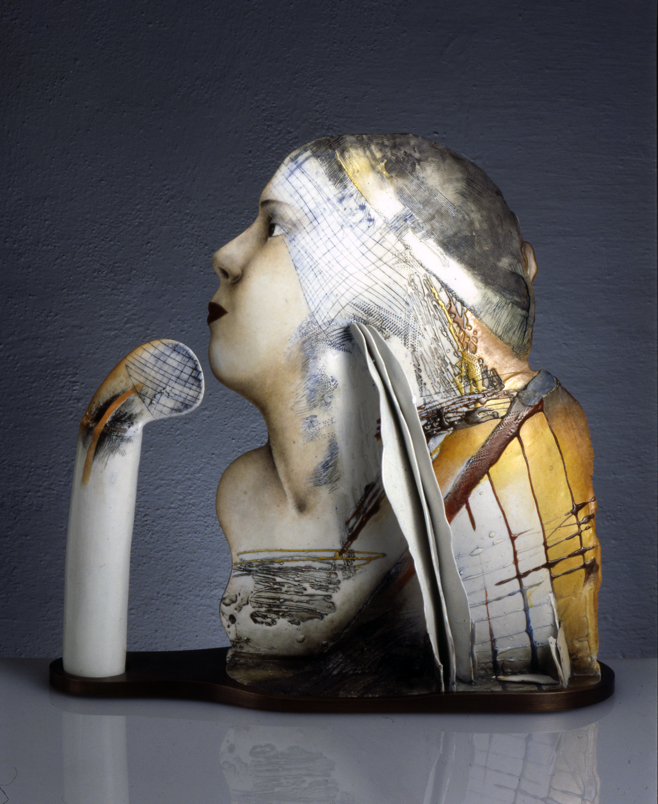
Definition of One Moment, 1986

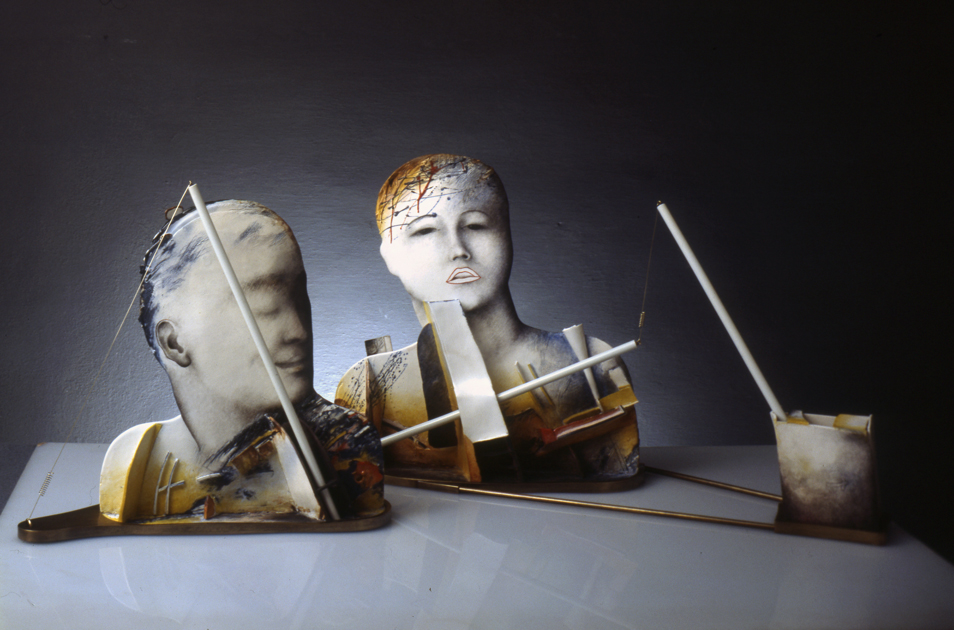
Group, 1986

In the context of a re-evaluation of her previous work and the need to find and master new sources of inspiration, Viková's work in the early 1990s was characterised by a shift towards monumentality, expressive forms and abstraction. The impact of the objects she created, which often bear the symbolic title (Totem 1990), is enhanced by her use of the natural properties of ceramic materials and dark glazes. Her expressive relief ceramic collages (Findings, 1992), her stylised self-portrait in fireclay (Tabula rasa, 1992) and a series of intimate sculptures reflecting interpersonal relationships (the Relationships cycle, 1989–1992). A new phase in her work was heralded by a stay in Kaunas, Lithuania, where she had the opportunity to work with fine, malleable bone china. This material allows her to create delicate forms that are translucent when exposed to artificial light (Waiting for Light, 1992). Later, she utilised the optical properties and fragility of this material, combined with painting and photography, for her intimate reliefs (Fragments, 2009).

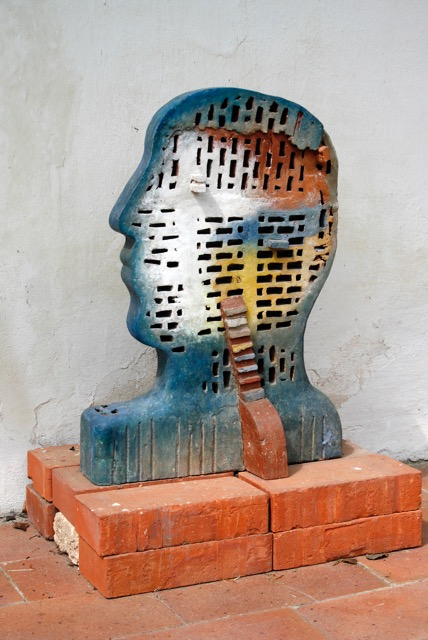
Profile, 1990

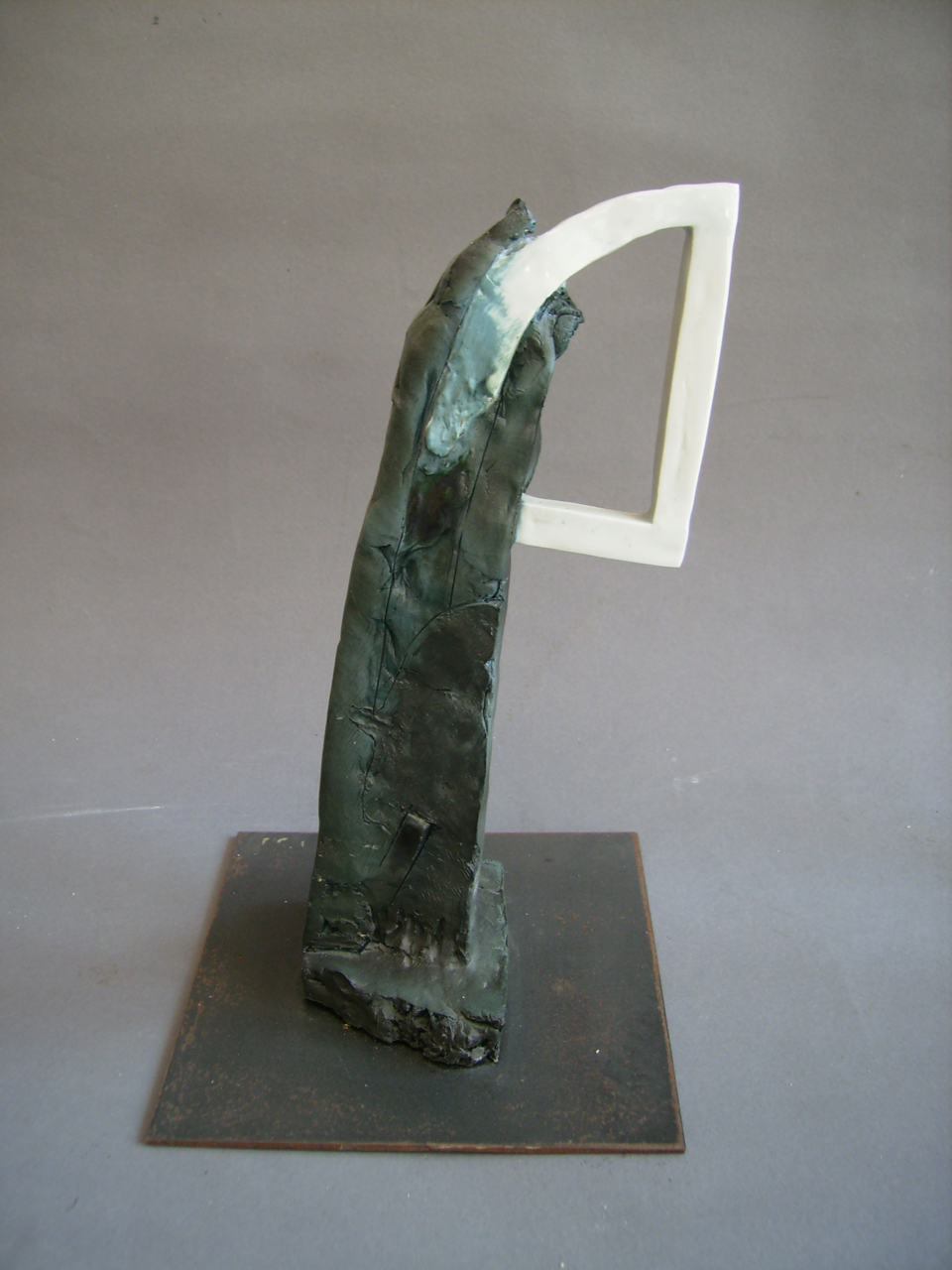
Totem of Loneliness, 1990

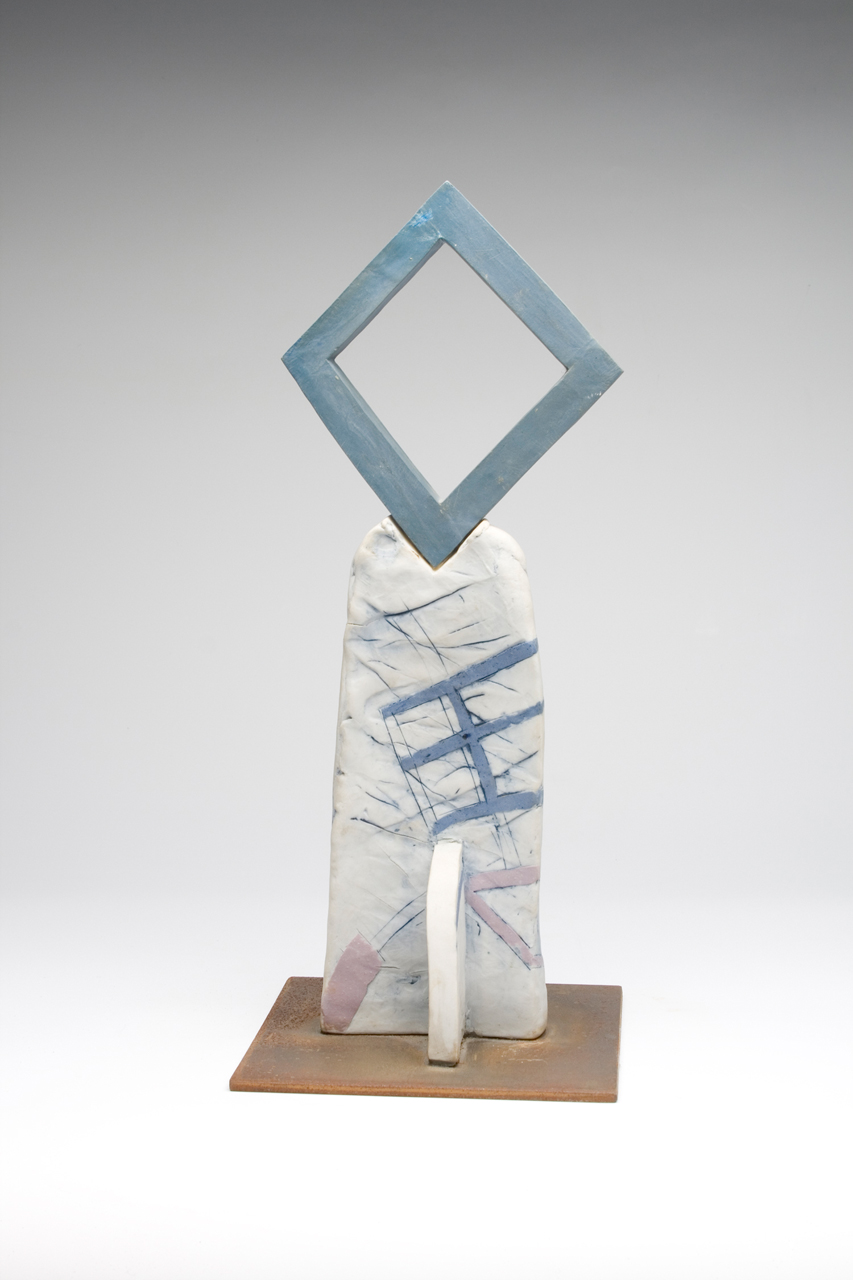
Totem of concentration, 1990

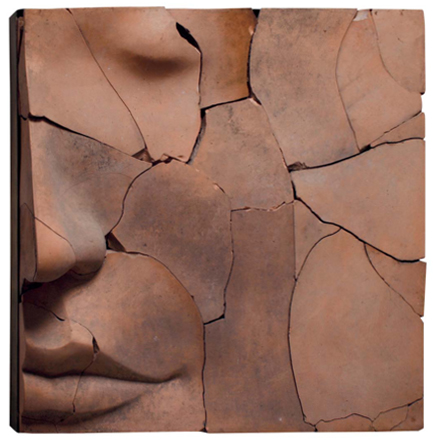
Face, 1991

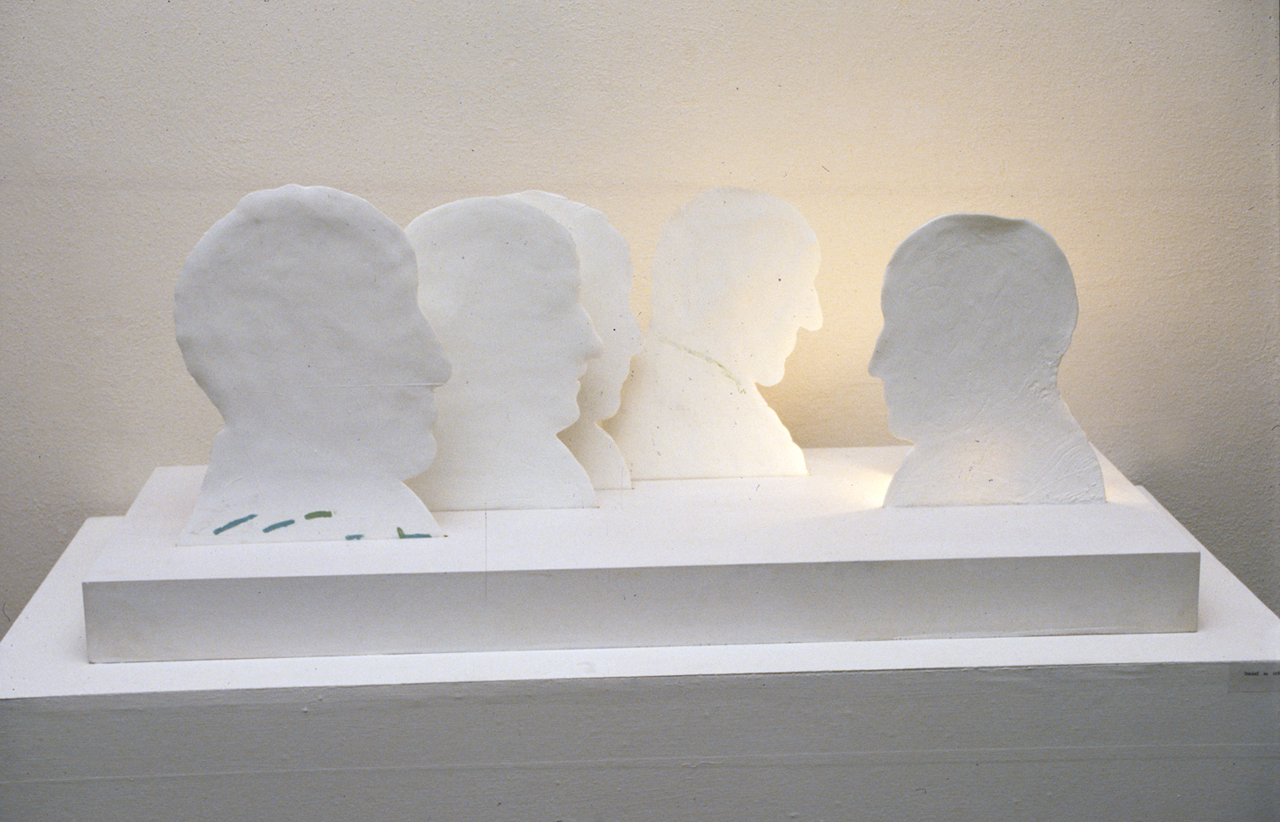
Waiting for Light, 1992

During her stay in the United States, Viková returned to figurative sculptures in stoneware. In the period that followed, she created groups of female figures that take on a partly animal form (Conversation, 1993). Although their physical ambiguity appears natural and unforced, they have a mysterious effect on the viewer and evoke a mystical, dreamlike world that can only be sensed. The life-size half-figures and busts that Viková created in the 1990s, allegorically depict the human condition (With a Beam, 1994, Who Am I?, 1997, Joy, 1997) and gradually lead to a more meditative approach, which also resulted in a sculpture for a niche on Loretánská Street in Prague (St John of Nepomuk, 1995).

In various periods of her career, Viková has focused on small-scale sculpture, thereby reflecting relevant life situations and feelings. In the mid-1980s, this took the form of functional ceramics in the shape of figurative jars (Jars, 1982); around the year 2000, a series of small figurative sculptures entitled Multiplication (2000–2001), Searching for Shelter (2001), Masks (2002), and later, games with ceramic letters on the theme of Love (2004). The light-hearted humour in the Beetles series found expression in small-scale ceramics combined with metal, as well as in drawings and prints (2006–2007).

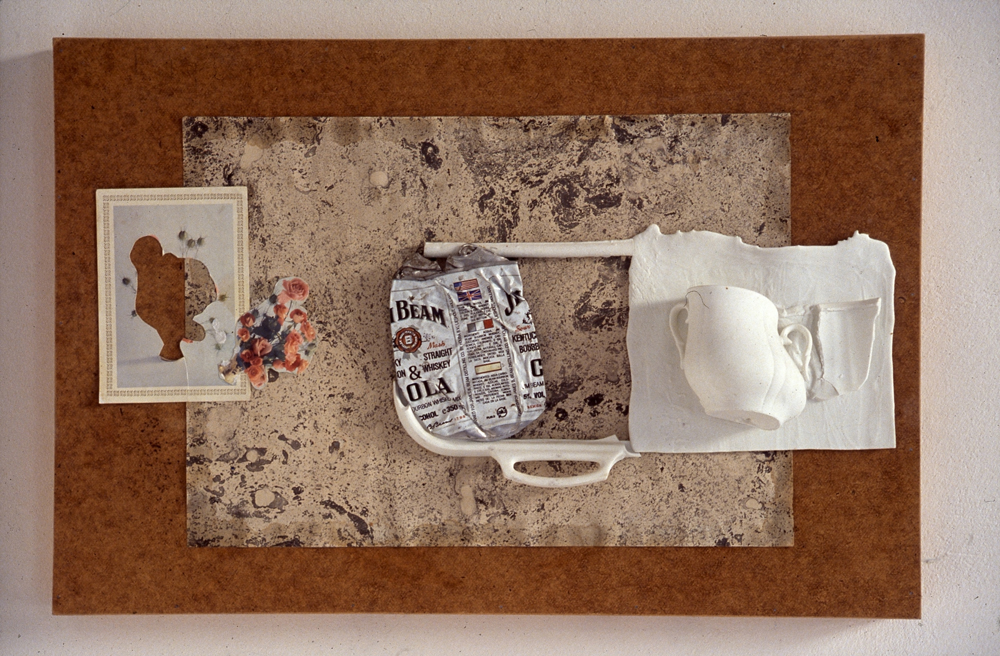
Findings I, 1992

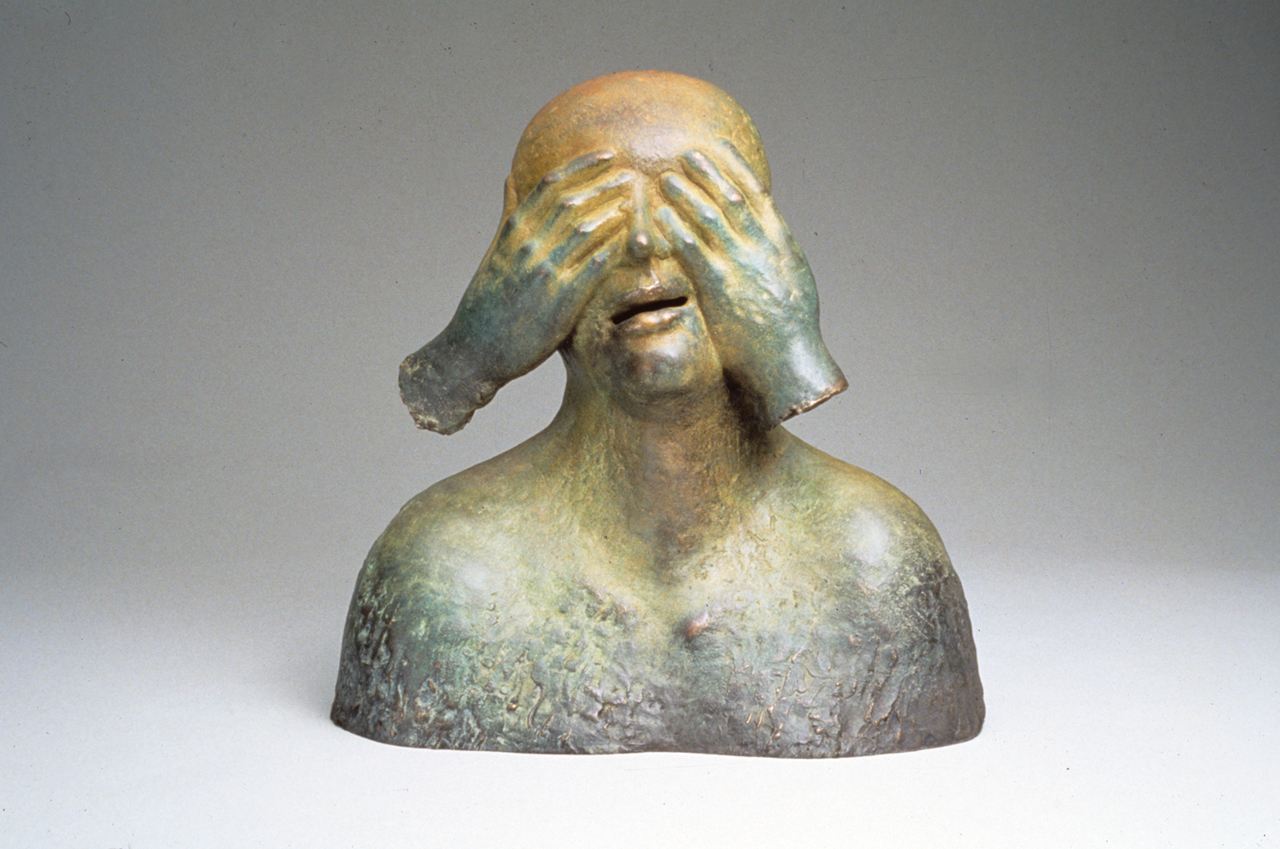
Who am I?, 1997

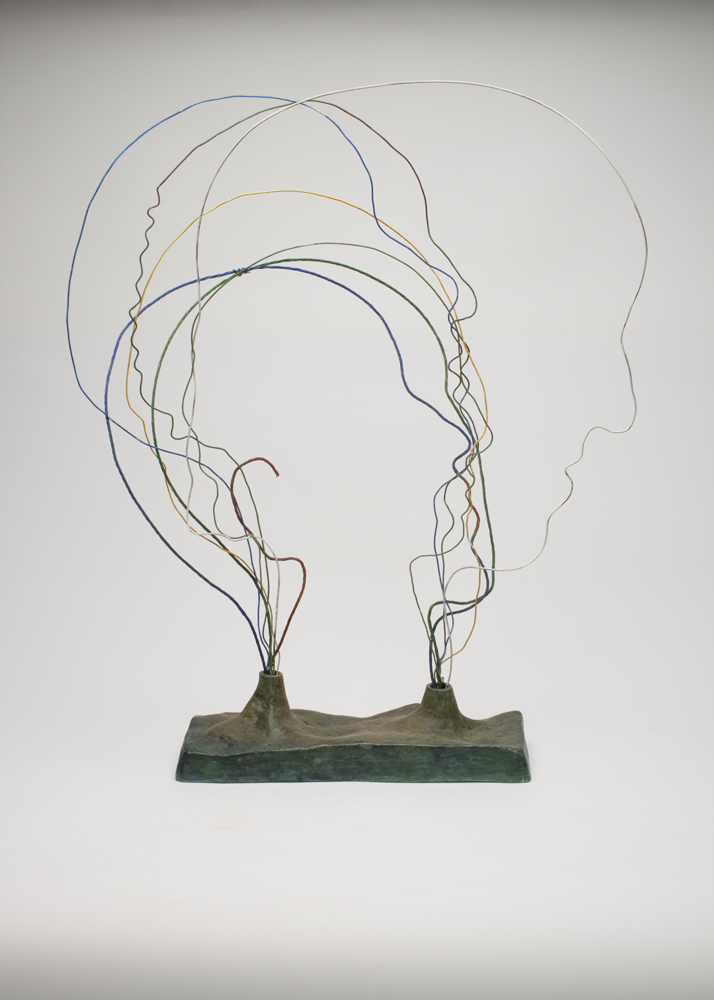
From the cycle Silhouettes III, 1999

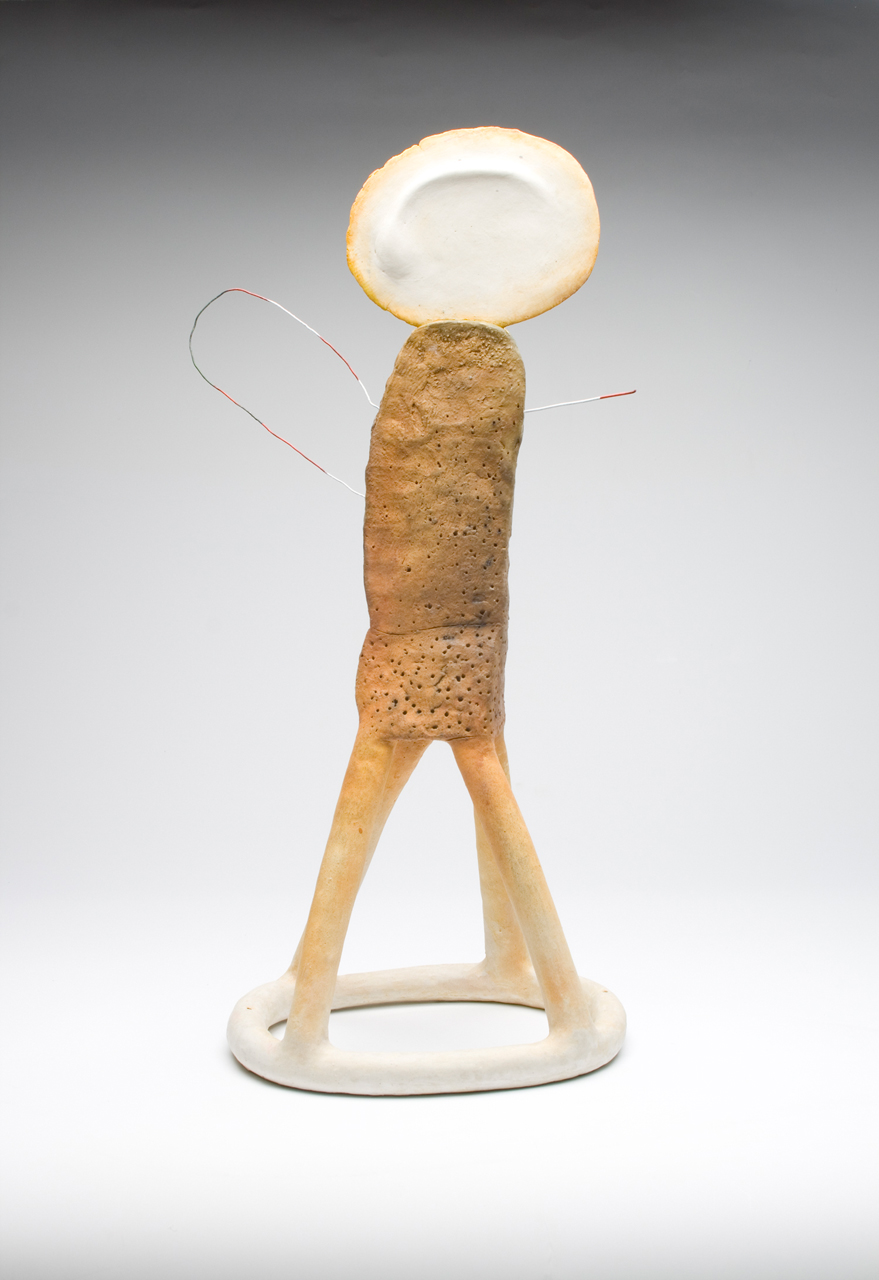
Beetle, 2007

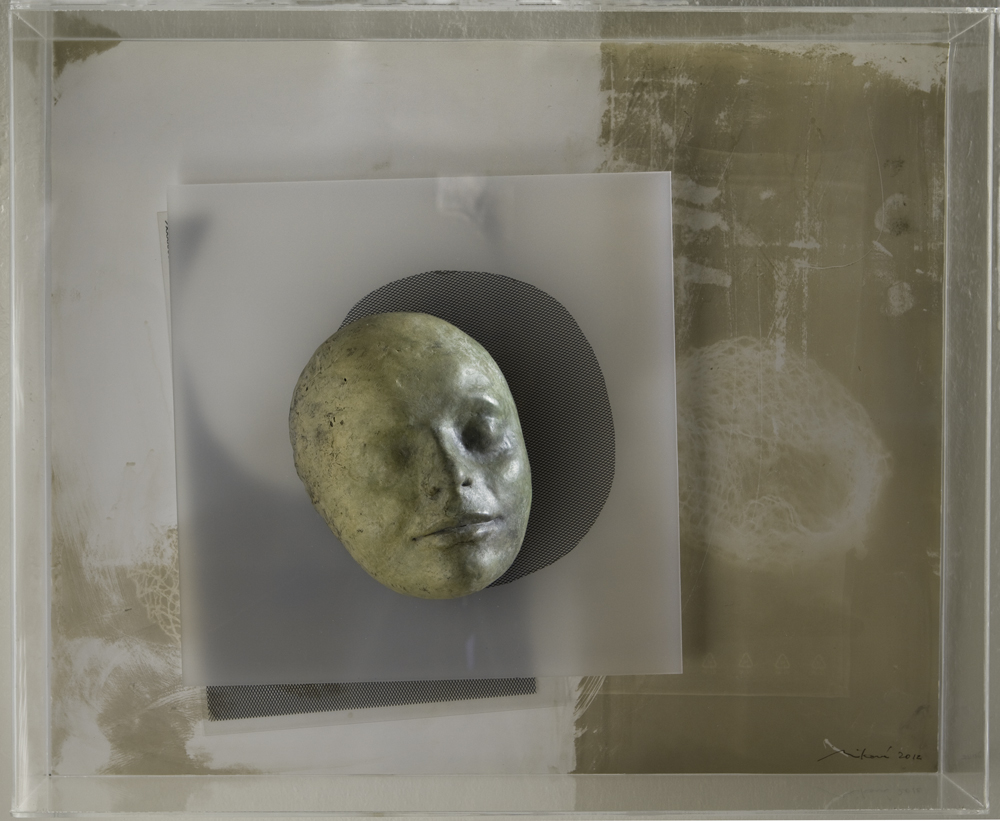
Self-portrait, 2012

Towards the end of the 1990s, Viková began to make greater use of other materials and naturally evolved into a multimedia artist.

Viková has been creating collages on and off since 1997 (Towards Destiny) and uses them to explore more serious themes (Clash of Cultures, 2002, History with a Difference, 1996–2002), including religious iconography (Descent from the Cross, 2008) or humanity's coming to terms with its own mortality (It's Later Than You Think, 2009). Some of these works build on her earlier pieces featuring porcelain silhouettes (Silhouettes with Light, 2008), whilst others juxtapose the human and animal worlds (Leopard with a Swimmer, 2005).

The incorporation of photographic techniques leads to a simplification of expression; descriptive details disappear, leaving behind evocative slogans that evolve into symbols. She develops her assemblages and collages into multi-layered narratives, moving away from intimate relational themes to explore themes of humanity with a transcendental dimension. The photograms sometimes loosely follow on thematically from earlier ceramic series (Games, 1979) and capture, for example, the play of shadows cast by hands (Games, 2002). The theme of Embryos in a series of photograms (1992) is later explored in ceramic figures (Searching for Shelter, 2001) or a hanging picture (2002). The photograms of faces (Feelings, 2003) have a parallel in the series of porcelain assemblages (Faces and Fragments, 2007).

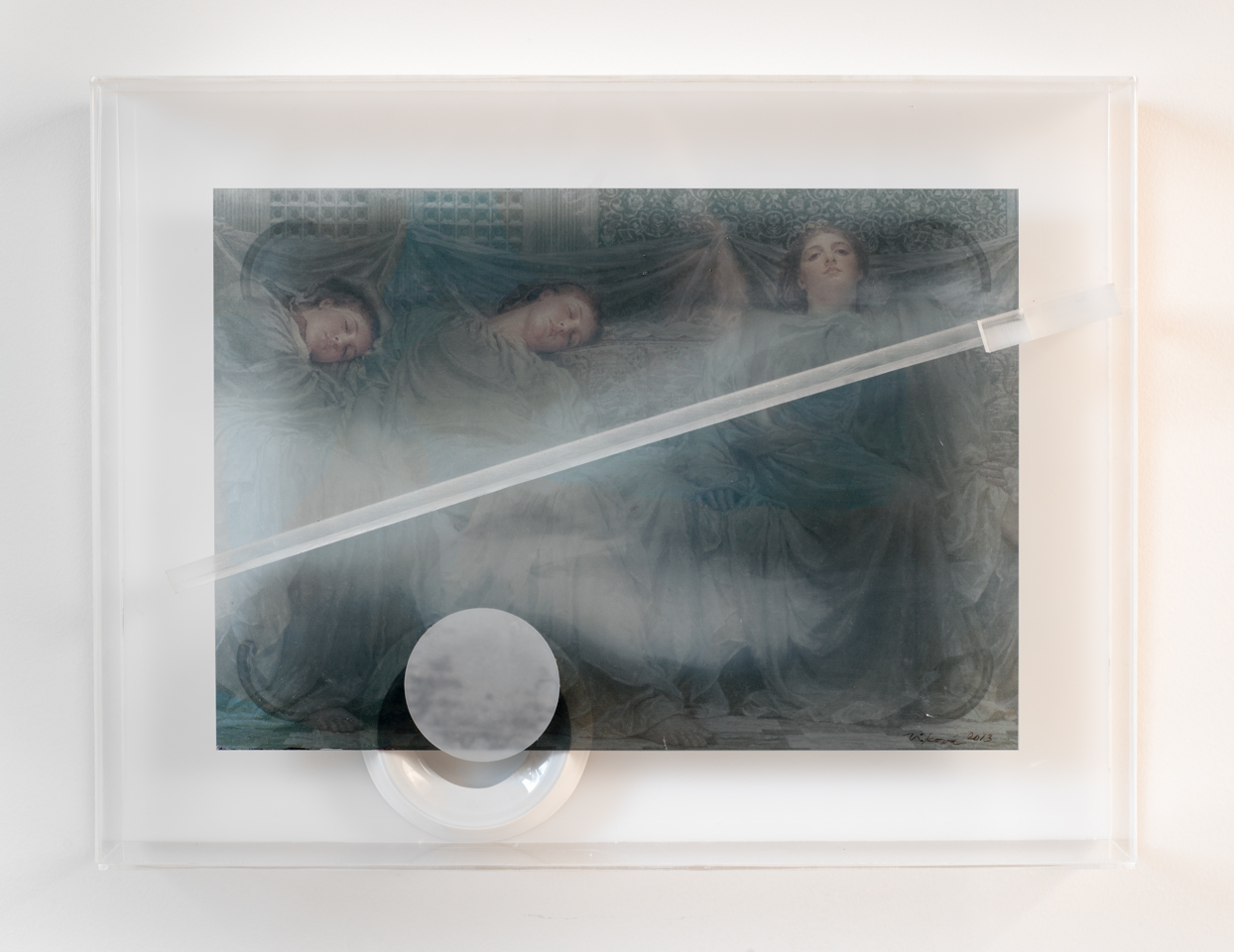
In the harem, 2002

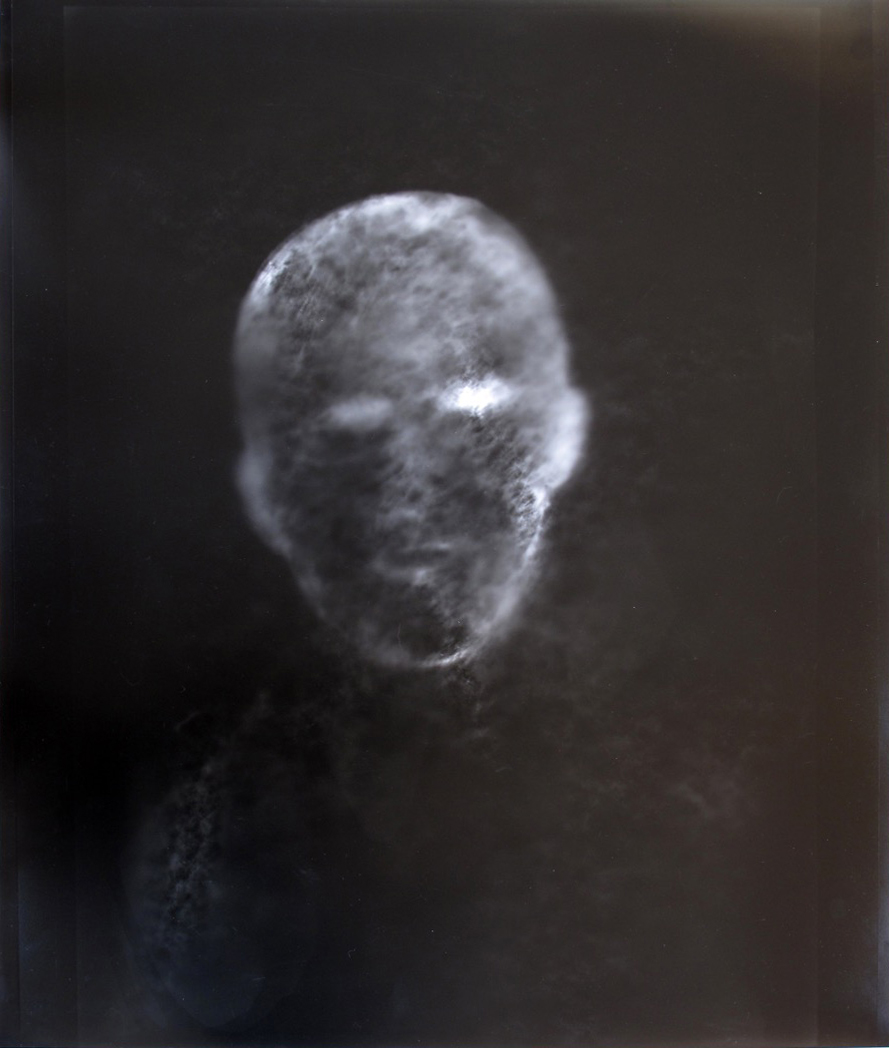
From the cycle Feelings II, 2003

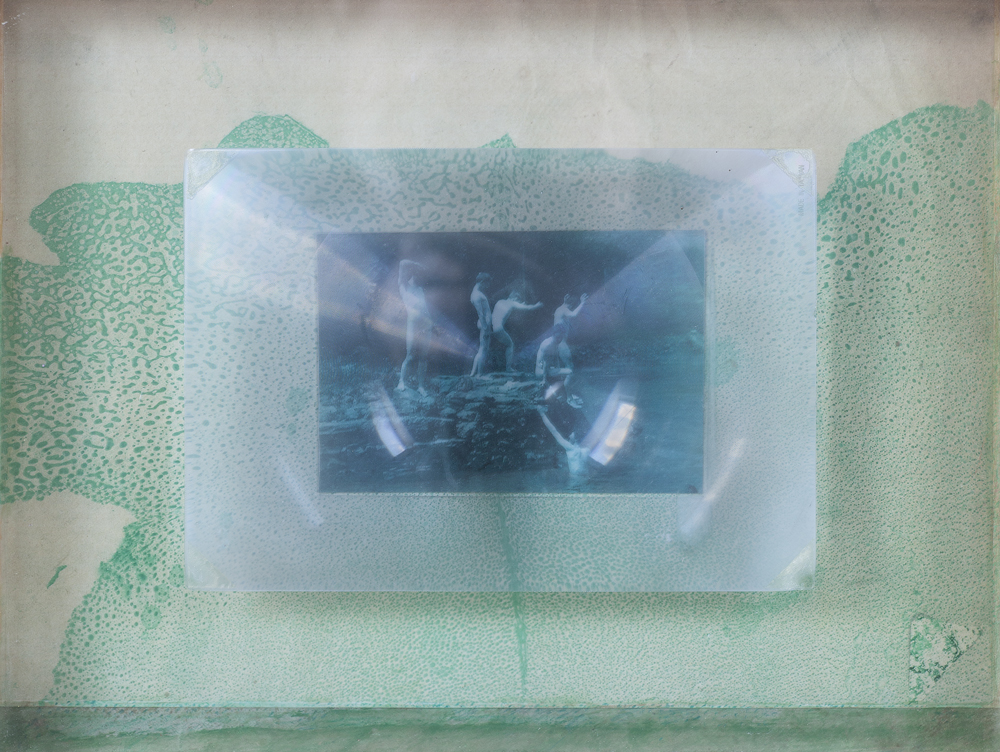
The bathers, 2007

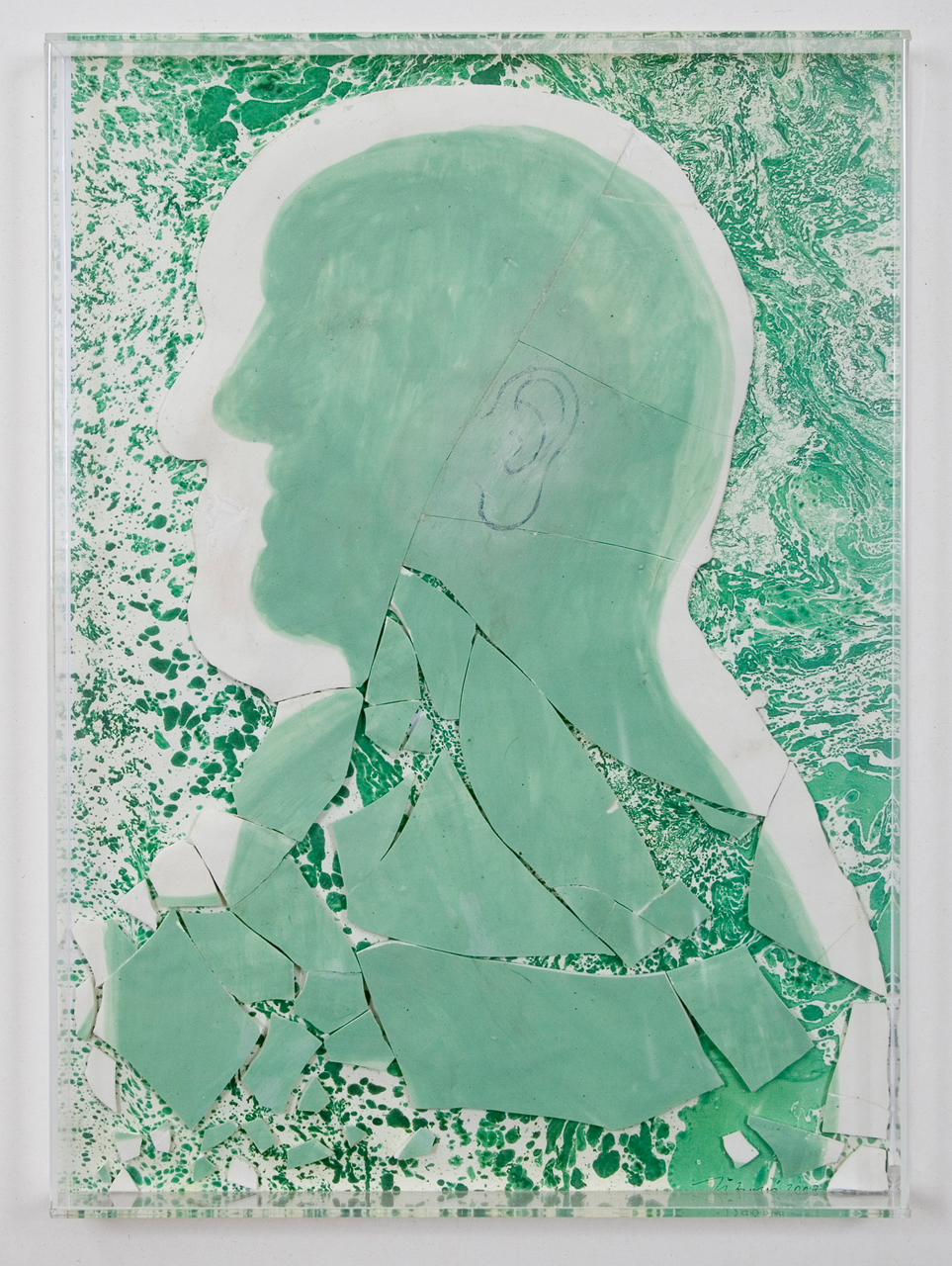
From the cycle Faces and fragments, 2007

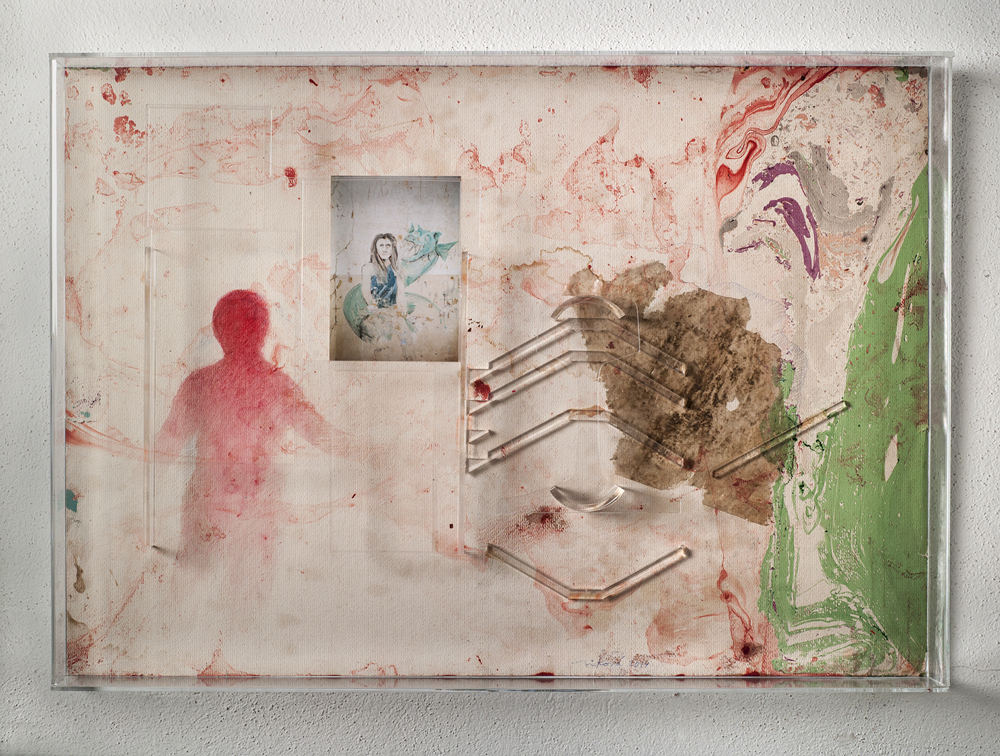
Fleeting moments, 2014

Viková does not create her relief assemblages systematically, and their themes contain a certain element of randomness; nevertheless, they can convey a powerful message Innocence (1996, 2002, 2006), The Soul Leaves the Body (1993), Kafka (2008). In an effort to suspend the transience of time, she recycles found objects and gives them a new lease on life placing them in unexpected contexts. The series Hands (2008) combines wax, plastic and a photogram on sheet metal; with its mediated physicality, it is reminiscent of the works of Eva Kmentová and Alina Szapocznikow. In reality, however, it is a record of a woman's quest for cosmetic beautification and does not seek to be expressive or drastic. In 1992, whilst staying in Oregon, she began working with coloured wires fixed into a ceramic base. Her multi-perspective outlines of heads that interconnect and interflow, create an illusion of fullness and movement.

The uniqueness of Viková's ceramic sculptures lies in her play with contrasting meanings, in the constant tension between the conventions of ceramic art and a sculptural creative approach, between the construction of form and the motif depicted on its surface. Reality, dreams, poetry and myths play an equally significant role in the themes of her work, as do their objectification, symbolic use and abstraction. Viková brings a unique creative approach that has made an important contribution to contemporary ceramics.

Some of Viková's works have been used to illustrate poetry collections by Petr Skarlant, Michal Maršálek and David Železný.

=== Teaching and lecturing ===
- 1991 University of Michigan, Ann Arbor
- 1992-1993 Ohio University, Athens
- 1993 Maryland Institute College of Art, Baltimore
- 1995 University of Canberra
- 1996 International program of Ohio University, Prague
- 2002–2025 Ceramic studio of Jarmila Tyrnerová, Kohoutov
- 2003 School of Fine Arts, University of Connecticut, Storrs
- 2012 Keramikschule, Landshut

=== Representation in collections (selection) ===
- National Gallery Prague
- Museum of Decorative Arts in Prague
- Moravian Gallery in Brno
- Aleš South Bohemian Gallery, International Museum of Ceramics Bechyně
- Museum Kampa
- Gallery of Fine Arts in Cheb
- West Bohemian Gallery, Plzeň
- AMOCA - American Museum of Ceramic Art, Los Angeles
- Walla Walla Foundry, Washington, D.C.
- Silbers Collection, Laguna Beach, California
- Clay Studio, Philadelphia
- FuLe International Ceramic Art Museum, Fuping, China
- Museo internazionale delle Ceramiche, Faenza
- Han Hyang Lim Gallery and Jay Lee Collection, South Korea
- Icheon World Ceramic Center, South Korea
- Museums Victoria, Melbourne
- Powerhouse Museum, Sydney
- Auckland Institute and Museum, New Zealand
- Guldagergaard (International Ceramic Research Center – Denmark), Skælskør
- Keramion, Museum für zeitgenössische keramische Kunst, Frechen, Germany
- Museum of Modern Art, Deidesheim, Germany
- Waldbad Römhild - museum for ceramics, Germany
- Würtenbergisches Landesmuseum, Stuttgart, Germany
- Musée Ariana (Musée suisse de la céramique et du verre), Geneva
- International Ceramic Studio Kecskemét, Hungary

Viková's works are represented in a number of private and public collections abroad. For further details, see abART - and

=== Works in public space ===
- Ceramic mosaic, the rear (northern) facade of the Old Town Hall in Prague (with Peter Oriešek), 1975
- Series of sculptures, Dolní Dvořiště Customs Office, 1978 (destroyed)
- Fountain, Atrium Gallery, Prague (with Peter Oriešek), 1983
- St John of Nepomuk, Loretánská Street, Prague, 1995
- Garden sculpture, private residence in Prague-Klánovice, 1997
- Porcelain Heads, Hotel Přední Labská
- Conversation (three sculptures), Park Holiday, Prague-Benice
- Bronze head, Sitka Center for Art and Ecology, Oregon
- Mary, niche in a house, Špalíček, Cheb
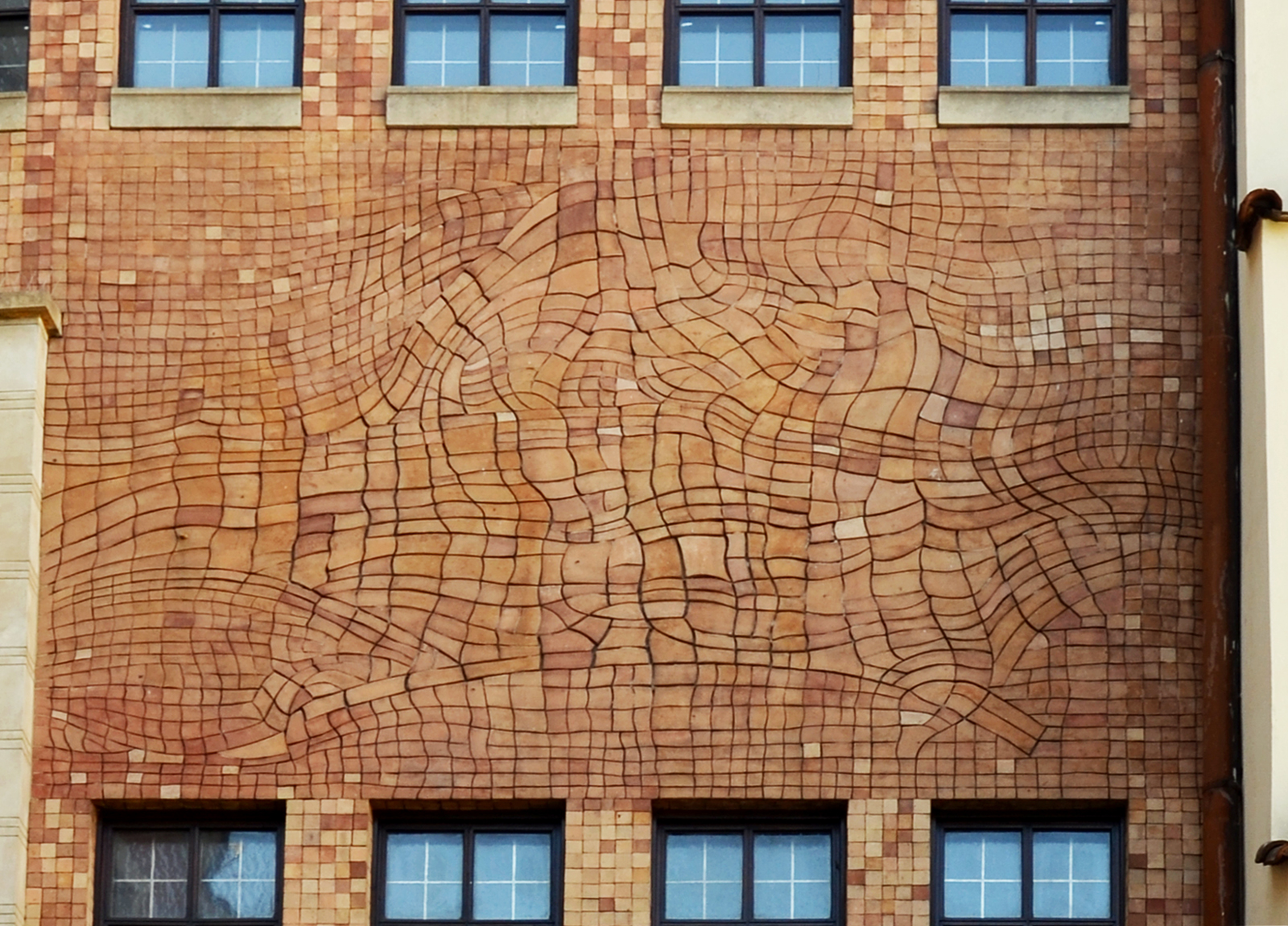
Peter Oriešek, Jindra Viková, Ceramic mosaic, façade of the Old Town Hall in Prague

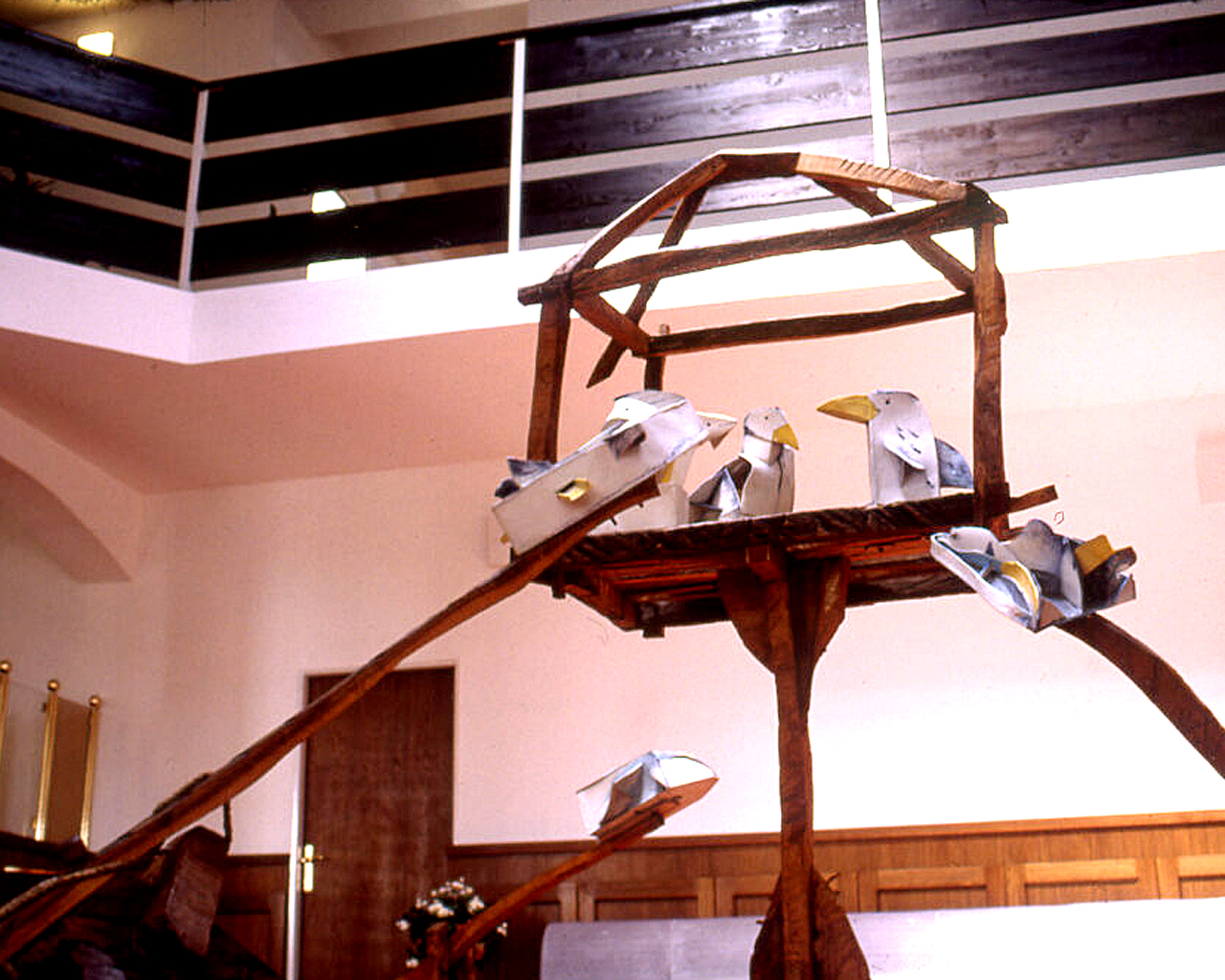
Jindra Viková, Series of sculptures, Dolní Dvořiště Customs Office, 1978 (destroyed)

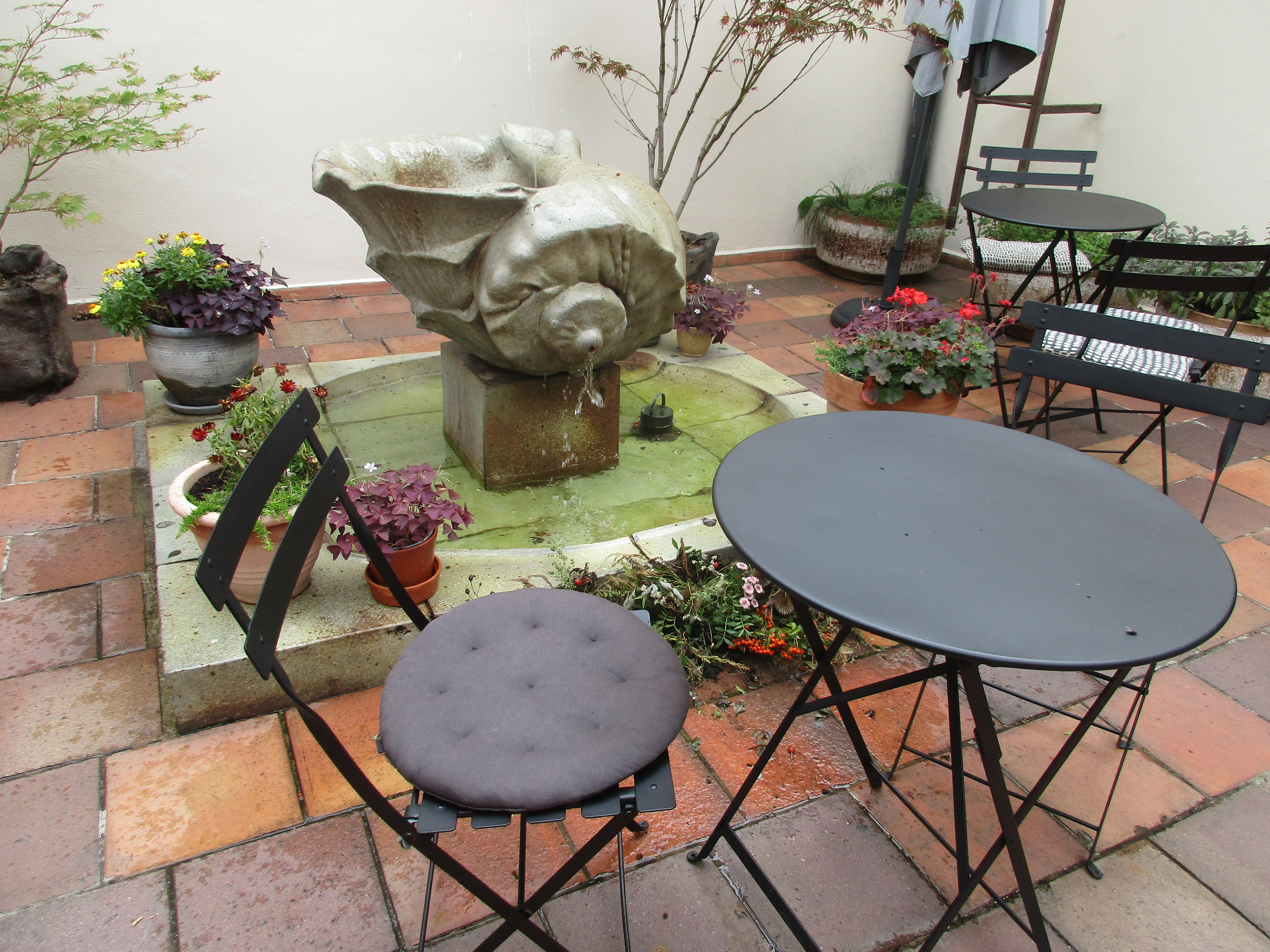
Peter Oriešek, Jindra Viková, Fountain, Atrium Gallery, Prague

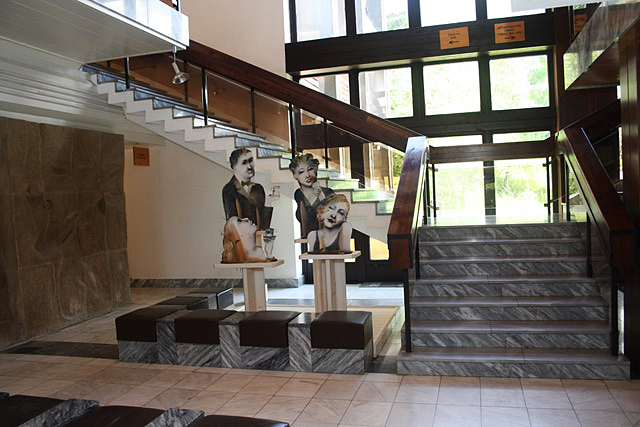
Jindra Viková, Porcelain Heads, Přední Labská hotel 1986

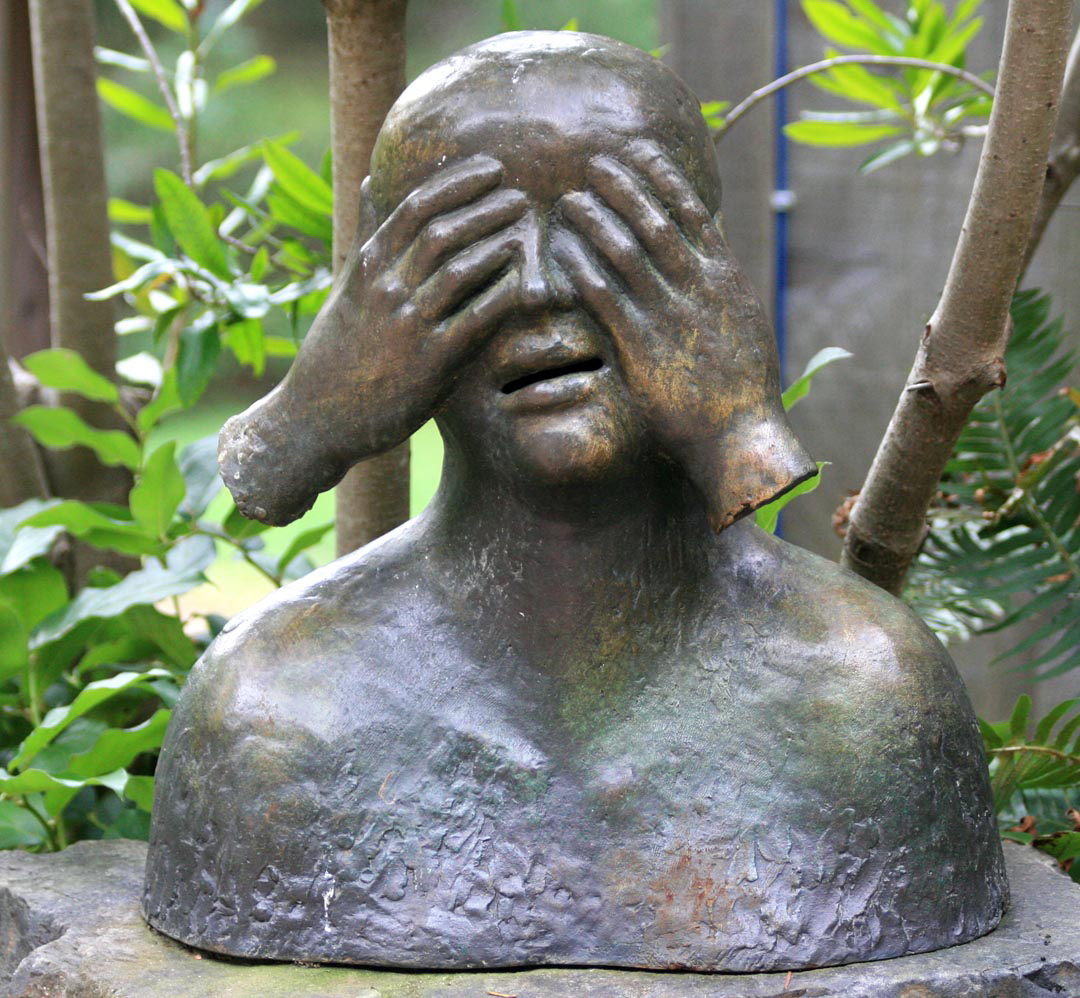
Jindra Viková, Who am I?, bronze, Sitka Center, United States

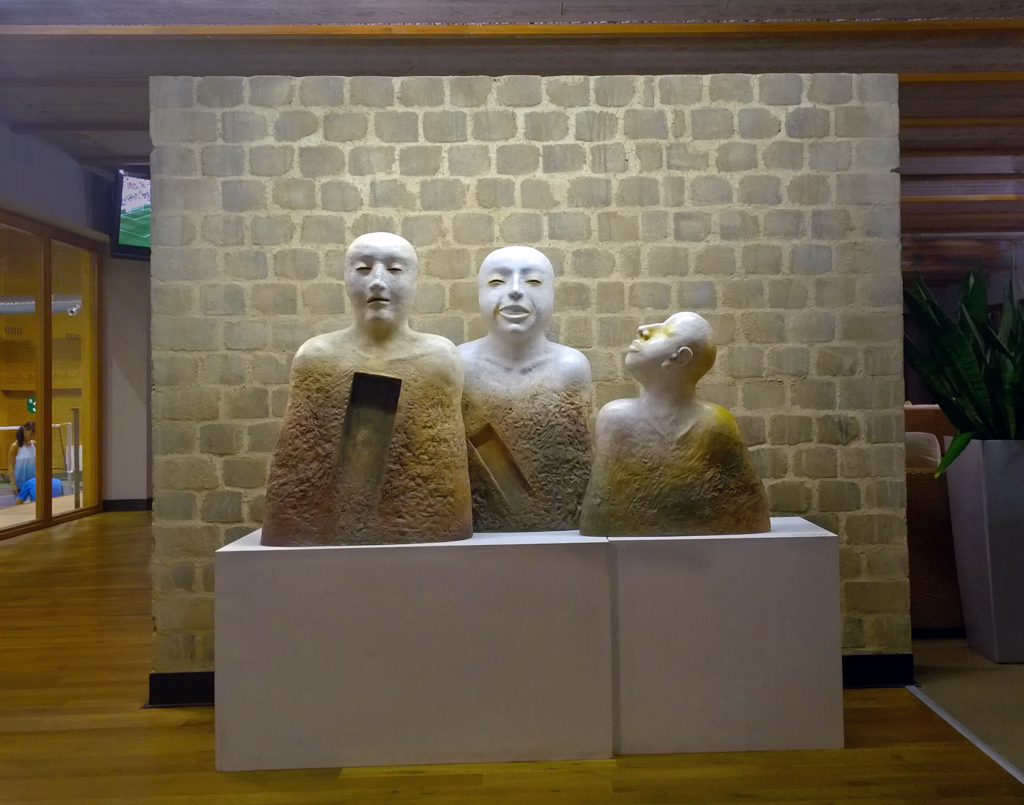
Jindra Viková, Conversation, fireclay, Holiday park Prague-Benice, 1994

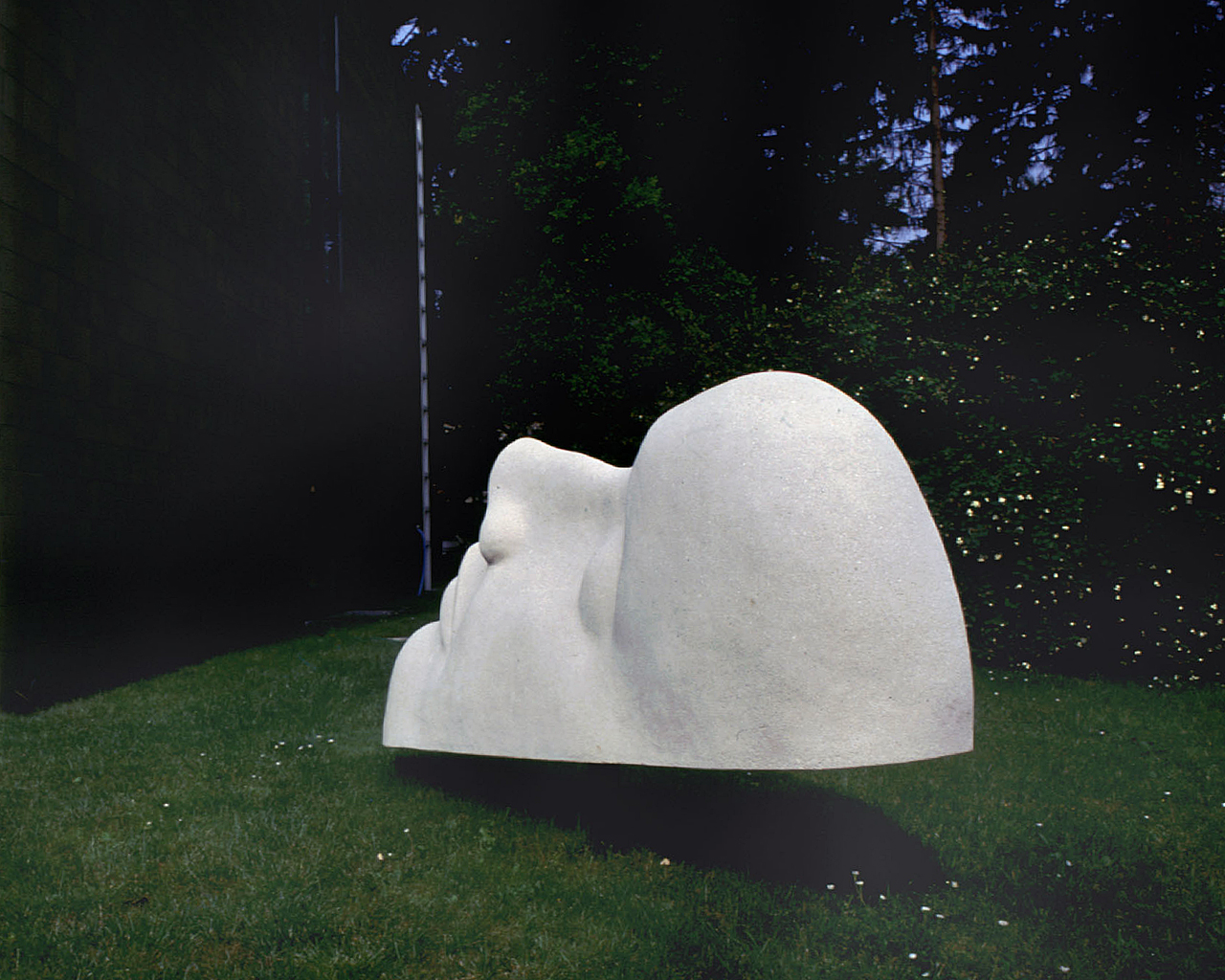
Jindra Viková, Garden Sculpture, 250 cm, Prague-Klánovice 1997

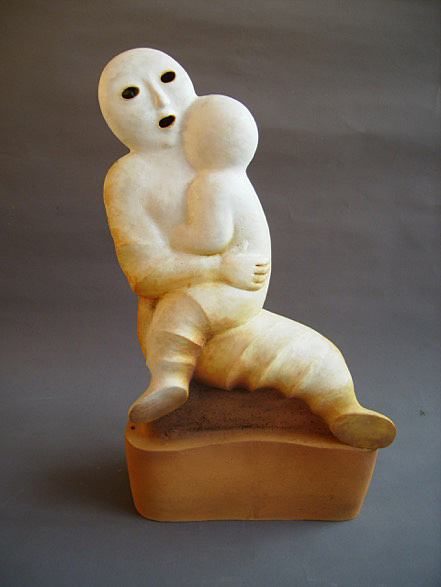
Jindra Viková, Mary for the niche in Špalíček, Cheb

=== Films ===
- 1982 The World of Jindra Viková, directed by Petr Skala
- 1983 Porcelain figures and set design for the TV film The Shepherdess and the Chimney Sweep (41 mins), directed by J. Bonaventura

=== Exhibitions ===
Viková has been exhibiting regularly since 1974. For a detailed overview of her solo and group exhibitions, see abART: Jindra Viková - Exhibitions / events

== Sources ==
=== Catalogues (selection) ===
- Keramika a kresby Jindry Vikové / Ceramics and drawings of JV, text Hofmeisterová Jana, cat. 6 p., Malá galerie Čs. spisovatele, Prague, 1974
- Jindra Viková: Keramika / Ceramics, text Myslivečková Olga, cat. 8 p., JKP Chrudim, 1977
- Jindra Viková: Figurální keramika / Figural ceramics, text Kříž Jan, cat. 16 p., SZK ROH Benar, Litvínov, 1982
- Jindra Viková - keramika / ceramics, Petra Oriešková - obrazy / paintings, text Kříž Jan, Galerie Fronta, 1983
- Jindra Viková - keramika / ceramics, text Kříž Jan, typography Lamr Aleš, cat. 32 p., 1986
- Jindra Viková, text Lovišková Danica, kat. 20 s., Galéria M.A. Bazovského, Trenčín, 1986
- Keramische skulpturen von Jindra Viková, texts Finckenstein Charlotte von, Vlček Tomáš, Galerie L, Hamburg, 1991
- Jindra Viková, Czech porcelain Dubí, 2004
- Jindra Viková: Tváře Fragmenty / Faces Fragments, cat. 12 p., Museum Kampa, Prague, 2009
- Jindra Viková: Vztahy / Relationships, text Zemánková Terezie, cat. 32 p., Rabas gallery Rakovník, 2012
- Jindra Viková: Prchavé okamžiky / Fleeting Moments, texts Víchová Ilona, Zemánková Terezie, Baňka Pavel, cat. 36 p., Topičův salon, Prague 2016, ISBN 978-80-260-9492-0

=== Monographs ===
- Milena Klasová (ed.), Jindra Viková, Prague 1997
- Terezie Zemánková (ed.), Jindra Viková, odkazy a návraty / referrals and returns, Prague: Kant, 2010, ISBN 978-80-7437-011-3
- Jindra Viková, Je později než si myslíš / It´s Later than You Think, Pragur: Kant, 2018, ISBN 978-80-7437-251-3
- Michaela Zindelová, Jindra Viková: Kdo jsem? Ohlédnutí za mým životem a dílem.../ Who Am I? A Glimpse into My Life and Work..., Stará pošta, Brno 2025, ISBN 978-80-908084-9-2

=== Encyclopedias ===
- Růžička M, Vlček T, Současná keramika / Contemporary Ceramics, Prague: Odeon, 1979
- Speight Ch. F., Hands in Clay: An Introduction to Ceramics, Mayfield Publ. Co., Mountain View 1989, ISBN 978-0874848489
- Rada P, Ceramic Techniques, Hamlyn, London 1989 ISBN 978-0600561545
- Klinge E, Jahn G, Keramik des 20. Jahrhunderts: Sammlung Welle, Du Mont 1996, ISBN 978-3770138593
- Flynn M, Ceramic Figures; A directory of Artists 2002, Rutgers Univ Pr, ISBN 978-0813532059
- Peterson S, Contemporary Ceramics, Thames & Hudson and Calman/King, London 2000
- Scot P, Painted Clay, A & C Black, London 2001, ISBN 0-7136-4754-X
- World-Famous Ceramic Artist's Studios, Vol. 2 Europe, Bai Ming, Bei Jing China 2005
- Ostermann M, The Ceramic Narrative, A & C London, Univ. Pennsylvania Press, London-Philadelphia 2006, ISBN 0713668830
- Modern 20th-century Ceramics: Inventory Catalogue of the Hinders/Reimers Collection by Ingrid Vetter, Arnoldsche 2007, ISBN 9783897902756
