= Jindra =

Jindra may refer to:

- Jindra (given name), a Czech feminine given name
- Jindra (surname), a Czech surname
- 3515 Jindra, a main-belt asteroid named after Lumír Jindra
