= Jindrak =

Jindrak is a surname of Czech and Slovak origin. It is derived from a diminutive of the Slavic personal name Jindřich, – itself ultimately deriving from the German name Haimirich, meaning "ruler of the home." Notable people with the surname include:

- Karl Jindrak (born 1972), Austrian table tennis player
- Mark Jindrak (born 1977), American businessman, former professional wrestler, and actor
