= Maria Bofill =

Spanish ceramist (1937–2021)

Maria de Cervelló Bofill i Francí (1937 – 30 March 2021) was a Spanish Catalan ceramist.

== Career ==
Bofill was born in Barcelona in 1937. She began training in 1953 at Escola Massana and in the potter's workshop of Jordi Aguadé i Clos, where she worked between 1956 and 1961.

In 1969 she won a scholarship from the Castellblach Art Foundation to study in Tokyo. Thus, she did guest internships as a research professor at the Hammersmith College of Art and Building (London, England), Sunderland Polytechnic of Art and Design (Sunderland, England), Kyoto City University of Arts (Kyoto, Japan), Universidad Veracruzana (Veracruz, Mexico), Hartwick College (New York, USA), Triennale de la Porcelaine (Nyon, Switzerland), University of Haifa (Israel), European Ceramics Work Center (Hertogenbosch, Holland), Atelier de Céramique Artistique Méditerranéenne (Hammamet, Tunis) and International Symposium on Ceramics in Siklos (Hungary), among others. She has been awarded in various competitions and her work is part of prestigious art collections.

The source of her inspiration was mainly natural elements, although on some occasions architectural elements as well and her. Bofill was also member of the International Academy of Ceramics until her death.

== Death ==
She died of COVID-19 on 30 March 2021 during the pandemic in a hospital in Barcelona, where she was infected after being admitted for a surgical intervention related to the cancer she suffered.
