= Jindra (surname) =

Jindra (feminine: Jindrová) is a Czech surname. It is a shortened form of the given name Jindřich. A dialectical form of the surname is Indra. Notable people with the surname include:

- Alfréd Jindra (1930–2006), Czech sprint canoeist
- Aleš Jindra (born 1973), Czech football player and coach
- Jan Jindra (1932–2021), Czech rower
- Josef Jindra (born 1980), Czech ice hockey player
- Ladislav Jindra (1921–2026), Czech-American soldier
- Otto Jindra (1896–1932), Czech military pilot
