= Kohoutov =

- Municipality
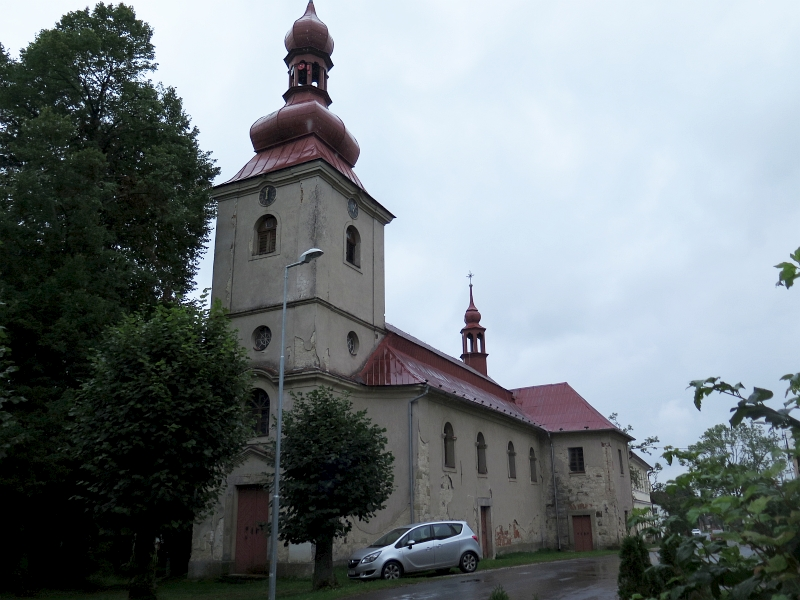
- Church of the Assumption of the Virgin Mary

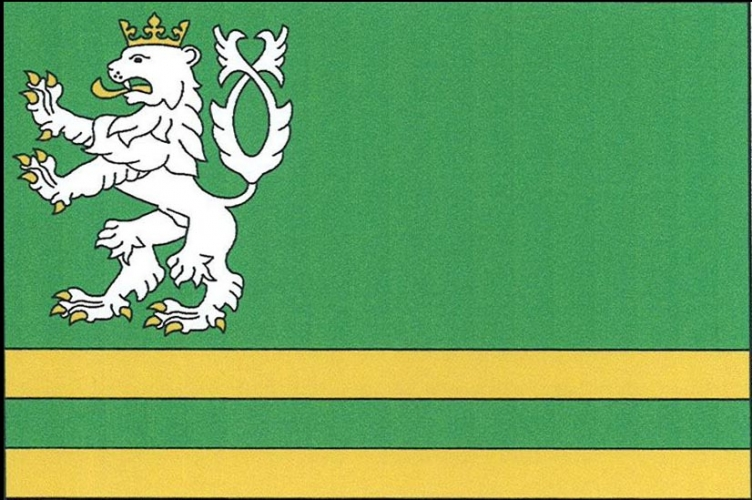
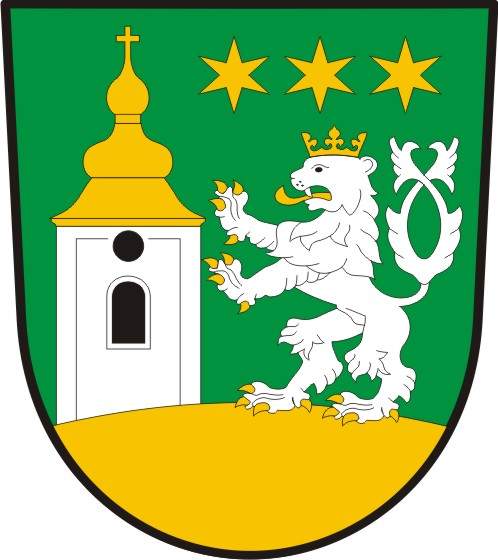
- Flag Coat of arms

- Location in the Czech Republic
- Coordinates: 50°27′5″N 15°54′18″E
- Country: Czech Republic
- Region: Hradec Králové
- District: Trutnov
- First mentioned: 1415

Area
  - Total: 10.80 km^{2} (4.17 sq mi)
- Elevation: 467 m (1,532 ft)

Population (2026-01-01)
  - Total: 310
  - Density: 29/km^{2} (74/sq mi)
- Time zone: UTC+1 (CET)
  - Summer (DST): UTC+2 (CEST)
- Postal code: 544 01
- Website: www.kohoutov.info

Kohoutov is a municipality and village in Trutnov District in the Hradec Králové Region of the Czech Republic. It has about 300 inhabitants.

== Demographics ==
Historical population
Year	Pop.	±%
1869	1,458	—
1880	1,392	−4.5%
1890	1,349	−3.1%
1900	1,201	−11.0%
1910	1,132	−5.7%
1921	1,019	−10.0%
1930	1,013	−0.6%
1950	412	−59.3%
1961	360	−12.6%
1970	297	−17.5%
1980	283	−4.7%
1991	228	−19.4%
2001	210	−7.9%
2011	267	+27.1%
2021	263	−1.5%
Source: Censuses
