= Ladislav Jindra =

Czech-born American World War II veteran (1921–2026)

Ladislav Jindra (June 1921 – April 30, 2026), also known as Leonard Jindra, was a Czech-born American World War II veteran.

== Life and career ==
Ladislav Jindra was born in June 1921 in Koňkovice near Světlá nad Sázavou. Due to the growing political tension in Europe during the 1930s, he traveled to New York in 1938 to live with relatives. He adopted the first name Leonard due to the difficult English pronunciation of his given first name.

Jindra attempted to enlist in the Army after the start of World War II, but was not accepted. He was accepted in his second attempt to join the Army in 1943, but had to sign a naturalization petition confirming a preliminary application for US citizenship. As a member of the 115th Infantry Regiment of the 29th Infantry Division, he participated in the Normandy invasion on June 6, 1944, at Omaha Beach.

He was wounded three times within a few weeks. His last injury was serious, and occurred in July 1944 during the liberation of the city of Saint-Lô. After a difficult operation and recovery, he only served in rear units for the remainder of the war. His decorations include several Purple Hearts, and the Bronze Star.

After the war, Jindra received American citizenship, and in 1948 he married Věra, whose parents had come from Bohemia to New York before World War I. He had a daughter, Diana, and a son, Lawrence, an ophthalmologist and eye surgeon, and a colonel in the U.S. Marine Corps. He lived in the states of New York and New Jersey, moving to the Floral Park borough on Long Island in 1951.

Jindra received the insignia of Chevalier of the French Legion of Honor from the French Reserve Officers Association. In 2014, the Czech Minister of Defense Martin Stropnický awarded him the Cross of Merit of the Minister of Defence of the Czech Republic.

Jindra died on April 30, 2026, at the age of 104.
