= Serhii Makhno =

Ukrainian architect, designer, and artist

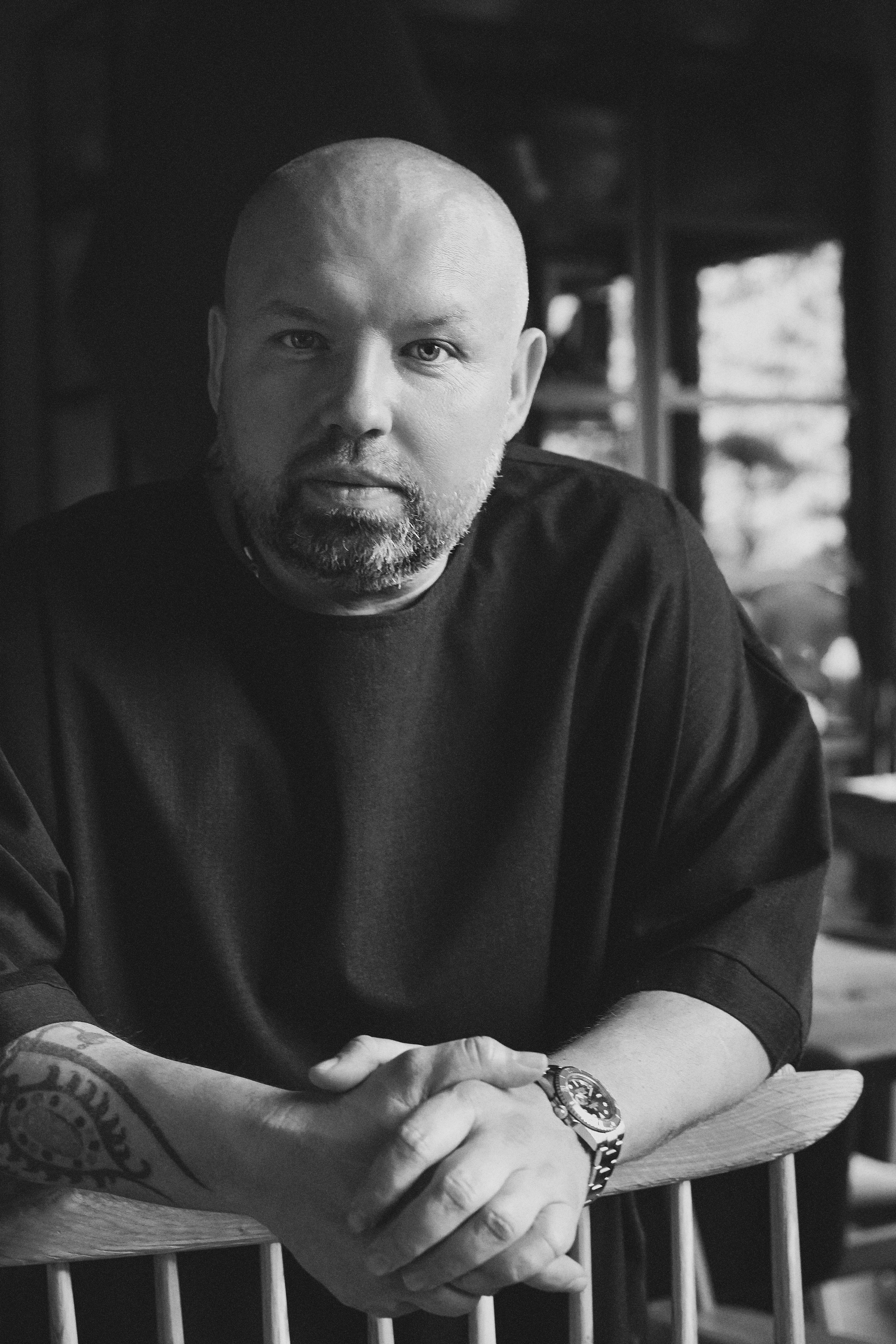
- Born: May 21, 1981 (age 45); Kyiv
- Education: Kyiv National University of Construction and Architecture, Ukraine
- Occupations: architect, designer, artist
- Website: https://makhnostudio.com/

Serhii Makhno (Ukrainian: Сергій Михайлович Махно) is a Ukrainian architect, designer, and artist. He is the founder of Makhno Studio.

His designs have been exhibited at Salone del Mobile in Milan, Paris Design Week, Dutch Design Week, Galerie 5 in Singapore, Gallery G-77 in Kyoto, and Les Ateliers Courbet Gallery in New York.

Serhii Makhno is a jury member of the Dezeen Awards, International Architecture & Design Awards, Architecture MasterPrize, and others.

== Career ==
After graduating in 2003, Serhii Makhno founded Makhno Studio, a multidisciplinary architecture, interior design, and product design firm.

=== Architecture & Design ===
The studio works in a style that combines Ukrainian authenticity, contemporary art, naturalness, and futurism.

One of the main principles of the studio is to combine classical elements with modern ideas, using traditional crafts and techniques, but in a new context.

During this time, Makhno Studio has won such global architectural awards as The Architecture MasterPrize, IIDA Awards, Restaurant & Bar Design Awards, SBID Awards, and others. In particular, the Shkrub project won several prestigious architectural awards simultaneously in 2020 and 2021.

=== Art ===
In addition to Makhno's architecture and design studio, he also runs a ceramics workshop. Across designs, Makhno’s work embodies the Japanese aesthetic and concept of wabi-sabi.

Serhii Makhno and his team create furniture, lighting, tiles, and decor. In 2017, he received the international Red Dot Design Award for his ceramic tiles, and in 2024 – for innovative blocks made of "live" clay. Also, in 2021, the Khmara ceramic lamp received the Grand Prix at the Big See Interior Design Awards and an award from the Interior Design Magazine Awards

In 2017, the studio presented the project "Transformation. Silence" at Paris Design Week and the same year at Dutch Design Week in Eindhoven, the Netherlands. In January 2019, the studio took part in Maison&Objet as part of the Ukrainian collective stand with the “Ukrsavana” project.

In 2019, Serhii and his studio presented the “Inside. Out” project at their 100-meter-long stand at iSaloni.Salone del Mobile.Milano. Euroluce. The composition of ceramic furniture and lamps was among the main trends of the exhibition according to ArchDaily

In 2020, the Makhno Art Foundation was created to launch a new wave of Ukrainian art.

In 2022, he released his first NFT collection of ceramic art, Meta Dido. Digital tokens reimagine a series of ceramic zoomorphic sculptures created and released in 2019 under "Dido".

In November 2023, Zemlya's handmade ceramic furniture and decor collection was exhibited at Les Ateliers Courbet in New York, USA.

In 2024, the studio's art objects became exhibits in the immersive theatrical show Wayne Enterprises Experience by Warner Bros. Discovery Global Consumer Products, DC, and Relevance International's Brand Experience & Partnerships, dedicated to the 35th anniversary of the Batman franchise. The recreated Bruce Wayne’s mansion featured items from the studio, specially created for this event.

== Exhibitions ==
- 2017 – Paris Design Week in Paris, France.
- 2017 – Dutch Design Week in Eindhoven, Netherlands.
- 2019 – Maison&Objet in Paris, France.
- 2019 – Salone del Mobile in Milan, Italy.
- 2021 – Expo 2020 Dubai in Dubai, UAE.
- 2023 – Gallery G-77 in Kyoto, Japan.
- 2023 – Les Ateliers Courbet in New York, USA.
- 2024 – Galerie 5, International Day of Light in Singapore.
- 2024 – Wayne Enterprises Experience in New York, USA.
