= Jindřiška =

Jindřiška is a Czech feminine given name, a Czech equivalent of the name Henrietta. The masculine form of the name is Jindřich. Notable people with the given name include:

- Jindřiška Flajšhansová (1868–1931), Czech teacher, editor and women's rights activist
- Jindřiška Holubková, Czech table tennis player
- Jindřiška "Jindra" Kramperová (1940–2024), Czech figure skater and pianist
