= FLICAM =

Ceramics museum in China

FuLe International Ceramic Art Museum (abbreviated FLICAM) is situated outside Xi'an in Shaanxi province, China. The museum consists of pavilions dedicated to individual countries or regions, exhibiting work by ceramic artists from each country created during a residency at the museum.

The first museum pavilions opened in 2005, for France and Scandinavia, followed in 2007 by museums for Australasia and North America. In 2008, ceramic artists are invited from Great Britain, the Netherlands and Belgium. In 2016, a pavilion for ceramists from Ukraine was opened.

FLICAM was conceived and is sponsored by Xu Dufeng, chairman of the Futo Industrial Group.

== See also ==
- Ceramics museum
