= International Academy of Ceramics =

International Academy of Ceramics (IAC)
- Académie Internationale de la Céramique
- Abbreviation: IAC / AIC
- Formation: 1952
- Founder: Henry J. Reynaud
- Founded at: Geneva, Switzerland
- Type: Professional association
- Purpose: Fostering fraternity and communication between professionals in the domain of ceramics in all countries.
- Professional title: Corporate body
- Location: Geneva, Switzerland
- Region served: world-wide
- Fields: Art
- Members: 831 individuals and 77 collectives (museums or other organizations) from 78 countries (2022)
- Official language: French, English
- President: Oriol Calvo Vergés
- Main organ: Council
- Staff: 3 (2025)
- Website: https://www.aic-iac.org

The International Academy of Ceramics (IAC) or Académie Internationale de la Céramique (AIC) is an international professional association of ceramic artists. It is based in Geneva and operates worldwide. Since 1958, the IAC has been affiliated with UNESCO, initially on a consultative basis and as an official partner in the cultural sector since 2001.

The IAC was founded in 1952 by Henry J. Reynaud with the purpose of fostering friendship and communication between ceramicists throughout the world. This is accomplished by, among other things, developing and endorsing all forms of international cooperation to promote ceramics and support production at the highest level of quality. The academy is the only organisation dedicated to the medium of clay that operates on an international level.

Every two years, the IAC organises an international conference for members and ceramic enthusiasts worldwide and issues an internal bulletin about its projects and activities. New members are also elected every two years. In 2022, the association had 831 individual and 77 collective members (musea and other organisations) in 78 countries. The Academy is presided by Oriol Calvo Vergés, Director of the Museu del Càntir d'Argentona, for the period covering 2024 - 2030.
