= Jindřich =

Jindřich is a Czech masculine given name, a Czech equivalent of the name Henry. The feminine form of the name is Jindřiška. Notable people with the name include:

== Arts and entertainment ==
- Jindřich Šimon Baar (1869–1925), Czech Catholic priest and writer
- Jindřich Bišický (1889–1949), Czech photographer
- Jindřich Feld (1925–2007), Czech composer
- Jindřich Honzl (1894–1953), Czech theatre theorist, film and theatre director
- Jindřich Hořejší (1886–1941), Czech poet and translator
- Henry Kulka, born Jindřich Kulka (1900–1971), Czech-New Zealand architect
- Jindřich Plachta (1899–1951), Czech actor
- Jindřich Pokorný (1927–2014), Czech translator
- Jindřich Prucha (1886–1914), Czech painter
- Josef Jindřich Šechtl (1877–1954), Czech photographer
- Jindřich Severa (1909–1980), Czech sculptor
- Jindřich Štreit (born 1946), Czech painter and pedagogue
- Jindřich Štyrský (1899–1942), Czech painter, poet and photographer
- Václav Jindřich Veit (1806–1864), Czech-Austrian composer
- Jindřich Veselý (1885–1939), Czech pedagogue and puppet theatre activist

== Sports ==
- Jindřich Balcar (1950–2013), Czech ski jumper
- Jindřich Chmela (1924–2010), Czech fencer
- Jindřich Dejmal (born 1948), Czech football manager
- Jindřich Fügner (1822–1865), Czech sports administrator
- Jindřich Jirsák (1885–1938), Czech athlete
- Jindřich Kotrla (born 1976), Czech ice hockey player
- Jindřich Krepindl (born 1948), Czech handball player
- Jindřich Maudr (1906–1990), Czech wrestler
- Jindřich Staněk (born 1996), Czech footballer
- Jindřich Svoboda (footballer) (born 1952), Czech footballer
- Jindřich Trpišovský (born 1976), Czech football manager
- Jindřich Zeman (born 1950), Czech luger

== Other ==
- Jindřich Bačkovský (1912–2000), Czech physicist
- Jindřich František Boblig of Edelstadt (1612–1698), Czech lawyer and inquisitor
- Jindřich Kabát (1953–2020), Czech psychologist, professor and politician
- Jindřich Kopeček (born 1940), Czech-American chemist
- Henry Kučera, born Jindřich Kučera (1925–2010), Czech-American linguist
- Jindřich z Lipé, Anglicised Henry of Lipá (?–1329), Czech nobleman
- Jindřich Petrlík (born 1961), Czech environmentalist
- Jindřich Rajchl (born 1976), Czech political activist
- Jindřich Suza (1890–1951), Czech botanist
- Jindřich Svoboda (aviator) (1917–1942), Czech military aviator
- Jindřich Matyáš Thurn (1567–1640), Czech nobleman, military leader and diplomat
- Jindřich Uher (1911–1985), Czech politician
- Jindřich Uzel (1868–1946), Czech naturalist and entomologist
- Jindřich Waldes (1876–1941), Czech industrialist and art collector
- Jindřich Wankel (1821–1897), Czech palaeontologist and archaeologist
- Jindřich Zdík (c. 1083 – 1150), Czech bishop and diplomat
- Jindřich Zelený (1922–1997), Czech philosopher and writer
