= List of World Heritage Sites in the Czech Republic =

Locations of World Heritage Sites in the Czech Republic. Green dots mark the spa towns of the Great Spa Towns of Europe.

The first UNESCO World Heritage Sites on the territory of the present Czech Republic were inscribed at the 16th Session of the World Heritage Committee, held in Santa Fe, United States in 1992, when the country was part of the Czech and Slovak Federative Republic (also known as Czechoslovakia). At this session, three sites were added: the Historic Centre of Prague, the Historic Centre of Český Krumlov and the Historic Centre of Telč.

With the dissolution of Czechoslovakia on 1 January 1993, the country was split into the Czech Republic and Slovakia. The Czech Republic officially adopted the convention on 26 March 1993, inheriting those three sites. As of 2023, there are 17 sites inscribed on the list and a further 14 on the tentative list. The most recent addition is Žatec and the Landscape of Saaz Hops, added in 2023.

The Erzgebirge/Krušnohoří Mining Region, the three spa towns in the Great Spa Towns of Europe site and the Jizera Mountains forest as an extension to the Ancient and Primeval Beech Forests of the Carpathians and Other Regions of Europe are transnational sites; the Erzgebirge/Krušnohoří Mining Region is shared with Germany, the Great Spa Towns are shared with six countries and the Ancient and Primeval Beech Forests are shared with 17 countries. The Beech Forests are the only natural site in the Czech Republic; the other sites are cultural.

== World Heritage Sites ==
UNESCO lists sites under ten criteria; each entry must meet at least one of the criteria. Criteria i through vi are cultural, and vii through x are natural.

* Transnational site

World Heritage Sites
Site	Image	Location	Year listed	UNESCO data	Description
Historic Centre of Prague	Look at the Charles Bridge and the castle across the river	Prague	1992	616bis; ii, iv, vi (cultural)	Prague, situated on the banks of the Vltava river, has been an important European city since the Middle Ages. During the reign of Charles IV, Holy Roman Emperor (1346–1378), several monuments were constructed in the Gothic style, including Prague Castle, St. Vitus Cathedral, and Charles Bridge. The University of Prague, one of the oldest universities in Europe, was founded in 1348, and made Prague one of the leading centres of learning. Průhonice Park, which lies outside of Prague, has been included in 2010 as a masterpiece of garden landscape architecture of worldwide importance. A minor boundary modification of the World Heritage Site took place in 2012.
Historic Centre of Český Krumlov	View of the old town and the castle from above	South Bohemian Region	1992	617; iv (cultural)	The town of Český Krumlov was built around the eponymous 13th century castle on a meander of the Vltava river. The castle was built in Gothic style, with later additions of Late Gothic, Renaissance and Baroque elements. The town preserves the street layout from the Middle Ages, while the house facades feature decorations in the Renaissance and Baroque styles. The town was not affected by the industrialisation in the 19th century.
Historic Centre of Telč	Telč panorama from across the river	Vysočina Region	1992	621; i, iv (cultural)	The town of Telč was likely founded in the mid-14th century as a planned settlement in an area that was previously covered by deep forests, in order to exert political and economic influence over the region. The centre of the town is dominated by a Renaissance castle that was built upon a Gothic precursor. The triangular market square is surrounded by Renaissance and Baroque burgher houses that are linked by a continuous arcade and exhibit a wide variety of facades.
Pilgrimage Church of St John of Nepomuk at Zelená Hora	View of the church with a cemetery in front	Vysočina Region	1994	690; iv (cultural)	The Pilgrimage Church of St John of Nepomuk was built between 1719 and 1727, following the canonization of the eponymous saint. It was designed by Jan Santini Aichel in a highly original style. From the architectural perspective, it combines Gothic and Baroque traditions. The church is built on a star-shaped plan and prominently features the number 5 in layout and proportions, the number symbolizing the five virtues of the saint.
Kutná Hora: Historical Town Centre with the Church of St Barbara and the Cathedral of Our Lady at Sedlec	Church of St Barbara, a large Gothic building, at night	Central Bohemian Region	1995	732; ii, iv (cultural)	In the late 13th century, rich silver deposits were discovered in the area, which led to the development and prosperity of Kutná Hora. In the 14th century, it became a royal city. The historic town centre preserves the Medieval ground plan. The two important buildings in the city are the Church of St Barbara, in the Gothic style, decorated with frescos depicting the life in the mining town, and the Cathedral of Our Lady at Sedlec, a former Cistercian monastery church that was renovated in the Baroque style in the 18th century.
Lednice–Valtice Cultural Landscape	Lednice castle in neo-Gothic style	South Moravian Region	1996	763; i, ii, iv (cultural)	The Lednice–Valtice estate is one of the largest artificial landscapes in Europe, covering 200 square kilometres (77 sq mi). The Dukes of Liechtenstein, who owned the property, transformed it into a cultural landscape between the 17th and 20th centuries. They constructed several country houses, manors, churches, and other buildings in Baroque and Neoclassical styles, as well as a network of avenues, scenic trails, and forest paths. Gardens and parks were influenced by the English landscape gardens.
Gardens and Castle at Kroměříž	Flower garden and a pavilion	Zlín Region	1998	860; ii, iv (cultural)	The Castle in Kroměříž was constructed in the 17th and 18th centuries in the early Baroque style and served as the residence of the archbishop of Olomouc. The Pleasure Garden (pictured), laid out in 1665–1675, is a rare example of a Baroque garden that has remained relatively intact. It influenced the development of other gardens in central Europe. The Castle Garden features buildings in Neoclassical and French Empire styles.
Holašovice Historical Village Reservation	Two village houses with painted facades	South Bohemian Region	1998	861; ii, iv (cultural)	Holašovice is a well-preserved example of a traditional village from central Europe. The farmsteads from the 18th and 19th centuries have facades with stucco decorations in a style that is known as South Bohemian Folk Baroque.
Litomyšl Castle	View of the castle, showing a richly decorated facade	Pardubice Region	1999	901; ii, iv (cultural)	The Litomyšl Castle was constructed as a country residence in the second half of the 16th century, in the Renaissance style. It is a four-winged, three-storeyed building, with one of the wings consisting of a two-storeyed arcaded gallery. The facade is decorated in the sgraffito technique. The interior is decorated in the Baroque style. A range of ancillary buildings is also preserved.
Holy Trinity Column in Olomouc	The Holy Trinity Column decorated with several sculptures	Olomouc Region	2000	859rev; i, iv (cultural)	The Holy Trinity Column was erected in the historic centre of the town of Olomouc in the early 18th century, in the regional style, called the Olomouc Baroque. It is a plague column, the largest of its kind in Europe, with the height of 35 metres (115 ft). It was designed by Václav Render and many of its sculptures, representing religious themes, are the works of Ondřej Zahner. The monument includes a small chapel at the base of the column.
Tugendhat Villa in Brno	Villa exterior with clean white surfaces	South Moravian Region	2001	1052; ii, iv (cultural)	The Tugendhat Villa was designed by the German architect Ludwig Mies van der Rohe in the 1920s for Grete and Frits Tugendhat, members of a rich industrial family from Brno. The villa is an example of the International Style of architecture. Mies van der Rohe also designed the furniture and the adjacent garden.
Jewish Quarter and St Procopius' Basilica in Třebíč	Jewish Quarter of Třebíč with St. Procopius Basilica in the background	Vysočina Region	2003	1078bis; ii, iii (cultural)	The town of Třebíč is located on the banks of the Jihlava river. St. Procopius Basilica was built in the early 13th century, originally as a part of a Benedictine monastery. The Jewish Quarter is a well-preserved example of a Jewish ghetto, dating to the Middle Ages. A typical building has a condominium structure, with workshops on the street level and the residential upper levels. The two phases of the Jewish cemetery date to the 15th and 19th centuries.
Erzgebirge/Krušnohoří Mining Region*	Front and back of a silver coin.	North Bohemia	2019	1478; ii, iii, iv (cultural)	The Ore Mountains span over south-eastern Germany and north-western Czech Republic. The region has been an important source of metals since the 12th century, including silver (especially in the 15th and 16th centuries), tin, cobalt, and also uranium in the late 19th and 20th centuries. The cultural landscape of the region was shaped by mining and smelting innovations.
Landscape for Breeding and Training of Ceremonial Carriage Horses at Kladruby nad Labem	Kladruber horses in front of the National Stud Farm in Kladruby.	Pardubice Region	2019	1589; iv, v (cultural)	The stud farm at Kladruby nad Labem was founded in 1579. It is located on the floodplain of the Labe river in the remnants of a riparian forest. The farm breeds the horses of the Kladruber breed that were used during the ceremonies at the Habsburg Court. The farm is an example of ferme ornée, a specialised decorative farm built using the principles of the French and English landscape architecture.
Ancient and Primeval Beech Forests of the Carpathians and Other Regions of Europe*	Jizera Mountains Beech Forest	Liberec Region	2021	1133quater; ix (natural)	Primeval Beech Forests of the Carpathians are used to study the spread of the beech tree (Fagus sylvatica) in the Northern Hemisphere across a variety of environments and the environment in the forest. The site was first listed in 2007 in Slovakia and Ukraine. It was extended in 2011, 2017, and 2021 to include forests in a total of 18 countries. In the Czech Republic, the forest in the Jizera Mountains was added in 2021.
The Great Spa Towns of Europe*	Maxim Gorky colonnade in Mariánské Lázně	Karlovy Vary Region	2021	1613; ii, iii, iv, vi (cultural)	The Great Spa Towns of Europe comprises 11 spa towns in seven European countries where mineral waters were used for healing and therapeutic purposes before the development of industrial medication in the 19th century. The towns of Karlovy Vary, Mariánské Lázně (pictured), and Františkovy Lázně are listed in the Czech Republic.
Žatec and the Landscape of Saaz Hops	Hops garden, surrounded by buildings	Ústí nad Labem Region	2023	1558rev; iii, iv, v (cultural)	Because of favourable weather conditions, the area around the town of Žatec has been used to cultivate hops since the Middle Ages. The hop industry expanded in the 19th century and brought prosperity to the town. Several related buildings date to this period, including the drying houses, packaging halls, and storage buildings, as well as residential houses.

== Tentative list ==
In addition to sites inscribed on the World Heritage List, member states can maintain a list of tentative sites that they may consider for nomination. Nominations for the World Heritage List are only accepted if the site was previously listed on the tentative list. As of 2025, the Czech Republic recorded 14 sites on its tentative list. The sites, along with the year they were included on the tentative list are:

Tentative Sites
Site	Image	Location	Year listed	UNESCO criteria	Description
Renaissance Houses at Slavonice	Houses with sgraffito facades	South Bohemian Region	2001	i, ii, iv (cultural)	The town of Slavonice was founded at the crossing of important trade routes and rose to prominence when the post office was established there in 1530. It declined from the 18th century on, which resulted in the preservation of burgher houses in Late Gothic and Renaissance styles with very little alteration. Several houses feature facade decorations in the sgraffito technique.
Fishpond Network in the Třeboň Basin	Fish pond at Rožmberk, look from above	South Bohemian Region	2001	i, ii, iii, iv, v (cultural)	Fish farming in the area around the town of Třeboň developed in the Middle Ages, after the House of Rožmberk acquired it in 1366. Several fish ponds were constructed, together with the adjacent infrastructure, such as canals and sluice gates. The largest of the ponds is the Rožmberk Pond.
Český ráj (Czech Paradise) Rock Cities	Hrubá Skála rock formations	several locations	2001	(natural)	Český ráj consists of several sites with rock formations of Cretaceous sandstones. Formations at Hrubá Skála are pictured.
Sites of Great Moravia: Slavonic Fortified Settlement at Mikulčice – Church of St. Margaret at Kopčany*	Ruins at Mikulčice Archaeopark	South Moravian Region	2001	iii, v (cultural)	Mikulčice was an important fortified settlement of the Slavonic state of Great Moravia in the Early Middle Ages. It was located in the area that now stretches across the borders of Slovakia and the Czech Republic. Foundations of churches, burial sites, and remains of the fortifications have been uncovered at the site. The Church of St. Margaret on the Slovak side dates to the 9th century and underwent renovations in the 13th and 16th centuries.
The Industrial Complexes at Ostrava	Industrial objects at Vítkovice	Moravian-Silesian Region	2001	i, iv, v (cultural)	This nomination comprises sites of technical heritage related to the anthracite-based production of iron. The industrial complex in Vítkovice includes coal mines, coking plants, and blast furnaces, and has been for decades one of the most important centres of coal mining and heavy industry in Europe. Industrial activities started in the 1830s, restructuring took place in the 1910s, and the mining operations were terminated in 1993.
The Fortress of Terezín	Little Fortres of Terezín from above	Ústí nad Labem Region	2001	i, ii, iv (cultural)	The Fortress of Terezin was constructed in the late 18th century, following the wars between Austria and Prussia. The fortification system consists of two bastion forts connected by entrenchments. During World War II, the Small Fortress served as a Gestapo prison and the Main Fortress as a Jewish Ghetto.
The Spa at Luhačovice	Jurkovič spa house and a fountain in front	Zlín Region	2001	i, ii, iii, iv (cultural)	The first spa-related activities at Luhačovice began in the late 18th century and grew over the 19th century. In the first third of the 20th century, several new buildings were constructed following the plans of the architect Dušan Jurkovič, mixing the folk architectural styles with Art Nouveau. A Constructivist Community Centre was built in the 1930s.
The Betlém Rock Sculptures near Kuks	Betlém Rock Sculptures depicting a Biblical scene. Fence and trees in the background.	Hradec Králové Region	2001	i, ii, iv (cultural)	This nomination covers the assembly of Baroque sculptures by Matthias Braun. They were commissioned by Franz Anton von Sporck, an art patron, in the early 18th century. The sculptures, named after Betlehem, are located around the hospital and spa complex near the village of Kuks. They are carved into the sandstone boulders and depict Biblical motives, such as the Nativity scene and the Adoration of the Magi. There are also several statues of saints.
Karlštejn Castle	Karlštejn Castle on the top of the hill, view from below	Central Bohemian Region	2001	i, ii, iv (cultural)	Karlštejn Castle was constructed in the mid-14th century for Charles IV, Holy Roman Emperor, at that time the King of Bohemia. The castle is built on a rocky ridge. The most prominent feature of the castle is the Great Tower that contains the Chapel of the Holy Cross. The chapel housed the Imperial Regalia and the Bohemian Crown Jewels until 1420. The castle saw several renovations in the following centuries, with the Great Tower being restored to the Gothic look in the 19th century.
Extension of the World Heritage Site "Historic Centre of Prague" with the important Monuments in its Vicinity	The Hvězda Hunting Lodge, a Renaissance villa surrounded by forest	Prague	2001	i, ii, iv (cultural)	This nomination proposes the inclusion of three monuments, constructed in different periods, to the existing World Heritage Site: the Modernist Villa Müller, the Břevnov Monastery, founded in the 10th century, and the Renaissance Hvězda Hunting Lodge with its game park (pictured).
Mountain-top Hotel and Television Transmitter Ještěd	Hotel and Television Transmitter Ještěd, view from above	Liberec Region	2007	i, ii, iv (cultural)	The hyperboloid structure that comprises a hotel and a television transmitter was designed by the Czech architect Karel Hubáček. It is located on the mountain top of Ještěd, at an elevation of 1,012 metres (3,320 ft). It was constructed from 1966 to 1973 using steel and reinforced concrete.
Old Wastewater Treatment Plant in Prague-Bubeneč	Front view of the plant with two red brick chimneys	Prague	2020	ii, iv (cultural)	The sewage plant in Prague is an example of technical heritage from the turn of the 20th century. It was designed by the civil engineer William Heerlein Lindley as a part of the Prague's modern sewerage system. It was constructed from 1901 to 1906 and became operational in the following year. It was operational until 1967, used for sludge management until the 1980s. It was later converted to a museum.
European Paper Mills (from the era of hand-made paper)*		Olomouc Region	2024	ii, iii, iv (cultural)	This transnational nomination comprises six 16th–18th century paper mills that show the importance of Europe in paper production. The Velké Losiny Paper Mill is nominated in the Czech Republic, which was previously an individual tentative site (2001–2024).
Punkevní Caves with the Macocha Abyss and Kateřinská Cave		South Moravian Region	2025	vii, viii (natural)	The Macocha Abyss is a deep sinkhole that supports different types of vegetation due to its microclimate. The cave system has an underground river and is protected as a subterranean wetland under the Ramsar convention. Kateřinská Cave (pictured) has numerous types of speleothems. It is both an archaeological and palaeontological site, with remains of cave animals, especially cave bears, and remains from human habitation, starting with the tools of the Magdalenian culture from the Upper Paleolithic.

== See also ==
- Tourism in the Czech Republic
