= Tourism in the Czech Republic =

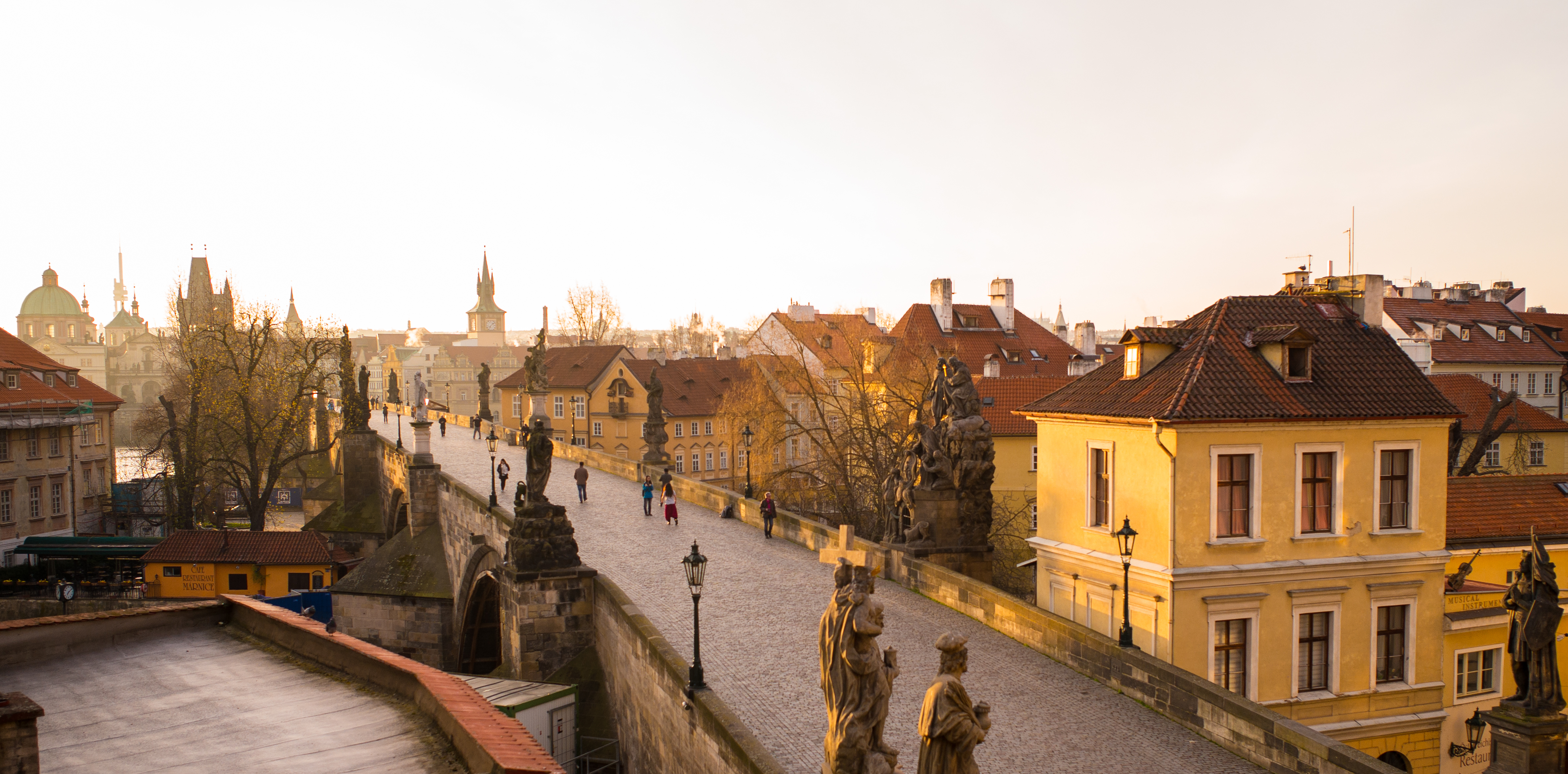
Charles Bridge in the historic centre of Prague

There is a long history of tourism in the Czech Republic. Prague is one of the most visited cities of the world, with 6–8 million visitors per year.

== Visitors ==
In 2019, before the COVID-19 pandemic, residents made up 50.5% of guests who spent at least one night in accommodation facilities (a total of 11,107,866 visitors). In 2024, the share of domestic guests was 54.0% (in absolute numbers 12,330,012 visitors, which was the second most in history). In 2022, the share of tourists from Asian countries decreased significantly due to long-term anti-pandemic measures in these countries, canceled direct flights and the political situation in the world. Most non-residents arriving to the Czech Republic and staying overnight are from the following countries (countries with at least 200,000 visitors per year):

Number of visitors (Note: Occupancy in collective tourist accommodation establishments) by country
Rank	Country	2024	2019
	Total	10,488,342	10,890,500
1	Germany	2,377,682	2,075,460
2	Slovakia	899,174	749,631
3	Poland	841,541	671,857
4	United States	562,578	584,627
5	United Kingdom	530,442	495,728
6	Italy	435,446	409,731
7	Austria	347,152	285,457
8	Ukraine	340,750	272,082
9	France	276,867	306,875
10	Spain	271,014	261,910
11	Netherlands	256,789	248,898
12	South Korea	255,424	387,563
	Mainland China	173,814	609,727
	Russia	40,764	564,083

Yearly foreign tourist arrivals in millions

=== Visitors by region ===
Prague is by far the most visited Czech city. In 2018, it was the 28th most visited city in the world.

Number of visitors in 2024 by regions
Region	Total	Non-residents	Residents
Czech Republic	22,818,354	10,488,342	12,330,012
Prague	8,079,195	6,506,081	1,573,114
Central Bohemian	1,362,921	292,591	1,070,330
South Bohemian	1,750,407	515,149	1,235,258
Plzeň	899,304	313,201	586,103
Karlovy Vary	1,390,692	754,421	636,271
Ústí nad Labem	634,283	210,121	424,162
Liberec	1,172,695	206,751	965,944
Hradec Králové	1,543,362	326,286	1,217,076
Pardubice	529,479	68,678	460,801
Vysočina	685,619	88,748	596,871
South Moravian	2,178,788	736,927	1,441,861
Olomouc	750,056	137,530	612,526
Zlín	817,876	116,263	701,613
Moravian-Silesian	1,023,677	215,595	808,082

== Tourist attractions ==
Petřín funicular was the second most visited tourist destination in 2024 with more than 1,505 thousand visitors. However, it was closed for renovation in 2025.

In 2025, the thirty most visited tourist destinations in the country (plus the most visited tourist destinations by remaining regions) were:

Rank	Destination	No. of visitors (in thousands)	Region
1	Prague Castle	2,733.8	Prague
2	Prague Zoo	1,449.2	Prague
3	Aquapalace Prague	1,198.2	Central Bohemian
4	Lower Vítkovice	1,045.5	Moravian-Silesian
5	Aqualand Moravia	886.1	South Moravian
6	Zlín-Lešná Zoo	812.2	Zlín
7	Ostrava Zoo	621.4	Moravian-Silesian
8	Jewish Museum in Prague	542.0	Prague
9	Adršpach-Teplice Rocks	512.2	Hradec Králové
10	Plzeň Zoo	491.6	Plzeň
11	iQ Park & iQ Landia science center in Liberec	485.5	Liberec
12	Pilsner Urquell Brewery	462.3	Plzeň
13	Petřín Lookout Tower	447.7	Prague
14	Old Town Hall	442.8	Prague
15	Prague Botanical Garden	422.0	Prague
16	Strahov Monastery	419.5	Prague
17	Brno Zoo	388.2	South Moravian
18	Olomouc Zoo	378.6	Olomouc
19	National Monument to the Heroes of the Heydrich Terror	366.0	Prague
20	Mirakulum amusement park	356.5	Central Bohemian
21	Jihlava Zoo	347.0	Vysočina
22	Chairlift in Prague Zoo	342.8	Prague
23	Sedlec area in Kutná Hora	338.7	Central Bohemian
24	Lednice Castle	328.5	South Moravian
25	Army Museum Žižkov	322.7	Prague
26	Aquapark in Uherské Hradiště	300.1	South Moravian
27	St. Barbara's Church, Kutná Hora	296.0	Central Bohemian
28	National Monument at Vítkov	290.4	Prague
29	Wallachian Open Air Museum	286.5	Zlín
30	Liberec Zoo	278.1	Liberec
34	Ohrada Zoo in Hluboká nad Vltavou	265.2	South Bohemian
39	Sky Bridge 721	230.0	Pardubice
42	Zoopark Chomutov	220.1	Ústí nad Labem
61	Loket Castle	168.2	Karlovy Vary

The Czech Republic has 17 UNESCO World Heritage Sites, including two transnational. One of them is natural, the rest is cultural.

== Tourist regions ==
For the needs of tourism, the Czech Republic is divided into 17 tourist regions, further divided into 40 subregions. The regions partly overlap with the administrative regions, but natural areas of tourist importance are set aside. The subregions further distinguish natural and cultural areas.

- Prague
  - Prague
- Středočeský kraj
  - Střední Čechy – west
  - Střední Čechy – south
  - Střední Čechy – northeast – Polabí
- Jižní Čechy
  - Jižní Čechy
- Šumava
  - Šumava
- Plzeňsko and Český les
  - Český les
  - Plzeňsko
- Západočeské lázně
  - Západočeské lázně
- Severozápadní Čechy
  - České středohoří and Žatecko
  - Krušné hory and Podkrušnohoří
  - České Švýcarsko
- Českolipsko and Jizerské hory
  - Českolipsko
  - Jizerské hory
- Český ráj
  - Český ráj
- Krkonoše and Podkrkonoší
  - Krkonoše and Podkrkonoší
- Královéhradecko
  - Kladské pomezí
  - Hradecko
  - Orlické hory and Podorlicko
- Východní Čechy
  - Pardubicko
  - Chrudimsko-Hlinecko
  - Králický Sněžník
  - Českomoravské pomezí
  - Orlické hory and Podorlicko
- Vysočina
  - Vysočina
- Jižní Morava
  - Znojemsko and Podyjí
  - Pálava and Lednicko-Valtický areál
  - Slovácko
  - Brno and surroundings
  - Moravský kras and surroundings
- Východní Morava
  - Kroměřížsko
  - Zlínsko and Luhačovicko
  - Valašsko
  - Slovácko
- Severní Morava and Slezsko
  - Beskydy – Valašsko
  - Těšínské Slezsko
  - Ostravsko
  - Poodří – Moravské Kravařsko
  - Opavské Slezsko
  - Jeseníky – east
- Střední Morava and Jeseníky
  - Střední Morava
  - Jeseníky – west
