= Veliny =

- Municipality
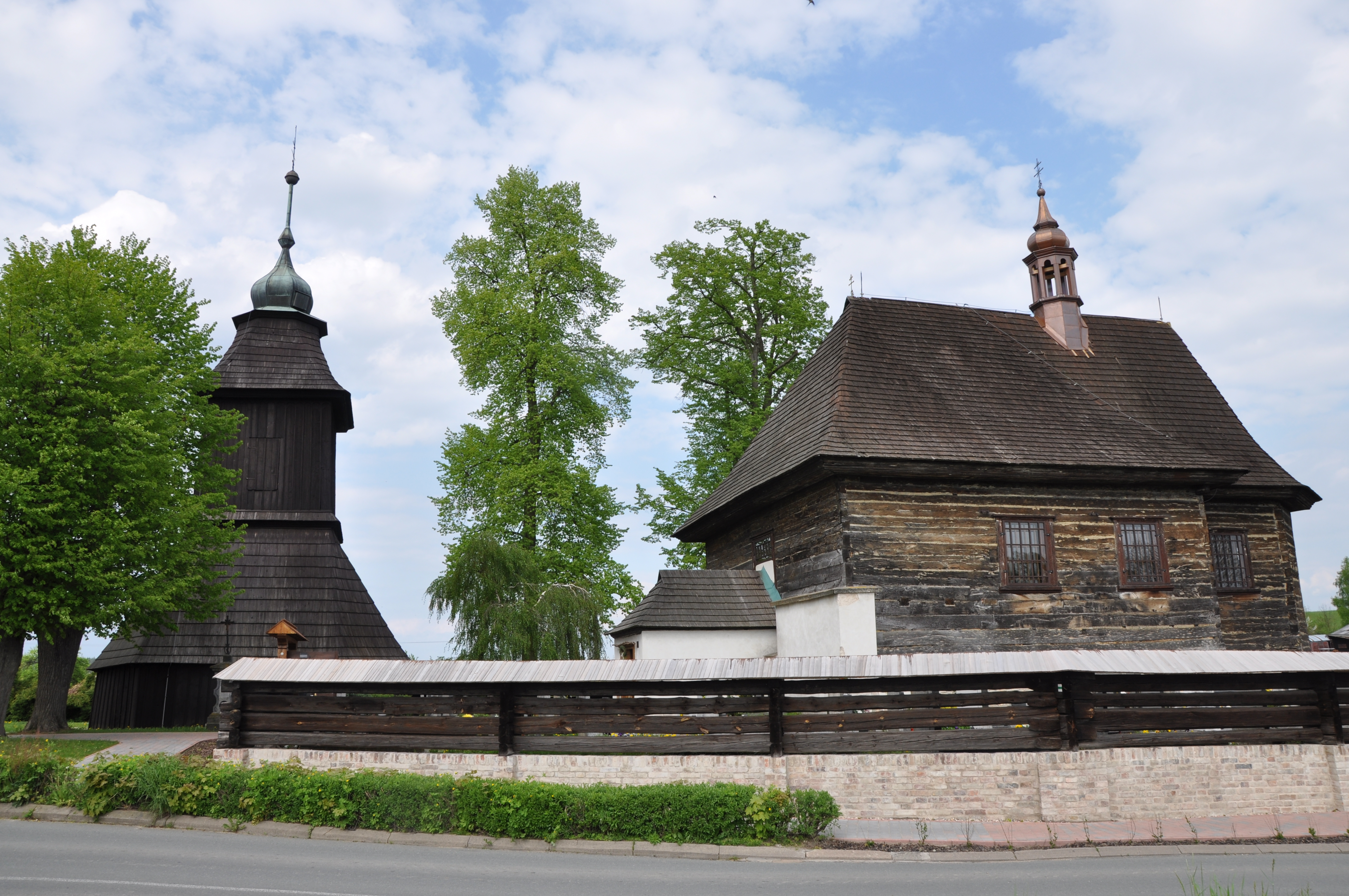
- Church of Saint Nicholas

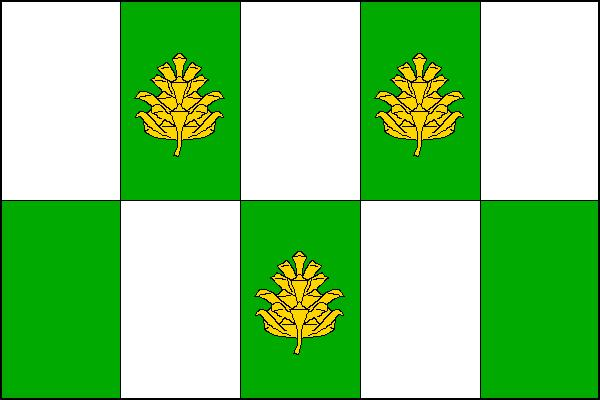
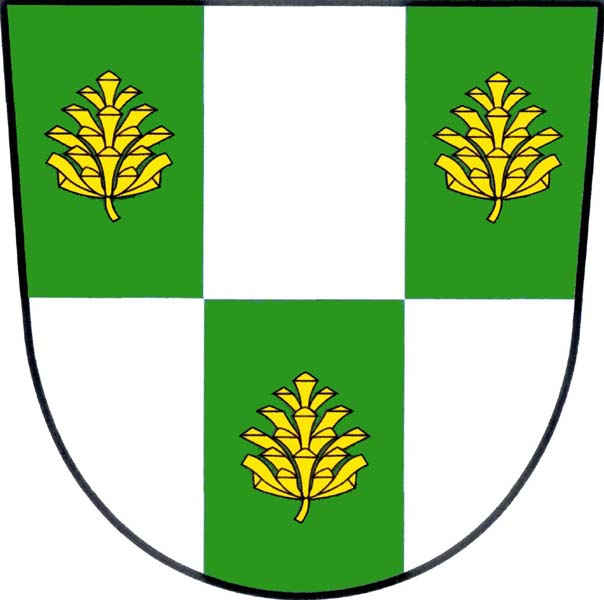
- Flag Coat of arms

- Location in the Czech Republic
- Coordinates: 50°4′16″N 16°3′14″E
- Country: Czech Republic
- Region: Pardubice
- District: Pardubice
- First mentioned: 1365

Area
  - Total: 6.52 km^{2} (2.52 sq mi)
- Elevation: 283 m (928 ft)

Population (2026-01-01)
  - Total: 496
  - Density: 76.1/km^{2} (197/sq mi)
- Time zone: UTC+1 (CET)
  - Summer (DST): UTC+2 (CEST)
- Postal code: 534 01
- Website: veliny.cz

Veliny is a municipality and village in Pardubice District in the Pardubice Region of the Czech Republic. It has about 500 inhabitants.

== Etymology ==
The name is derived from the personal name Vela, meaning "Vela's cottages".

== Geography ==
Veliny is located about 19 kilometres (12 mi) east of Pardubice. It lies in the Orlice Table. The highest point is at 334 m (1,096 ft) above sea level. The stream Velinský potok flows through the municipality and supplies here the fishpond Pilský rybník.

== History ==
The first written mention of Veliny is from 1365. From 1497 to 1560, it was owned by the Pernštejn family. In 1560, it was acquired by Emperor Ferdinand I.

== Demographics ==
Historical population

Year	Pop.	±%
1869	683	—
1880	655	−4.1%
1890	644	−1.7%
1900	616	−4.3%
1910	667	+8.3%

Year	Pop.	±%
1921	685	+2.7%
1930	680	−0.7%
1950	567	−16.6%
1961	590	+4.1%
1970	486	−17.6%

Year	Pop.	±%
1980	405	−16.7%
1991	356	−12.1%
2001	372	+4.5%
2011	424	+14.0%
2021	476	+12.3%

Source: Censuses

== Transport ==
The I/36 road from Pardubice to Čestlice runs through the municipality.

== Sights ==
The main historical landmark is the complex of the wooden timbered Church of Saint Nicholas with a morgue and a bell tower. The church was built in the late Baroque style in 1752 and the bell tower with morgue in 1750.
