= Wratislaus of Brno =

Duke of Moravia

Wratislaus, Duke of Moravia, part of Brno
- Born: 12th century Brno
- Died: August/September 1156; Brno
- Buried: St. Procopius Basilica in Třebíč
- Noble family: Přemyslid dynasty - cadet line Conradine
- Spouse: russian princess
- Father: Ulrich I, Duke of Brno
- Mother: unknown

Wratislaus of Brno (Czech: Vratislav Brněnský, German: Wratislaus von Brünn, Latin: Wratislaus Brunensis; died August/September 1156) was the Duke of Moravia from 1125 to 1129 and from 1130 to 1156. He was the first son and successor of Ulrich I, Duke of Brno (died 1092) and an unknown princess (probably of Slavic origin). He did not succeed as half monarch of Moravia (diarch), for all half of Moravia (the west one) as his father Ulrich I, but Brno was already divided into two parts (Brno and Znojmo) and his father Ulrich was co-monarch with his uncle Luitpold of Znojmo in this part. Both brothers together later established a Benedictine monastery and its St. Procopius Basilica in Třebíč and prepared as mausoleum for the Brno-Znojmo branch House of Přemyslid. Wratislaus himself probably initiated the establishment of the Royal cathedral chapter of St. Peter and Paul in Brno, formally created later in 1292. He reigned over Moravia (as diarch in Brno), once interrupted (1128–1130) by an illegitimate regency of Soběslav I). By his marriage in 1132 to a Russian princess, he probably had two or possibly three children:

- Spytihněv of Brno (or), Duke of Moravia from 1125 to 1129 and from 1130 to his death in 1146
- Svatopluk of Brno (?),(or) Prince of Jemnice (?)
- Agnes (?) 1197

He was succeeded legitimately as prince of Brno by his son Spitihněv of Brno (1146).

== Domestic policy ==
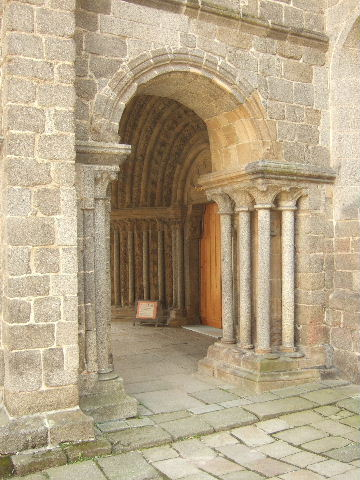
Burial place in Benedictine Abbey, Třebíč

Wratislaus initially ruled in the Brno part (the western one) of the duchy of Moravia, until 1129 when they were evicted illegitimately by Bretislaus II. Later (1130) they enforced a return of the Brno part of the Moravian duchy - according to the principles of agnatic seniority. After they returned to the duchy of Brno, the brothers divided it into two subparts named Brno (principality) and Znojmo (principality), where they continued to reign in certain local territorial union. In 1104 his father and uncle together founded a Benedictine abbey in Třebíč whose convent church of St. Procopius was intended as their own dynastic mausoleum where they were both buried.

Moravian lines of Přemysl dynasty as a whole were systematically associated with dynastic marriages with princesses of major royal and ducal dynasties, members of Brno line were associated Rurik dynasty, specially Wratislaus was 1132 spoused with princess of House of Rurik Members of the Moravian dynasty were fully predisposed to take over the central throne (for both countries - Bohemia and Moravia) in Prague, under the principles of agnatic seniority.

== Family tree ==
Conrad I, Duke of Bohemia d.1092		Wirpirk of Tengling d.	unknown d.		unknown d.
	Ulrich I, Duke of Brno d.1113			unknown princess d.

	unknown Russian princess d. ? OO ?	Wratislaus of Brno d. 1146 (1156 ?)
Spytihněv of Brno d.1199	Savtopluk of Brno d.1199

== Ancestry ==
Ancestors of Wratislaus of Brno

Boleslaus II of Bohemia
16. Oldřich of Bohemia
8. Bretislav I of Bohemia
17. Božena of Bohemia
4. Conrad I, Duke of Brno
10. Henry of Schweinfurt (Nordgau)
9. Judith of Schweinfurt
11. Gerberga of Henneberg
2. Ulrich I, Duke of Brno
Engelbert III. of Chiemgau
10. Sieghard VII. of Tengling
Adala of Bayern (and Kroatengau)
5. Wirpirk of Aribo
Friedrich I, of Adchens
11. Bilihild of Adchens
1. Wratislaus of Brno,
12.
6.
13.
3. unknown princess (Adelheid?)
14.
7.

== See also ==
- Moravia
- History of Moravia
- Margraviate of Moravia
- Lands of the Bohemian Crown
- Rotunda of Saint Catherine
- Conrad Otto of Znojmo

== Bibliography ==
- COSMAS, (Canonicus Pragensis); Chronica Boemorum. (Latin)
- COSMAS of Prague, (Canon of Prague). Translated by Lisa Wolverton (2009); Chronicle of the Czechs (Chronicle of Bohemias). Catholic University of America Press. (English)
- KRZEMIEŃSKA, Barbara; MERAHAUTOVÁ, Anežka; TŘEŠTÍK, Dušan (2000). Moravští Přemyslovci ve Znojemské rotundě. Praha: SetOut. 135 p. ISBN 80-86277-09-7. (in Czech)
- WOLVERTON, Lisa (2001).Hastening toward Prague. Philadelphia, University of Pennsylvania Press. ISBN 0-8122-3613-0 (English)
- REITINGER, Lukáš. Nekrologia kláštera Pegau. Pozapomenuté svědectví o Přemyslovcích (nejen) Kosmova věku. In: WIHODA, Martin; REITINGER, Lukáš (2010). Proměna středovýchodní Evropy raného a vrcholného středověku. Brno : Matice moravská, . ISBN 978-80-86488-69-1. p. 373-374 (in Czech)
- GROSMANNOVÁ, Dagmar (2010). Medieval Coinage in Moravia. In: GALUŠKA, Luděk; MITÁČEK, Jiří; NOVOTNÁ Lea. Treasures of Moravia. Brno: Moravian Museum Press. ISBN 978-80-7028-371-4. p. 371-374 (English)
- MOLECZ, P. (2003): Die Hanthaler-Fälschungen im Lilielnfelder Nekrolog am Beispiel der Schwestern des Heiligen Leopold. Eine Beitrag zur Barocken Wissenschaftsgeschichte und Babenbergergenealogie. MIÖG 111, p. 241-284, exact 360–365. (in German)
- WIHODA, Martin. Morava v době knížecí 906–1197. Praha : Nakladatelství Lidové noviny, 2010. 464 s. ISBN 978-80-7106-563-0.
- MĚCHUROVÁ, Zdeňka (2010). From the medieval history of Moravia. In: GALUŠKA, Luděk; MITÁČEK, Jiří; NOVOTNÁ Lea. Treasures of Moravia. Brno: Moravian Museum Press. ISBN 978-80-7028-371-4. p. 107-115 (English)
- WIHODA, Martin (2015). Vladislaus Henry: The Formation of Moravian Identity. BRILL. ISBN 978-9004303836.

Preceded by Ulrich I, Duke of Brno	Duke of Moravia, part of Brno; 1092	Succeeded by Spytihněv, Duke of Brno
