= Jewish Quarter of Třebíč =

UNESCO World Heritage Site
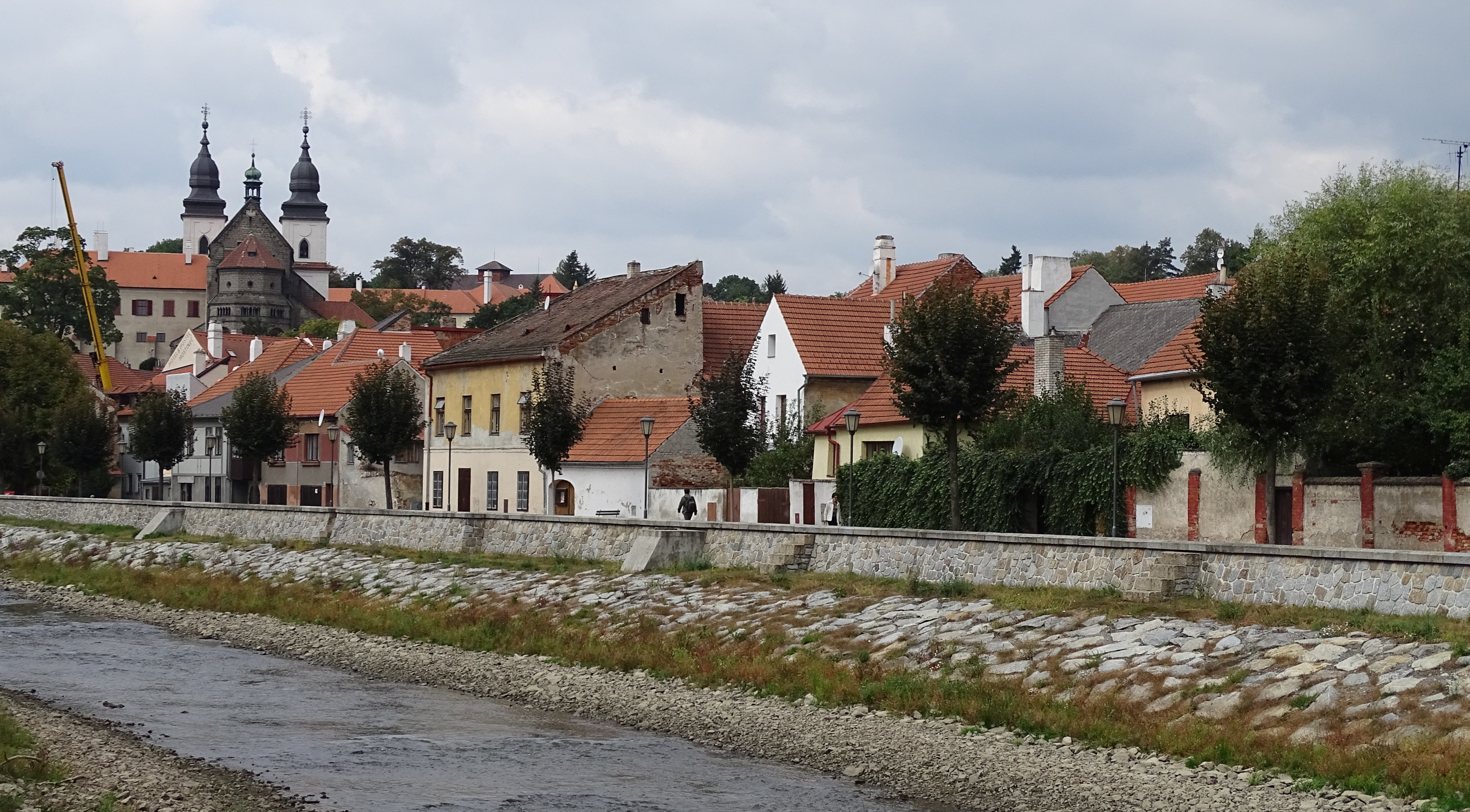
- The Jewish Quarter of Třebíč with the St. Procopius Basilica in the background

- Location within Czech Republic
- Location: Třebíč, Vysočina Region, Czech Republic
- Part of: Jewish Quarter and St Procopius' Basilica in Třebíč
- Includes: 1. Jewish Quarter; 2. Jewish Cemetery
- Criteria: Cultural: (ii), (iii)
- Reference: 1078
- Inscription: 2003 (27th Session)
- Area: 5.96 ha (14.7 acres)
- Coordinates: 49°13′02″N 15°52′44″E

The Jewish Quarter of Třebíč (Czech: Židovská čtvrť v Třebíči) is a neighborhood and former ghetto in the town of Třebíč, located in western Moravia, Czech Republic. The Jewish Quarter is situated on the north bank of the River Jihlava and is one of the best preserved Jewish quarters in Europe. In 2003, together with the nearby Jewish Cemetery and the St. Procopius Basilica in Třebíč, the Jewish Quarter was inscribed on the UNESCO World Heritage List, because of its testimony to the exchange of cultures and values in the region. As of 2013, it was the only Jewish monument outside Israel on the World Heritage List.

== Description ==
The Jewish Quarter is surrounded by rocks and the river, containing 123 houses and two synagogues. Above the Quarter on a hill is the Jewish cemetery, holding roughly 4,000 gravestones. The cemetery has two sections: one dating from the 15th century, and the other from the 19th century. The residential buildings in the quarter are generally condominium-style, with several (sometimes up to 16) owners of a subdivided house. However, the architecture in the quarter varies widely (even across different aspects of the same house), demonstrating the continuous use of the quarter for centuries.

== History ==
The oldest mention of a synagogue in Třebíč is from 1590, although many of gravestones in the cemetery are much older. In the 16th century, orders were given to expel all Jews from the town, although they were not carried out. The older of the two synagogues still standing dates to the mid-1600s. Unusually for Europe at the time, the Jewish Quarter had its own self-government with an elected magistrate and councilors beginning in the Renaissance. In 1894, the town had a mayor and was called Zamosti (meaning 'over the bridge').

All original Jewish inhabitants (in 1890 there lived nearly 1,500 Jews, but in the 1930s only 300 of them were of Jewish faith) were deported and murdered in concentration camps by Nazis during World War II. Only ten of them came back after the war. Therefore, many buildings of the Jewish town (e. g. the town hall, rabbi's office, hospital, poorhouse or school) do not serve their original purpose any more and the houses are now owned by people of non-Jewish faith.

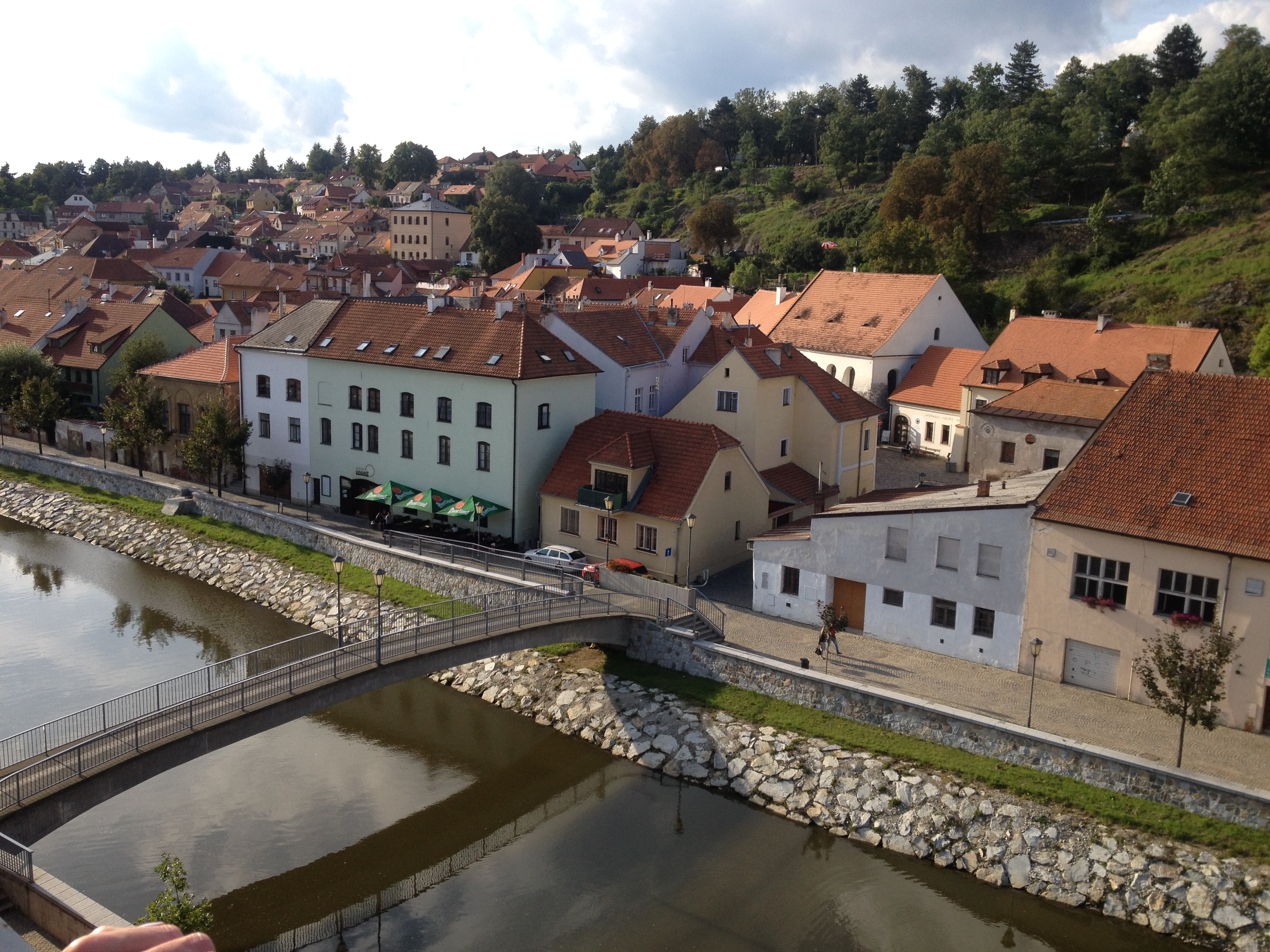
Jewish Quarter of Třebíč

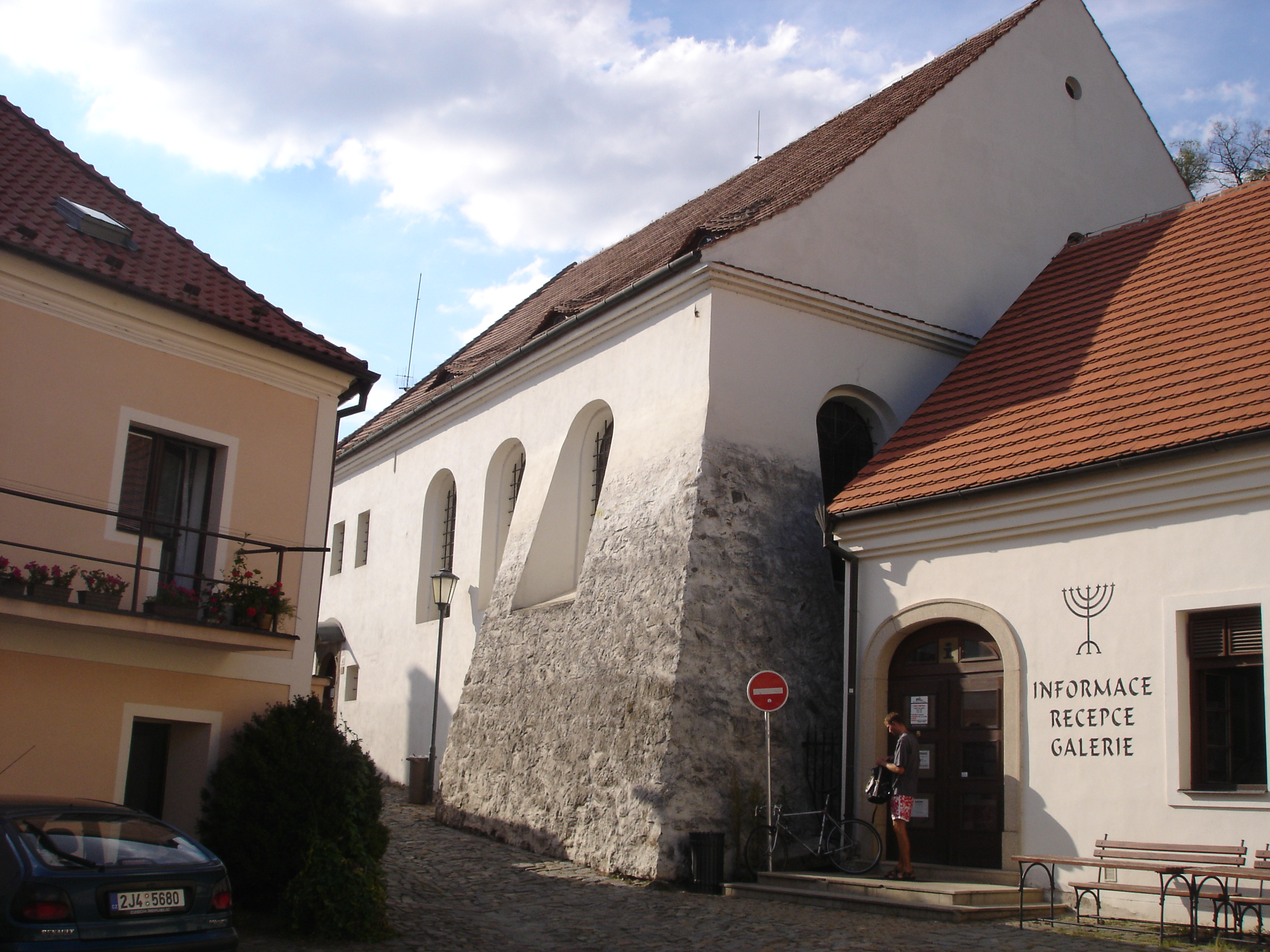
New Synagogue (Rear)

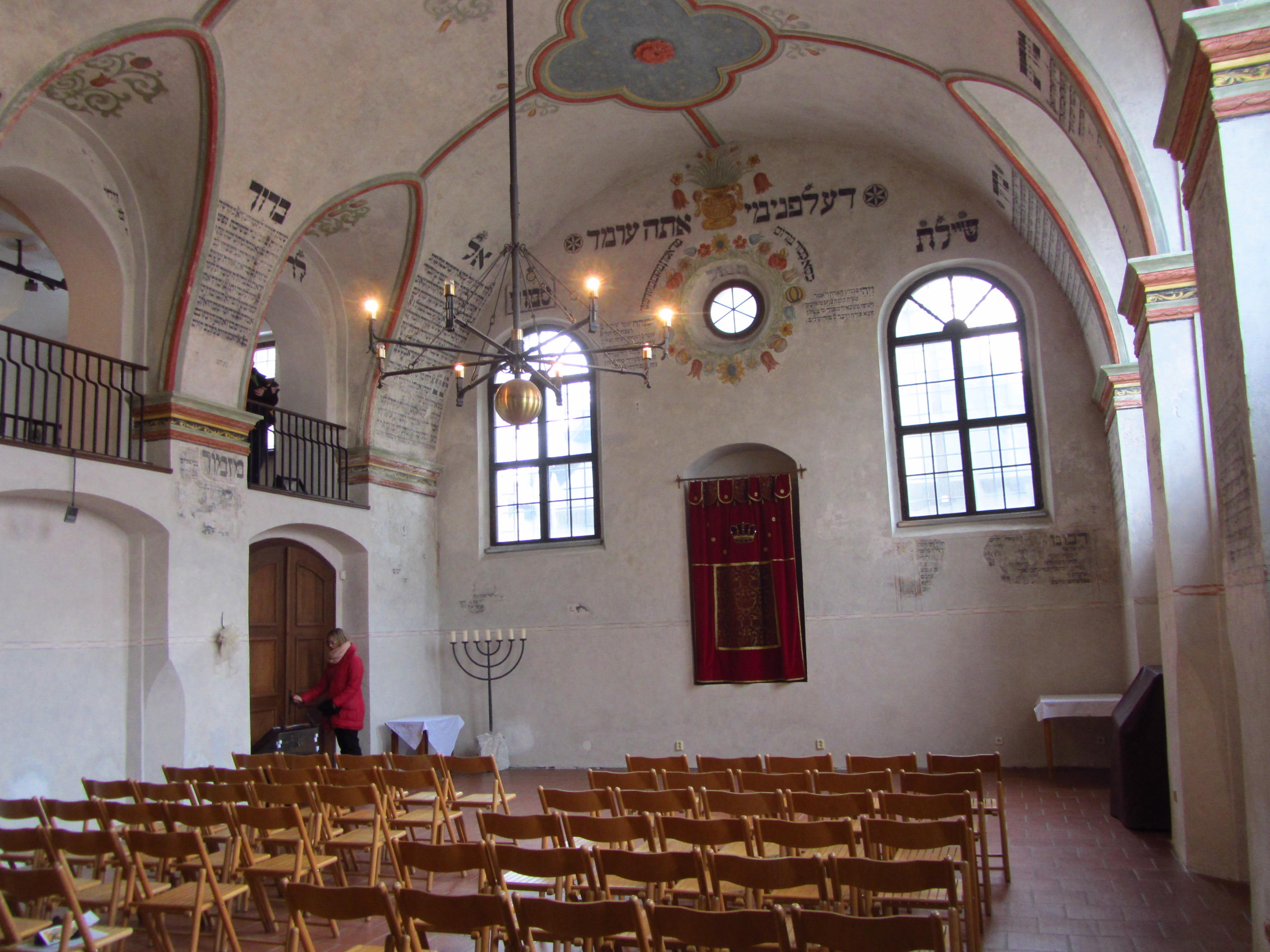
Interior of Jewish Synagogue

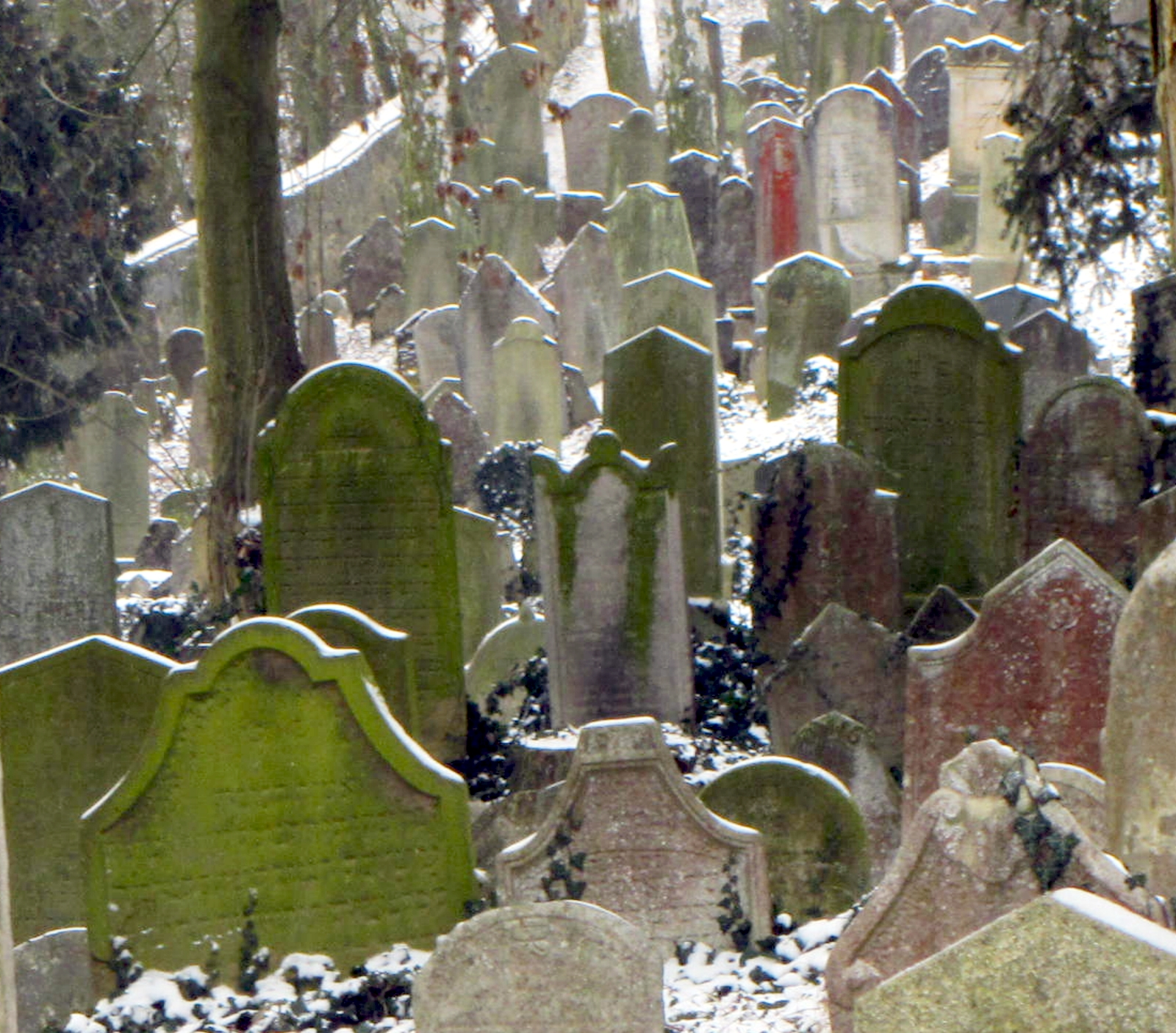
Jewish Cemetery
