= List of botanical gardens in the Czech Republic =

Some botanical gardens in the Czech Republic have collections consisting entirely of Czech Republic native and endemic species; most have a collection that include plants from around the world. Czech Republic botanical gardens and arboreta are administered by local governments, some are privately owned.

== List of botanical gardens ==
- Brno
  - Botanical gardens and arboretum of Mendel University of Agriculture and Forestry in Brno
  - Botanical gardens of the Faculty of Natural Sciences of Masaryk University
- Hradec Králové, Botanical gardens of medicinal plants of the Pharmaceutical Faculty of Charles University
- Kostelec nad Černými lesy, Arboretum of the Czech Agricultural University in Prague
- Liberec, Liberec botanical gardens
- Olomouc
  - Palacký University of Olomouc Botanical gardens
  - Olomouc Exhibition Centre of Flora
- Ostrava, Botanical gardens of the Faculty of Natural Sciences of Ostrava University
- Plzeň
  - Plzeň zoological and botanical gardens
  - Sofronka Arboretum of the Forestry and Game Management Research Institute (VÚLHM)
- Prague
  - Praha 2, Na Slupi, Botanical gardens of the Faculty of Natural Sciences of Charles University
  - Praha 8, Troja, Botanical gardens of the City of Prague
  - Praha 9, Malešice botanical gardens
- Průhonice
  - Botanical department of the Czech Academy of Sciences
  - Dendrological gardens of the Silva Tarouca Research Institute for Landscape and Ornamental Horticulture
- Rakovník, Botanical gardens of the Rakovník College of Agriculture
- Tábor, Botanical gardens of the Tabor Higher Specialist School and College of Agriculture
- Teplice, Botanical gardens of the City of Teplice
