= Lower Vítkovice =

Industrial heritage site in the Czech Republic

Coordinates: 49.820°N 18.280°E

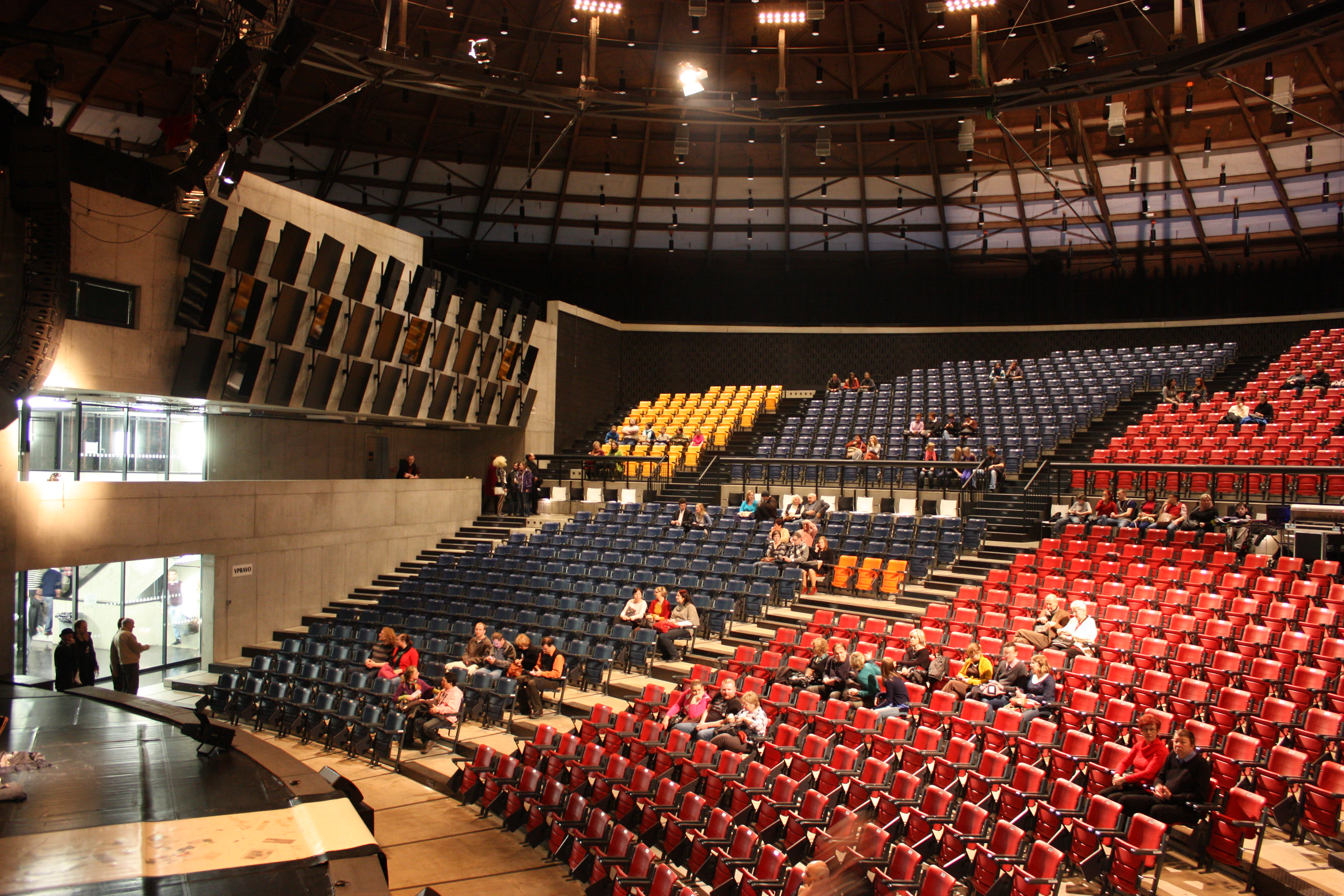
Great hall 'Gong' from bypast gasholder

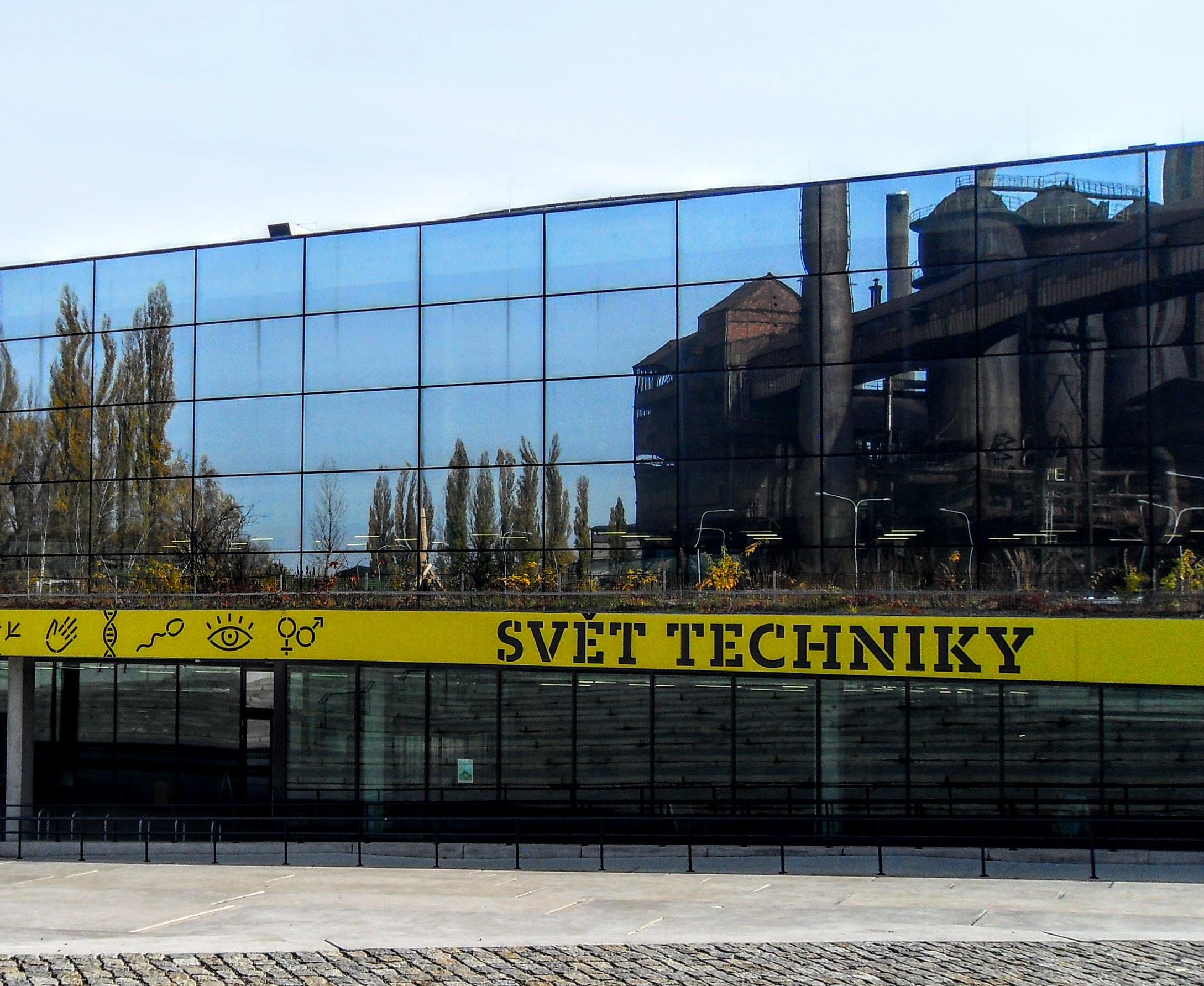
'World of technic', one of expositions in Nether district Vítkovice

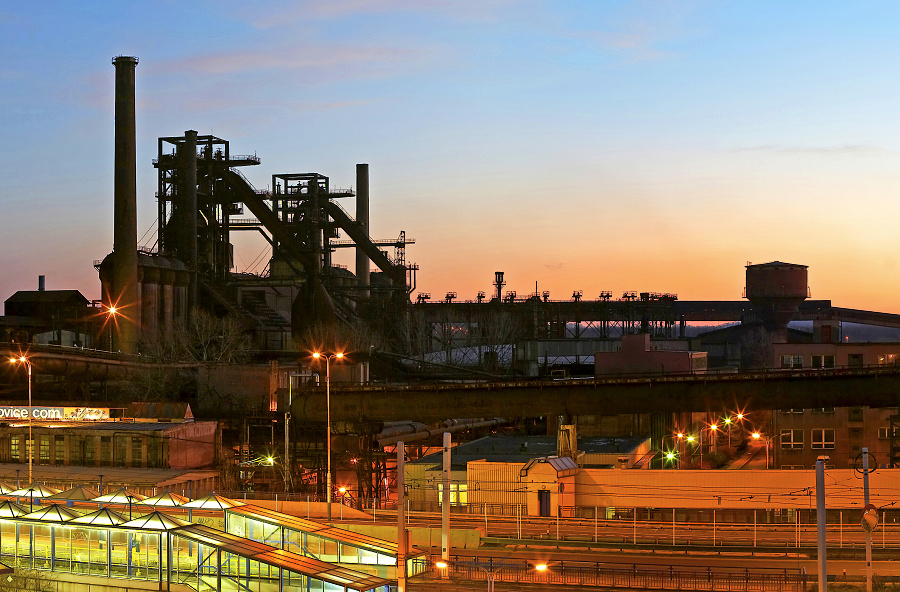
Daylight in Dolní oblast Vítkovice

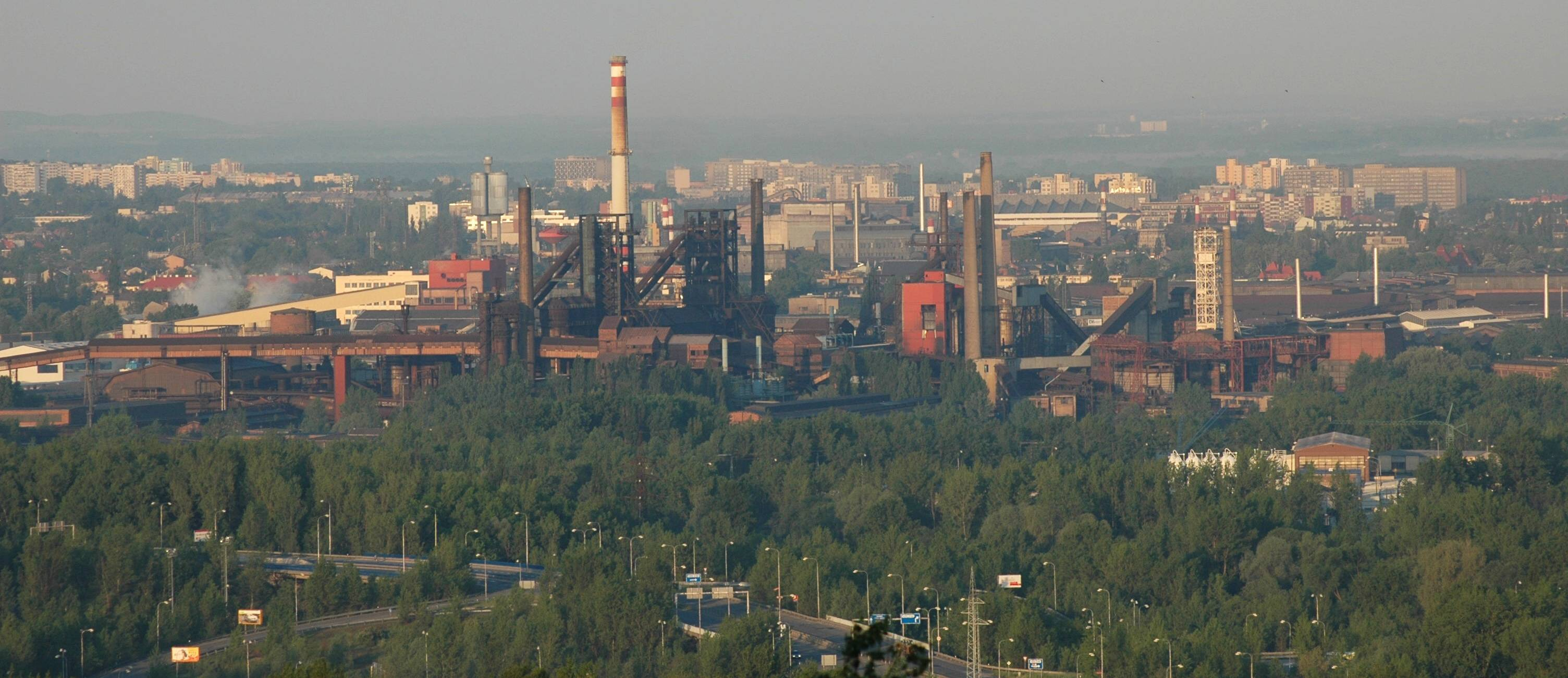
Northern part of Dolní oblast in past

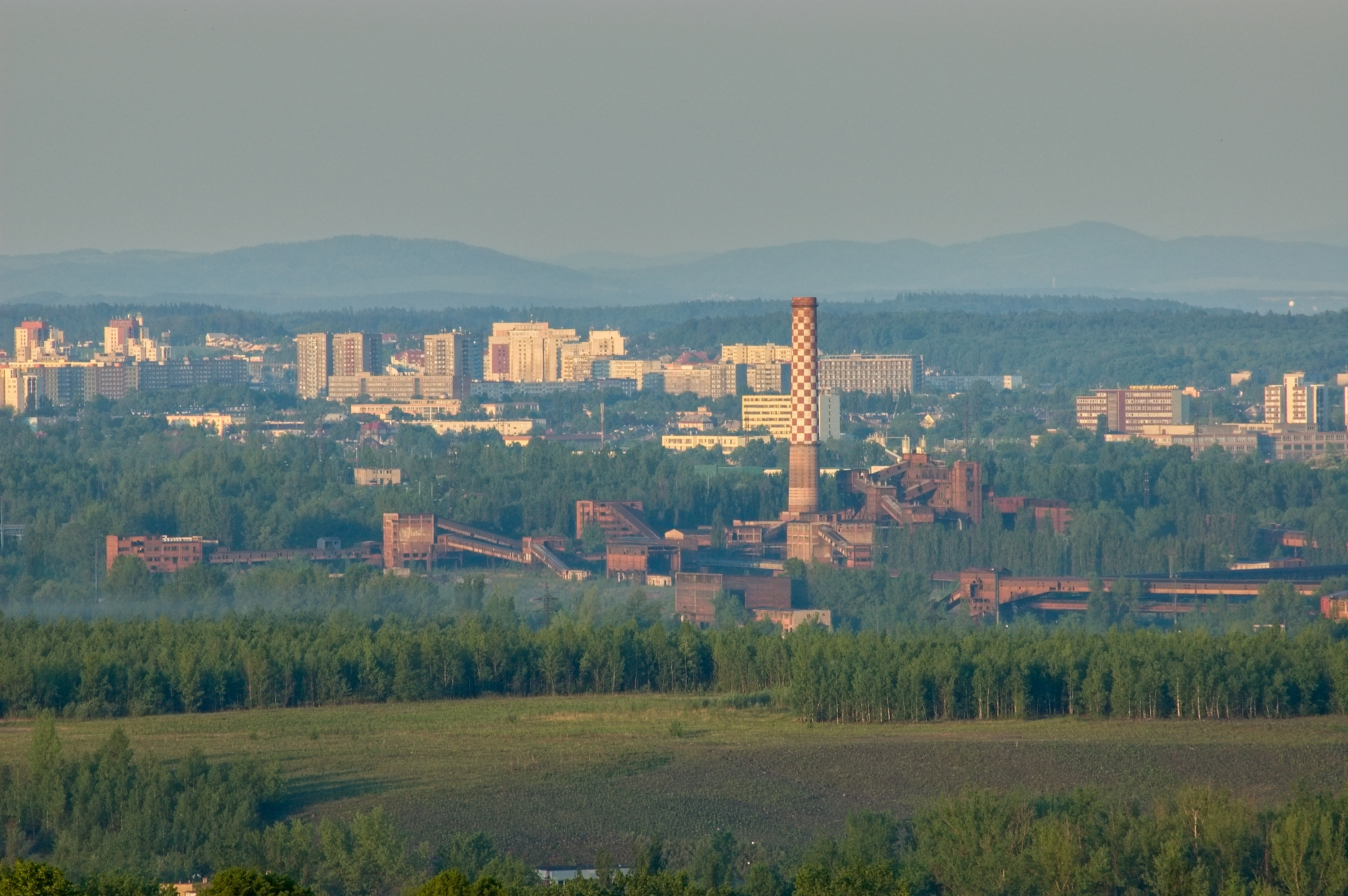
South part of Dolní oblast in past

Lower Vítkovice (Czech: Dolní oblast Vítkovice) is a national site of industrial heritage located in the Vítkovice district of Ostrava in the Czech Republic. It includes an extensive industrial area Vítkovice ironworks with a unique collection of industrial architecture. A set of three successive parts - coal mine, coke ovens and blast furnace operations - also called Ostravian Hradčany, after Hradčany, the Castle District of Prague. The area is registered in the list of European cultural heritage, and was placed on the Czech Republic's list of tentative UNESCO World Heritage Sites in 2001 under the name The Industrial Complexes at Ostrava.

== History ==
The initial impetus for the establishment of the Vítkovice ironworks came Dec. 9, 1828 by Olomouc Archbishop Rudolf. Rudolph's Smelter operation was then launched in mid-September 1830. A year later there was a coke plant. The first blast furnace coke was ignited in 1836, the second two years later. In 1852, it was near the smelter based mine depths. As time was running six blast furnaces which were gradually shut down until September 27, 1998, when the last tapping.

== Present ==
After termination of iron production was discussed what to do with the former industrial complex. At first they wanted to destroy it, but it was rebuilt as a technical monument for future generations. In June 2002 government declared Nether Vítkovice area as a national sight. In December 2008, then as one of four Czech sites given to emerging European cultural heritage site.

In September 2009 the project was awarded to the recovery and reuse of blast furnaces and other protected buildings half billion Czech crowns subsidy from the European Union and the Czech Republic. The main objective of the project "Bringing a new use to Nether Vítkovice" reactivation of the main parts of a national cultural sight Vítkovice, making them accessible to the public and the subsequent use of the potential of NCS for educational, cultural and social activities. In 2012 was completed the first part of the project and made available to the three basic objects of national cultural sights, blast furnace no. 1, gas tank and building VI. Energy exchanges.
