= Aquapalace Prague =

Water park in the Czech Republic

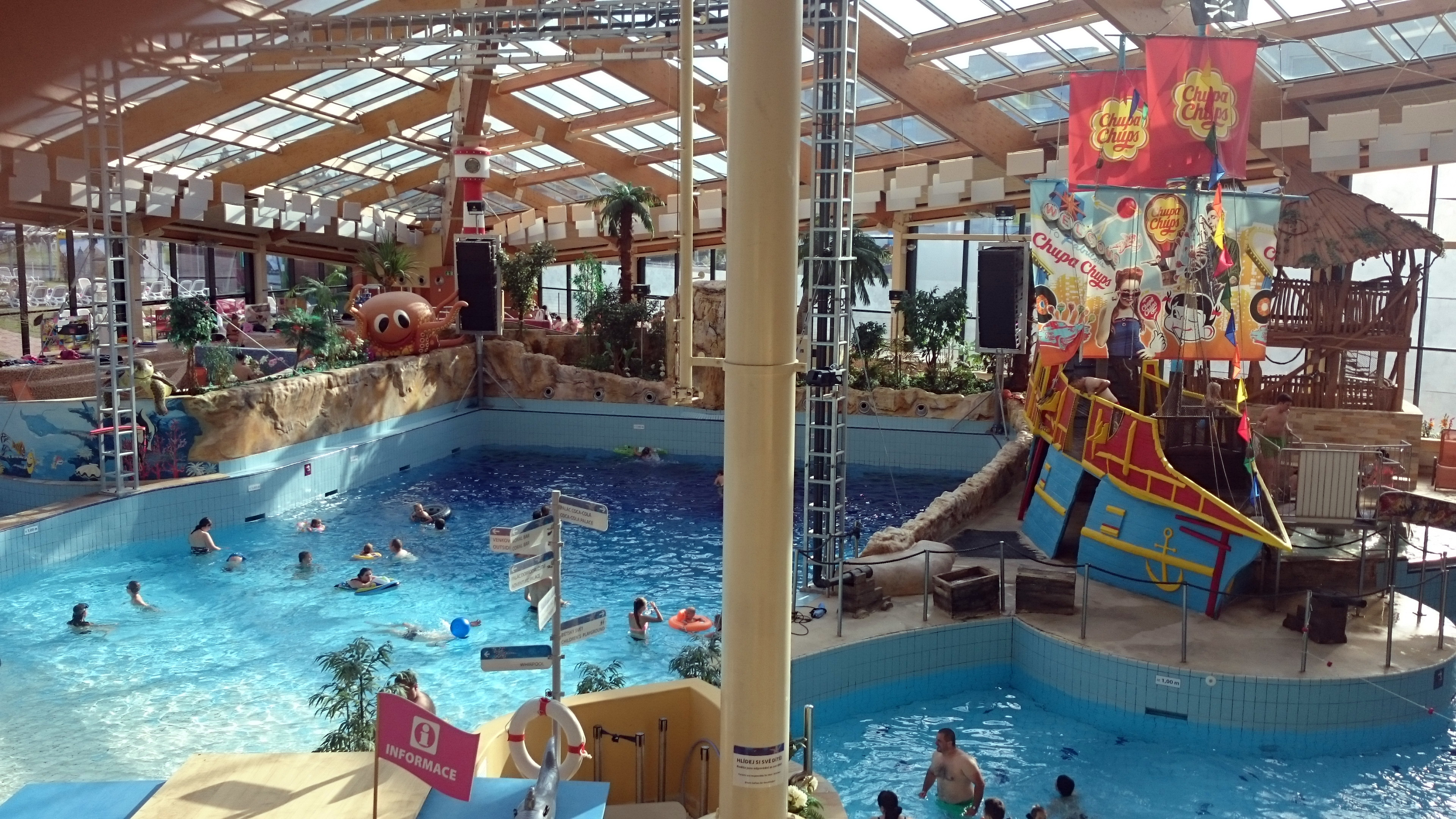
- Palace of Treasures in the park
- Interactive map of Aquapalace Prague
- Location: Čestlice, Prague-East District, Czech Republic
- Coordinates: 50°00′27″N 14°34′16″E
- Opened: May 5, 2008
- Status: Operating
- Area: 10,900 m^{2}
- Water slides: 12 water slides
- Website: https://www.aquapalace.cz/?lang=en

Aquapalace Prague (Czech: Aquapalace Praha) is the largest water park in the Czech Republic. It is located in Čestlice, about 100 metres (330 ft) from the Prague city limits. The park opened on May 5, 2008. It has both indoor and outdoor areas, which are connected. The main water park covers an area of 9,150 square metres (98,500 sq ft), and is made up of three themed "palaces": Palace of Treasures, Palace of Adventure and Palace of Relaxation; the "Sauna World" section of the park covers another 1,750 square metres (18,800 sq ft).

Aquapalace contains twelve water slides up to 250 metres long (the longest in the country), many pools, 450-m long lazy river, themed areas, artificial waves, Jacuzzis, a diving cliff, a bar, and a wellness, fitness and physiotherapy center. There is also a four-star hotel serving the park.

== Gallery ==
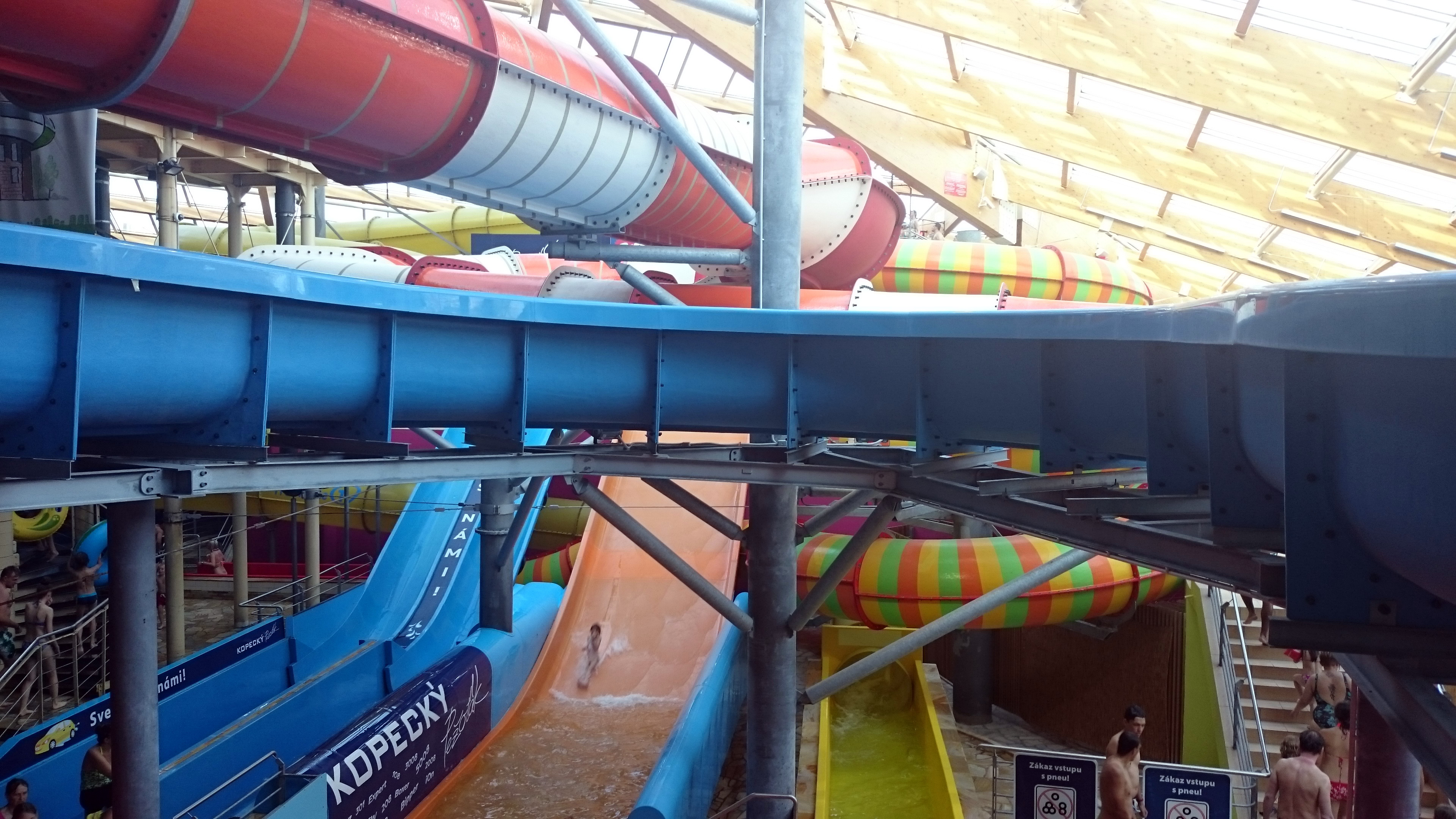
Palace of Adventures in the park

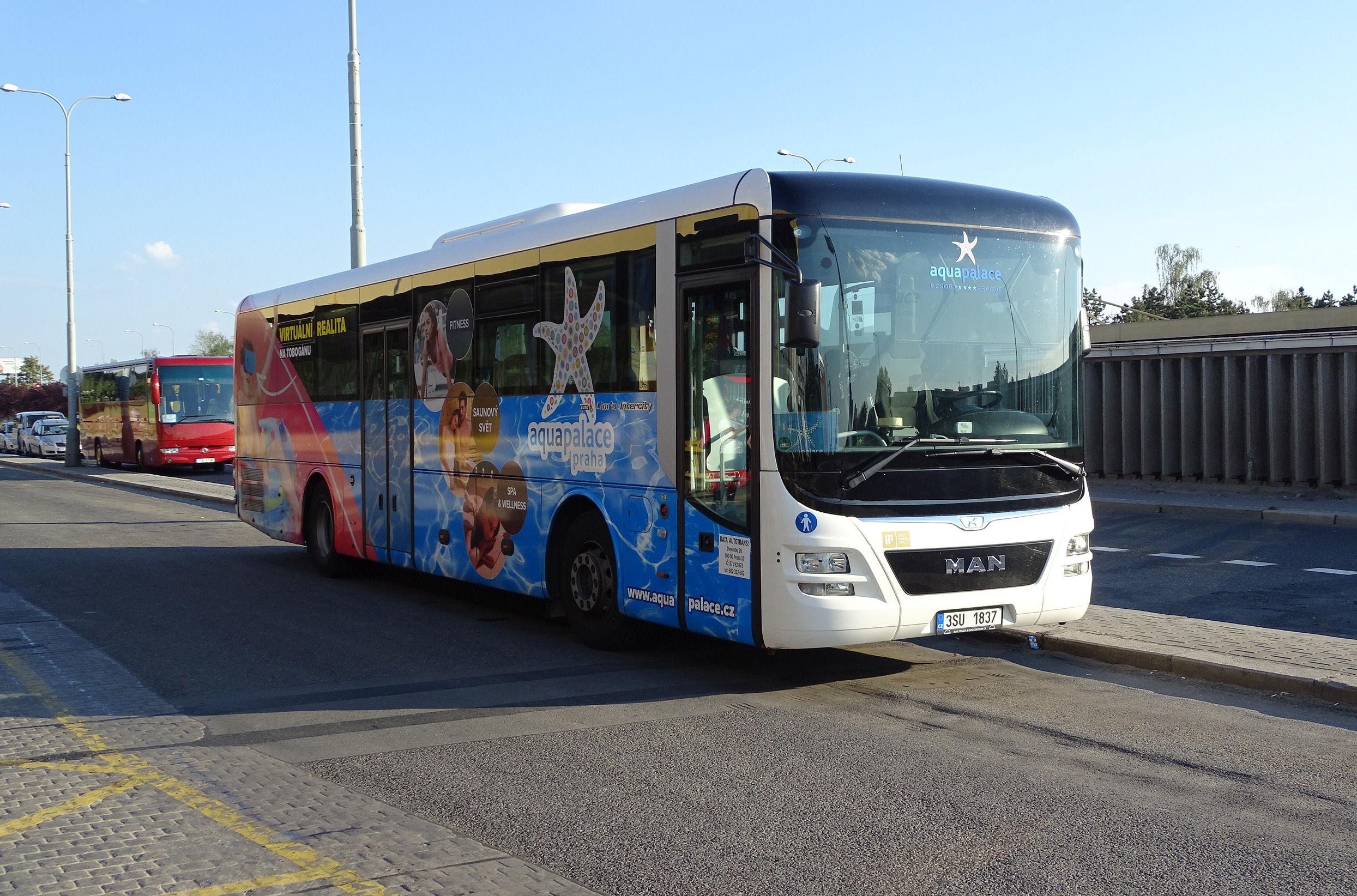
Aquabus from Opatov metro station

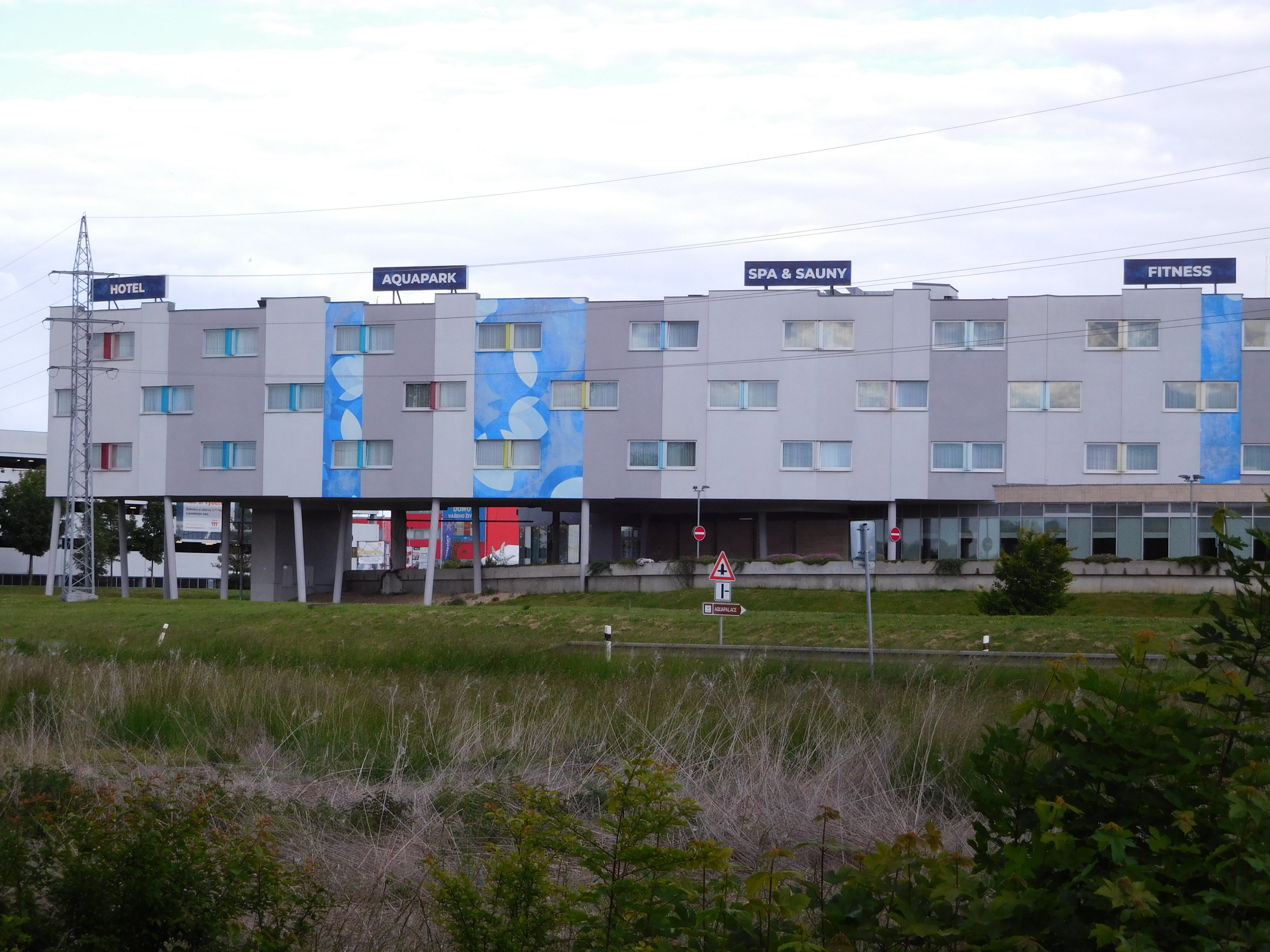
Four-star Aquapalace Hotel
