= Jewish Quarter and St Procopius' Basilica in Třebíč =

World Heritage Site in the Czech Republic

UNESCO World Heritage Site
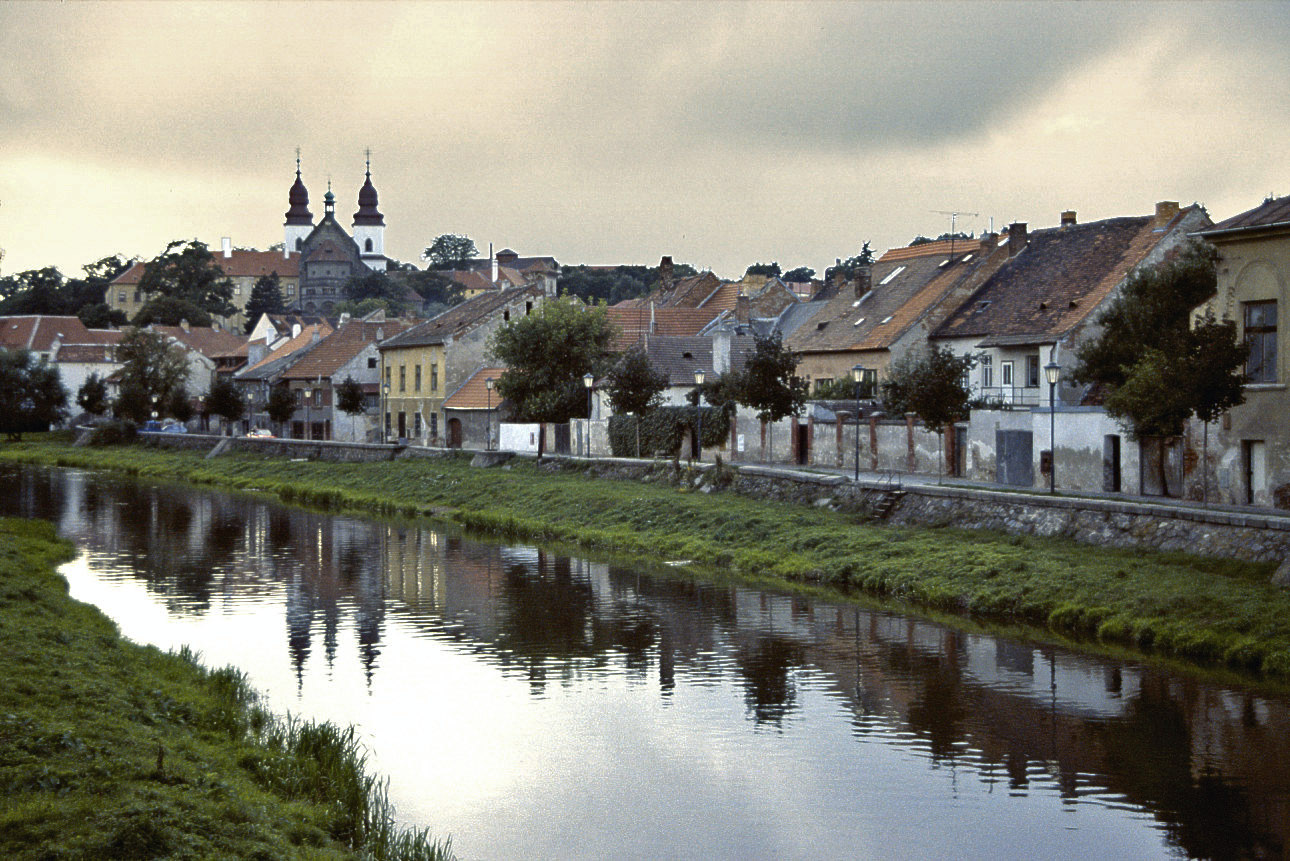
- Jewish Quarter of Třebíč with St. Procopius Basilica in the background.

- Location within Czech Republic
- Location: Třebíč, Vysočina Region, Czech Republic
- Includes: 1. Jewish Quarter; 2. Jewish Cemetery; 3. St Procopius' Basilica
- Criteria: Cultural: (ii), (iii)
- Reference: 1078
- Inscription: 2003 (27th Session)
- Area: 5.73 ha (14.2 acres)
- Buffer zone: 143 ha (350 acres)
- Coordinates: 49°13′2″N 15°52′44″E

Jewish Quarter and St Procopius' Basilica in Třebíč (Czech: Židovská čtvrť a bazilika sv. Prokopa v Třebíči) is the official name of the UNESCO World Heritage site in Třebíč, Czech Republic.

It consists of:

- the Jewish Quarter of Třebíč
- and the St. Procopius Basilica in Třebíč
