= Čestlice =

- Municipality
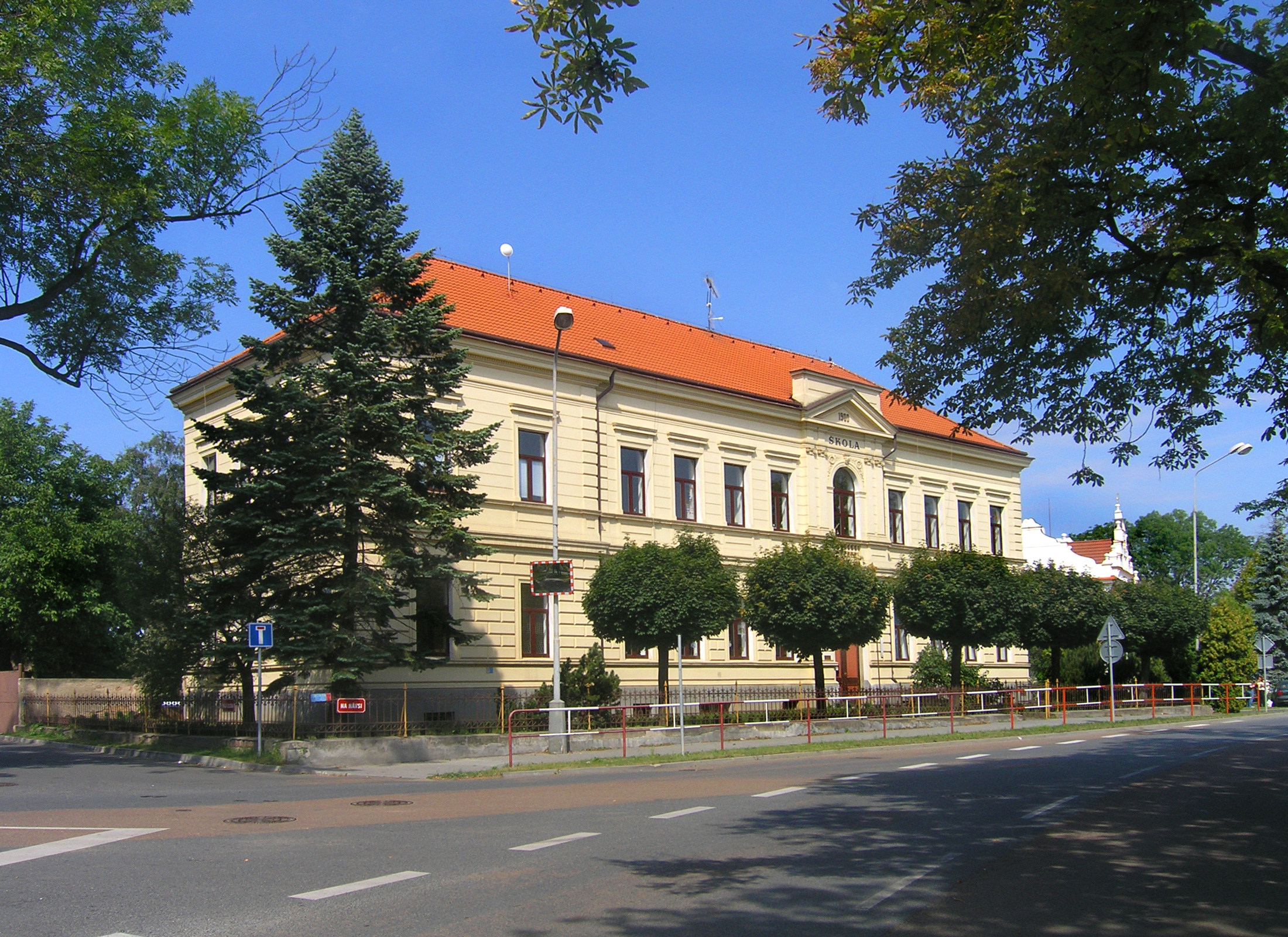
- Primary school

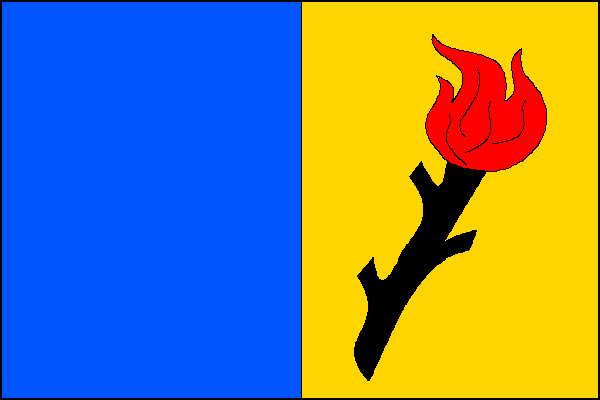
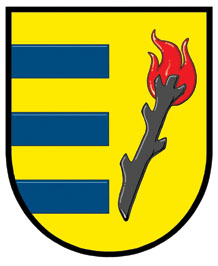
- Flag Coat of arms

- Location in the Czech Republic
- Coordinates: 50°0′9″N 14°35′1″E
- Country: Czech Republic
- Region: Central Bohemian
- District: Prague-East
- First mentioned: 1227

Area
  - Total: 4.43 km^{2} (1.71 sq mi)
- Elevation: 309 m (1,014 ft)

Population (2026-01-01)
  - Total: 778
  - Density: 176/km^{2} (455/sq mi)
- Time zone: UTC+1 (CET)
  - Summer (DST): UTC+2 (CEST)
- Postal code: 251 70
- Website: www.cestlice-obec.cz

Čestlice is a municipality and village in Prague-East District in the Central Bohemian Region of the Czech Republic. It has about 800 inhabitants. It is known for Aquapalace Prague, which is the largest water park in the country, and for an extensive commercial zone.

== Etymology ==
The oldest written form of the name is Šestlice. This would mean that the name is derived from the personal name Šestl, meaning "the village of Šestla's people", and later was distorted. However, it is likely that the name was actually derived from the name Čestl or Čestla and contained a typo in the oldest records.

== Geography ==
Čestlice is located about 5 kilometres (3 mi) southeast of Prague. It lies in a flat agricultural landscape in the Prague Plateau.

== History ==
The first written mention of Čestlice is from 1227. In 1457, the fortress in Čestlice was first mentioned. From 1541 to 1927, it was a property of Průhonice.

== Demographics ==
Historical population

Year	Pop.	±%
1869	313	—
1880	341	+8.9%
1890	345	+1.2%
1900	316	−8.4%
1910	348	+10.1%

Year	Pop.	±%
1921	352	+1.1%
1930	389	+10.5%
1950	313	−19.5%
1961	300	−4.2%
1970	280	−6.7%

Year	Pop.	±%
1980	347	+23.9%
1991	405	+16.7%
2001	405	+0.0%
2011	633	+56.3%
2021	742	+17.2%

Source: Censuses

== Economy ==
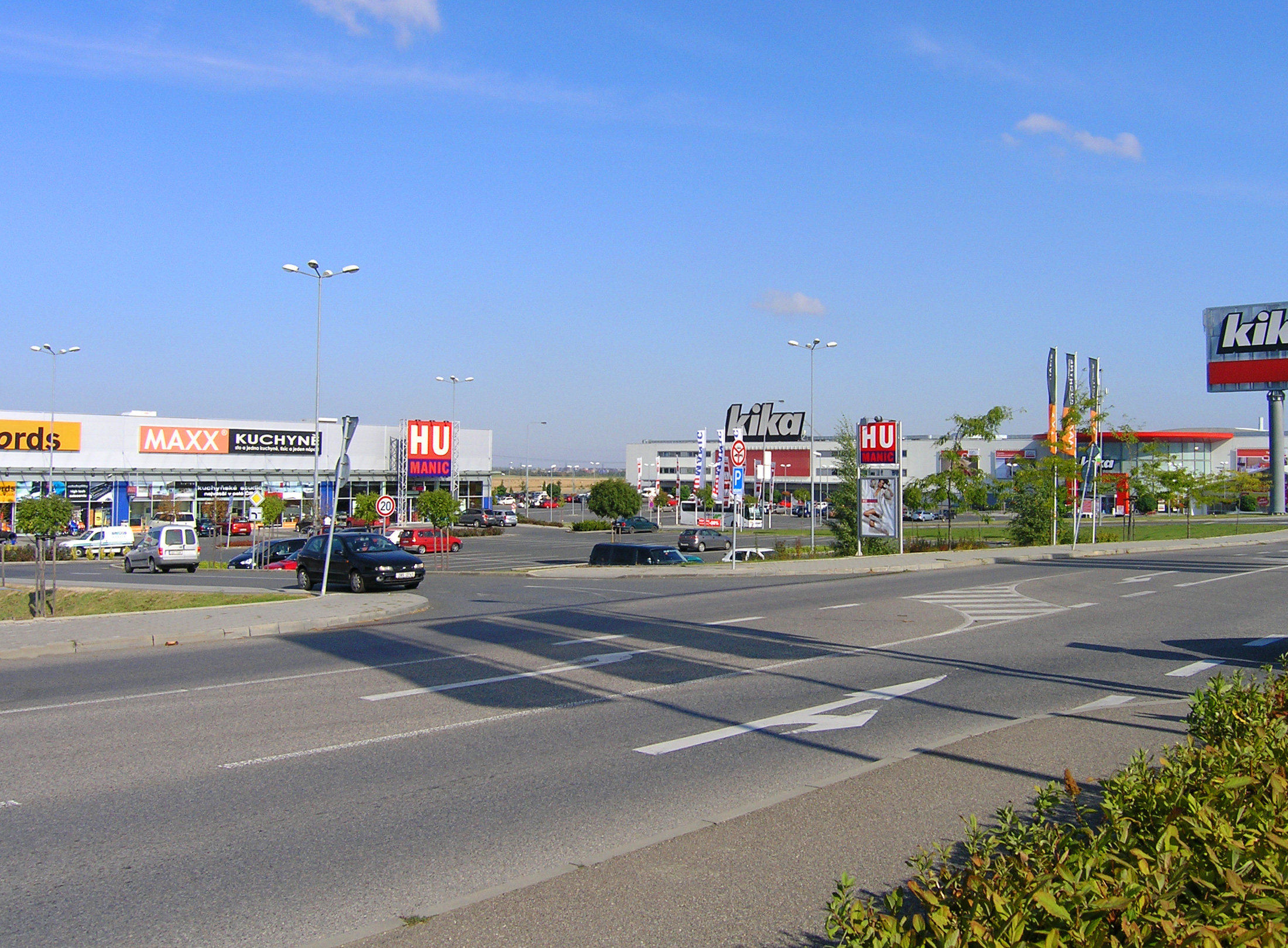
Čestlice Shopping Zone

Aquapalace Prague, the biggest water park in the Czech Republic, is located in Čestlice. Čestlice is also known for its large commercial zone, which serves mainly for the inhabitants of Prague.

== Transport ==
The D1 motorway runs across the municipality.

== Sights ==
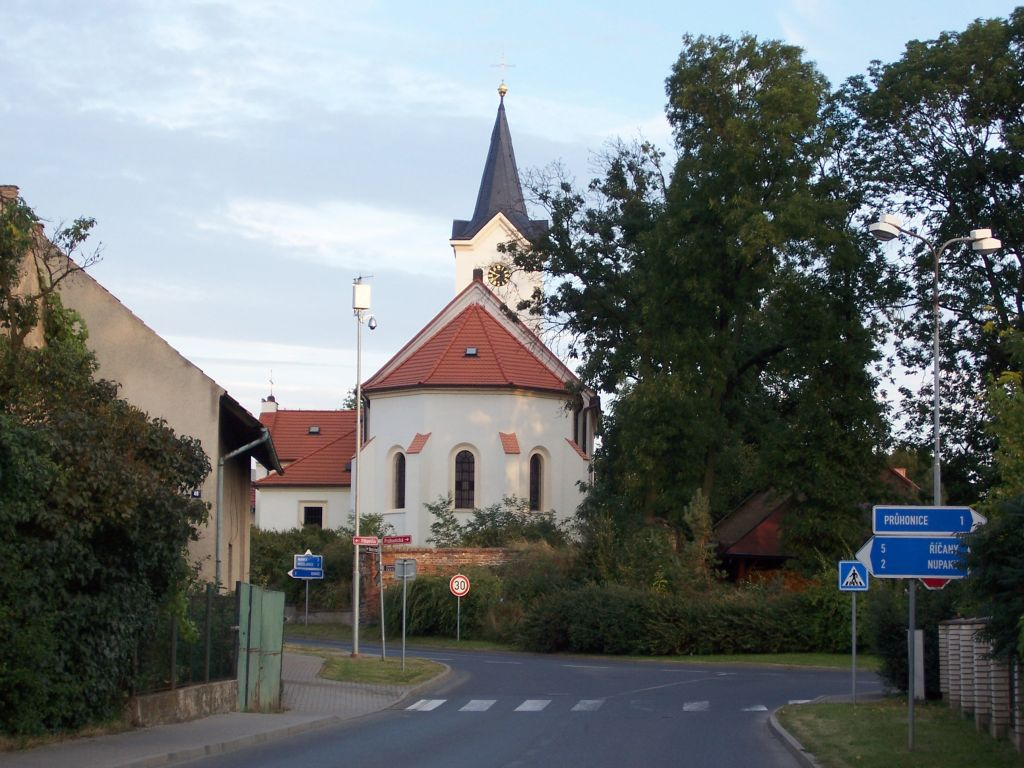
Church of Saint Procopius

The main historical landmark of Čestlice is the Church of Saint Procopius. It was built in 1863–1864, on the place where a small church was documented already in the 14th century.
