= St. Procopius Basilica in Třebíč =

UNESCO World Heritage Site
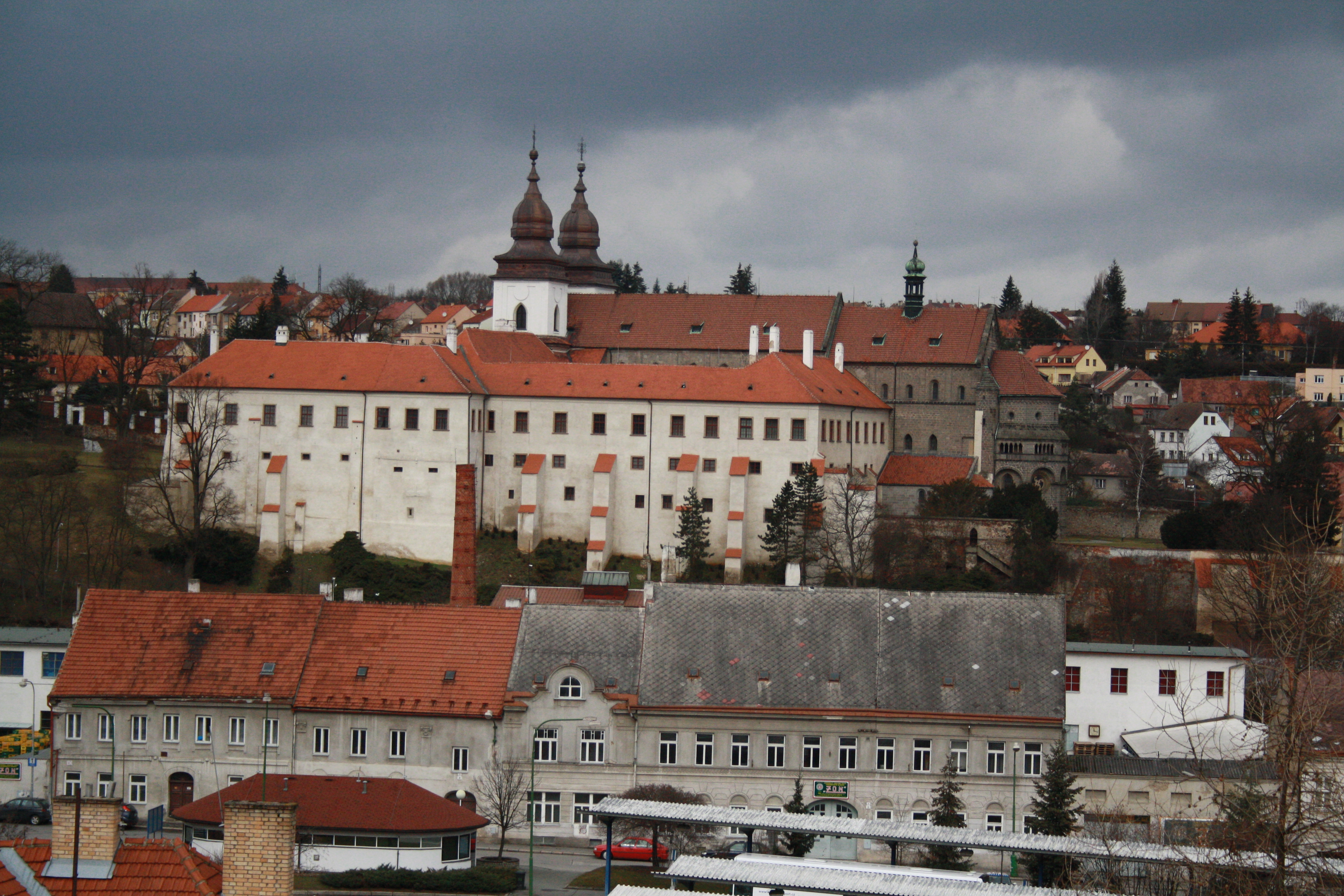
- Overview of Basilica of Saint Procopius in Třebíč
- Interactive map of St. Procopius Basilica in Třebíč
- Official name: St Procopius' Basilica
- Location: Třebíč, Vysočina Region, Czech Republic
- Part of: Jewish Quarter and St Procopius' Basilica in Třebíč
- Criteria: Cultural: (ii), (iii)
- Reference: 1078-003
- Area: 0.2301 ha (0.569 acres)
- Coordinates: 49°13′1.03″N 15°52′25.09″E

St. Procopius Basilica (Czech: Bazilika svatého Prokopa) is a Romanesque-Gothic Christian church in Třebíč, Czech Republic. It was built on the site of the original Virgin Mary's Chapel of the Benedictine monastery in 1240–1260. It became a national cultural monument in 2002 as a part of the "monastery with St. Procopius church". The basilica together with the Jewish Quarter in Třebíč were inscribed as a UNESCO World Heritage Site in 2003, because of their exceptional testimony to the exchange of culture and values in the regions.

The basilica was originally dedicated to the Assumption of the Virgin Mary. Saint Procopius became the Patron saint of the basilica on the quincentenary his canonization in 1704. Jan Karel, Count of Valdštejn established a castle chapel of St. Procopius from the presbytery of the basilica.

As of 2013, the renovated Třebíč castle is a museum adjacent to the Basilica.

== History ==
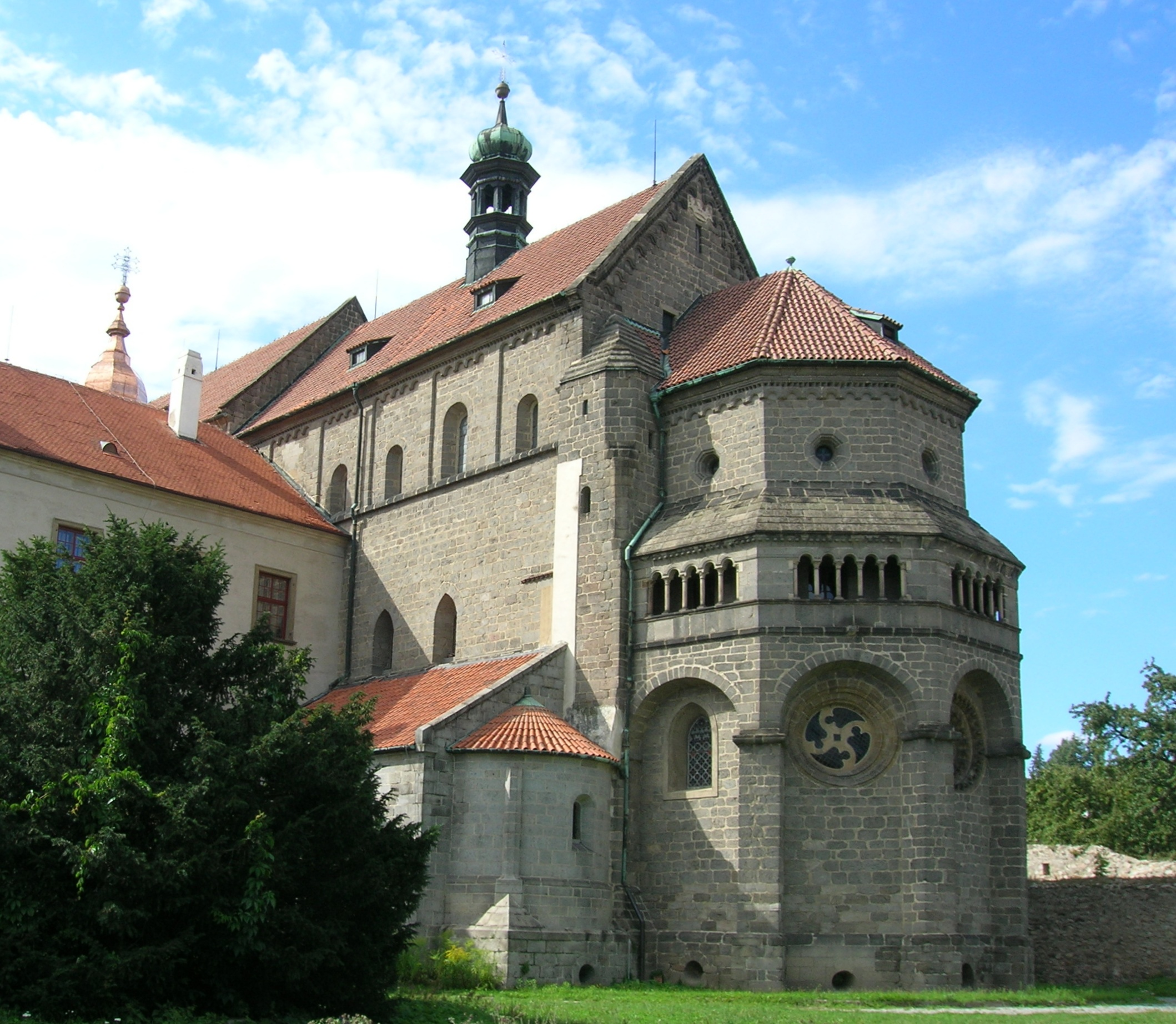
Basilica of St Procopius

The history of the basilica is closely associated with the history of the former Benedictine monastery in Třebíč. Before the basilica was constructed there was a chapel of St. Procopius, which was built in the year 1104 and was consecrated by Heřman, Bishop of Prague. Five years later, the monastery already had its own church. This was consecrated in year 1109 by then Bishop of Prague, Jan II. In the crypt of the church Duke Litold Znojemský was buried, one of the founders of the monastery, and three years later his brother and Duke Oldřich Brněnský, the second founder of the monastery, was likewise interred.

The monastery grew rich and its influence swelled. For about half of the 13th century the monastery was rebuilt and fortified. This reconstruction was started in about the year 1240 and finished in the year 1260. The reconstruction meant the disappearance of romanesque architecture in the monastery, but allowed for the new basilica to be built. The basilica is preserved in its original style to this day.

== See also ==
- Czech Gothic architecture
