= Peter Oriešek =

Czech artist (1941–2015)

Acad. sculptor Peter Oriešek
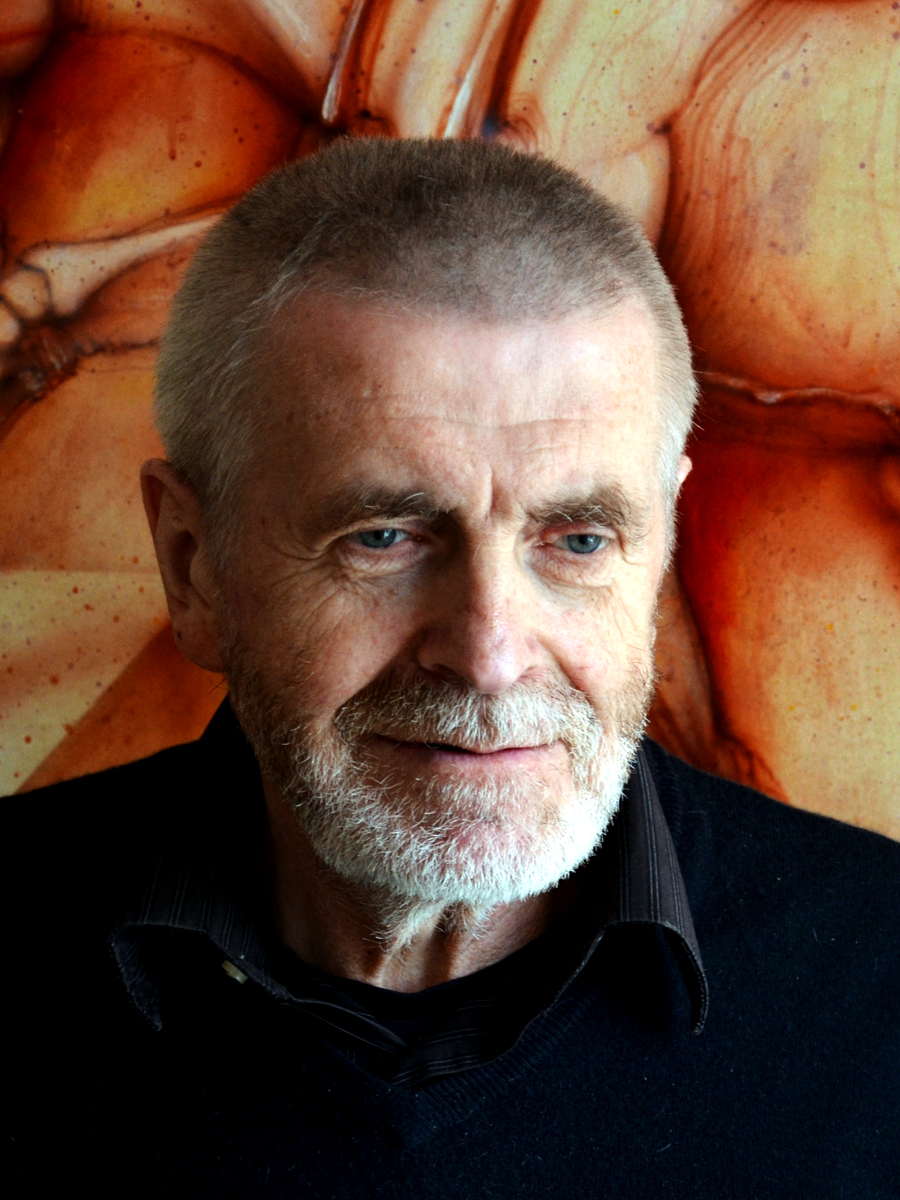
- Peter Oriešek in 2014
- Born: 28 August 1941; Dolná Súča, Slovak Republic
- Died: 18 October 2015 (aged 74); Prague, Czech Republic
- Education: School of Arts and Crafts in Prague
- Known for: sculptor, medallist, painter, teacher at the Academy of Fine Arts in Prague
- Spouse: Petra Oriešková

Peter Oriešek (28 August 1941 – 18 October 2015) was a Czech sculptor, medallist, painter and teacher at the Academy of Fine Arts in Prague.

== Life ==
Peter Oriešek was born on 28 August 1941 in Dolná Súča, Slovak Republic. He studied at the Secondary School of Art Industry in Bratislava (prof. Ľudovít Korkoš) and in 1960–1966 at the Academy of Arts and Crafts in Prague, in the sculpture studios of prof. Jan Kavan and Josef Malejovský.

After graduation he was a freelance sculptor. He exhibited independently for the first time in 1969 and then only since the late 1980s. His original artistic expression, which interprets the situation of man in the middle of the world, has its origin in the unfavourable social atmosphere in the country occupied for twenty years by Soviet troops. The "cruelty of truth" is not an art for its own sake in his works, but restores the form to its original and, in the historical context, legitimate sense of making it present, visible and objectified. It expresses sensibility, existential anxiety and the irrational situation of life.

Since 1995, he has been a teacher at the Academy of Fine Arts in Prague, and since 1999 also at the VŠUP.

He was a member of the Association of Medal Artists, a founding member of the groups Tolerance and Lipany (1989), member of the Mánes Union of Fine Arts (1990) and the civic association Figurama (2001). He died in Prague on 18 October 2015. His wife Petra Oriešková was a prominent Czech academic painter.

== Work ==
=== Sculpture ===
Peter Oriešek graduated at a time when the domestic scene was moving away from abstract art and a space was opening up for brilliant draughtsmen who were absorbing the impulses of Pop Art, Hyperrealism, and especially the broad current of New Figuration associated with a renewed interest in physicality. In his early sculptural works, expressive exaggeration is evident (Male Figure, 1965, Dead Horse, 1970s), but in his later work, despite the harshness of his expression, he adheres to realistic modelling. The sheer materiality of the human and animal figures, more vital than the actual cast body, is often obscured by a fanciful polychromy (Figure, 164 cm, 1969). The sculptures, cast in transparent artificial resin, offer an insight into the interior with an expressive colour confusion of viscera (Figure, h. 166 cm, 1968, Pillow, 1968–1969, Birth, 1969). The existential theme of disgust, which has undergone the alienating lessons of pop art, is pushed to an ironic position in these sculptures.

His major works from the early 1970s are several variants of Anatomy of Silence (1970, GASK collection), created as polychromed assemblages of biomorphic abstract shapes in artificial resin, on a panel with a woman's head.

In the early 1970s, inspired by a trip to Greece, he created sculptural compositions loosely referencing Minoan culture and the mythical Minotaur. However, the way in which Oriešek recalls the Greek mythical perception of the world, embedded in the foundations of European civilization, points to the ways in which this tradition was carried over during the Renaissance and Mannerism. Apart from ancient sculpture, his major influences were Michelangelo, Giambologna and Adrian de Vries.

The main core of his work, however, are sculptures that come from the world of inner imagination and dream visions. Like some of Karel Pauzer's sculptures, Oriešek's phantasmatic creatures are metaphorical representations of the animal nature of man (Animals, 1987–1989). Bodies with taut musculature are replete with physiological processes beneath a shockingly naked surface. The animal figures inspire terror with their exaltation and recall the deceptive mutability of a world dominated by aggression, anger, psychological coercion and helpless defiance. Oriešek's scenes of passion and destruction draw the viewer in with their narrativity, depicting stories that resemble dreamlike images. The author intended them to express his incipient alienation from his surroundings and the absurdity of an existentialist conception of existence or an anxiety fed by inner despondency. (Anatomy of Silence, 1970, GASK)

The sculptures are modelled with attention to detail, the combination of human and animal figures expressing emotions, fear or violence is captured in dynamic positions. The tension is also contained in the contrast of the realistic modelling of the figure in a tense pose with surfaces containing static relief or with elements symbolising death and decay (Extinction, 1979–1985). If the sculptor's main intention is to express dynamism, the sculpture is conceived as an unfolding of the movement phases of a single figure walking down the stairs, whose arms rise at the end to meet the coming hope (Journey towards Light, 1992).

The sculptures were primarily intended to be cast in bronze or resin, but some chamber works remained as models in their original material – a mixture of beeswax, asphalt and rosin – and are polychromed. The ceramic works were created in collaboration with Jindra Viková (Fountain, Atrium Žižkov, Figural Relief for the metro station (unrealised). Peter Oriešek was also involved in medallic and relief work, which was also published as a blind print (Faust, 1987), (Adam and Eve, 1988).

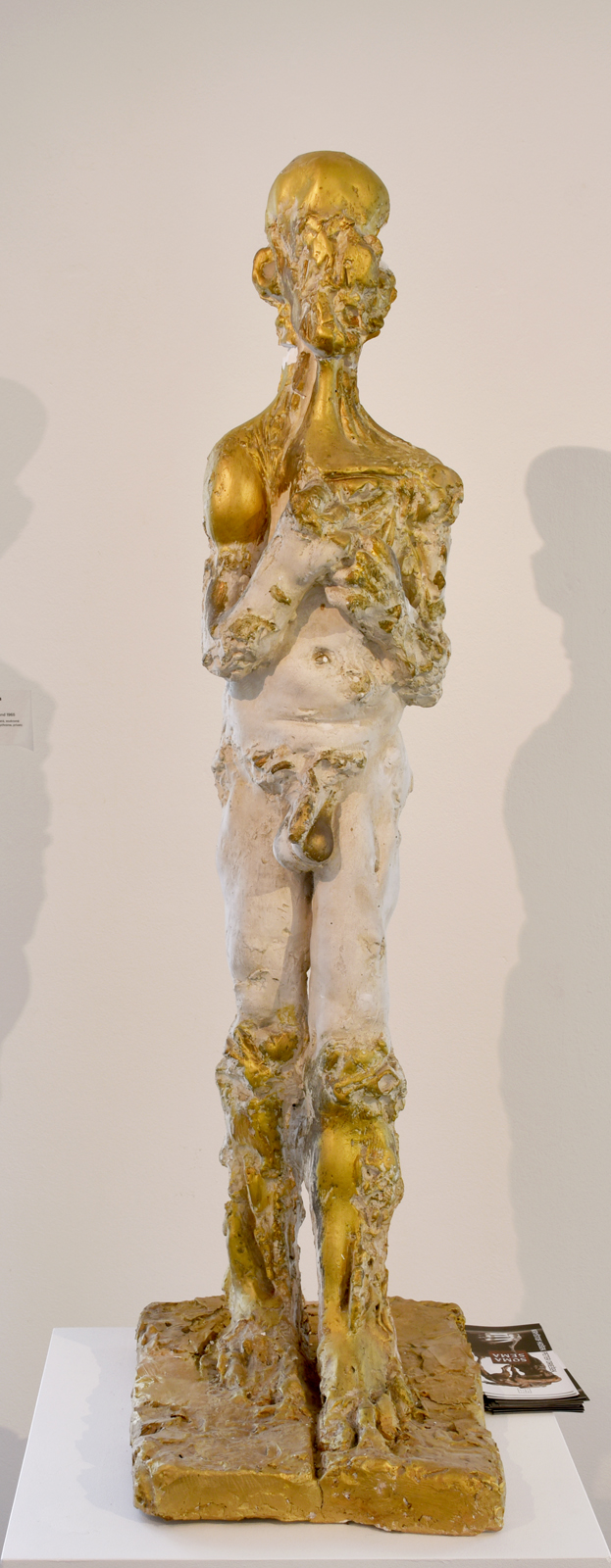
Male Figure (circa 1965)

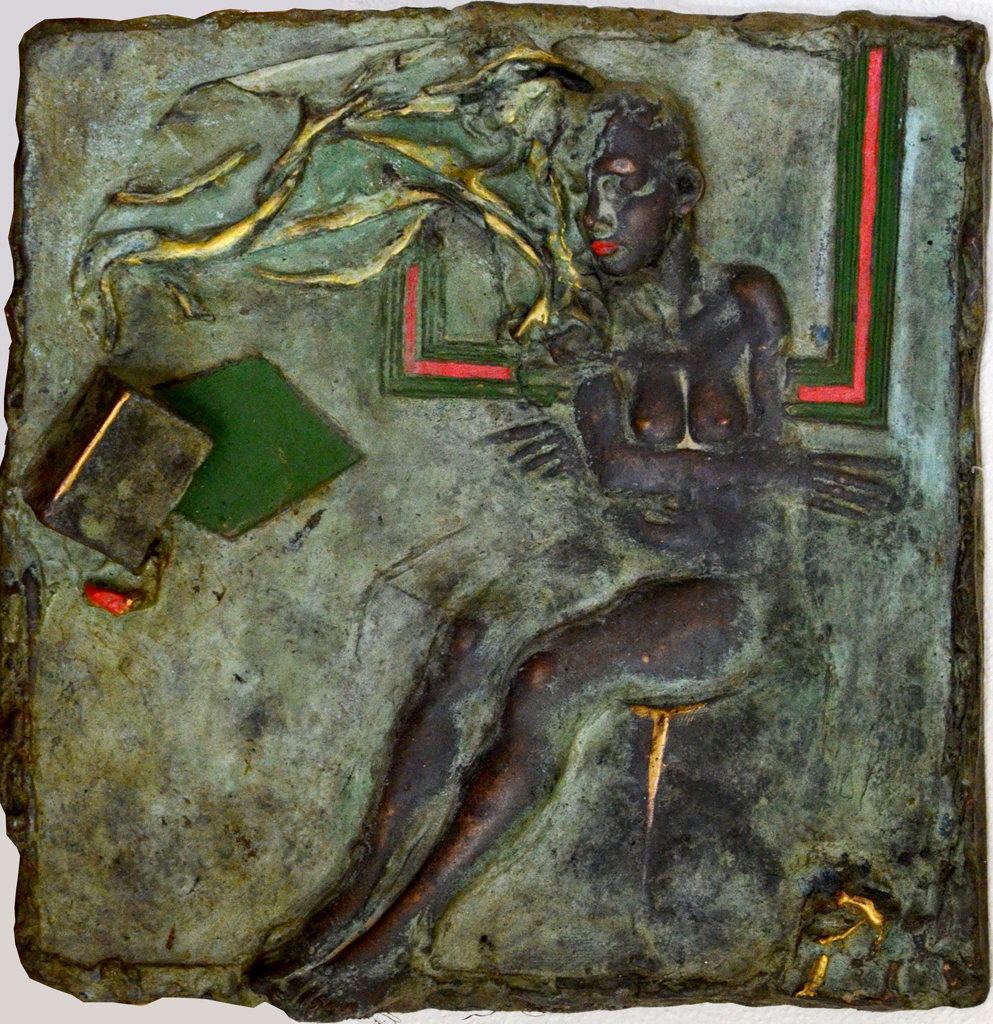
Untitled, undated, bronze relief 38x37 cm

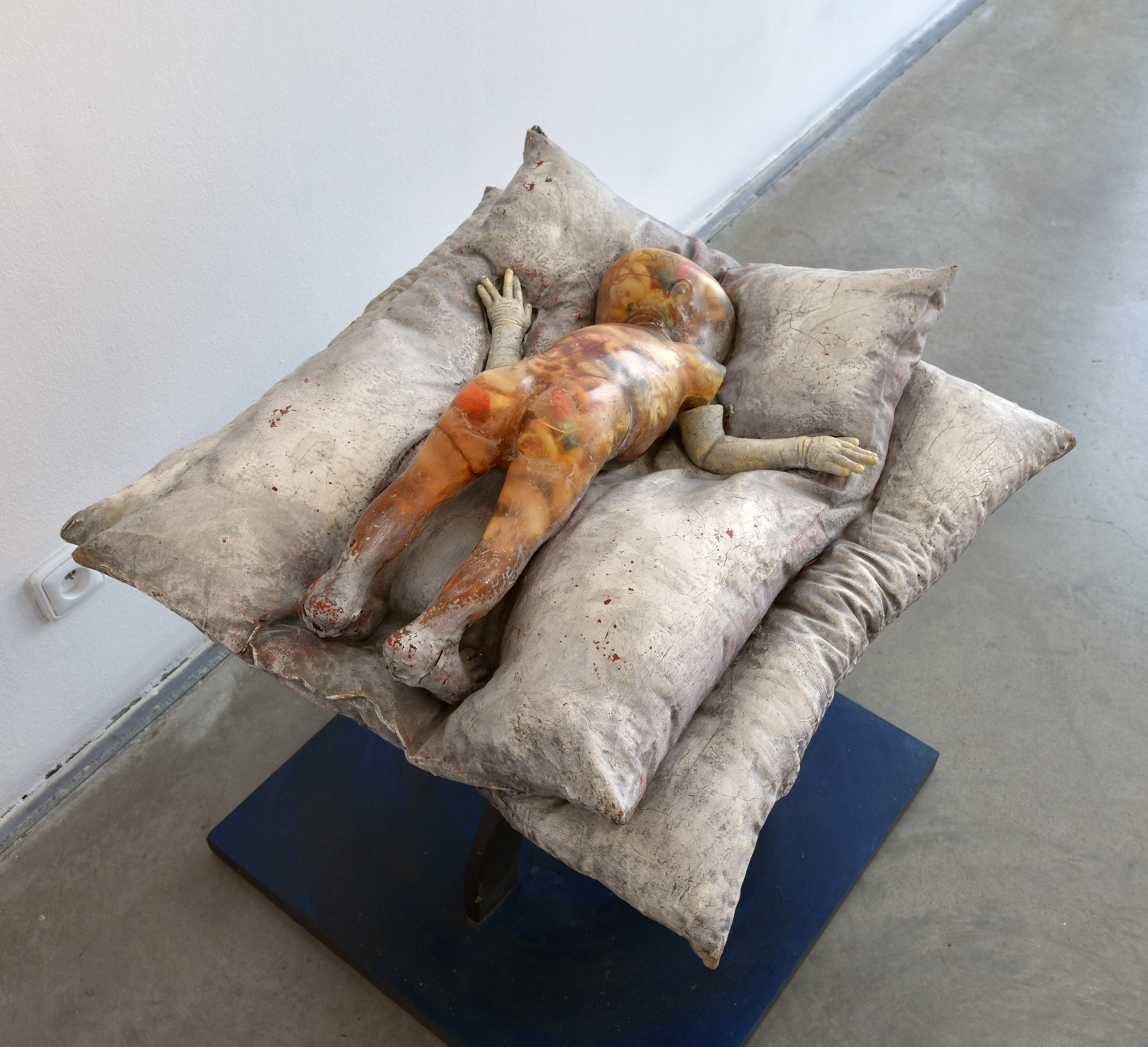
Untitled- Pillow (1968–1969)

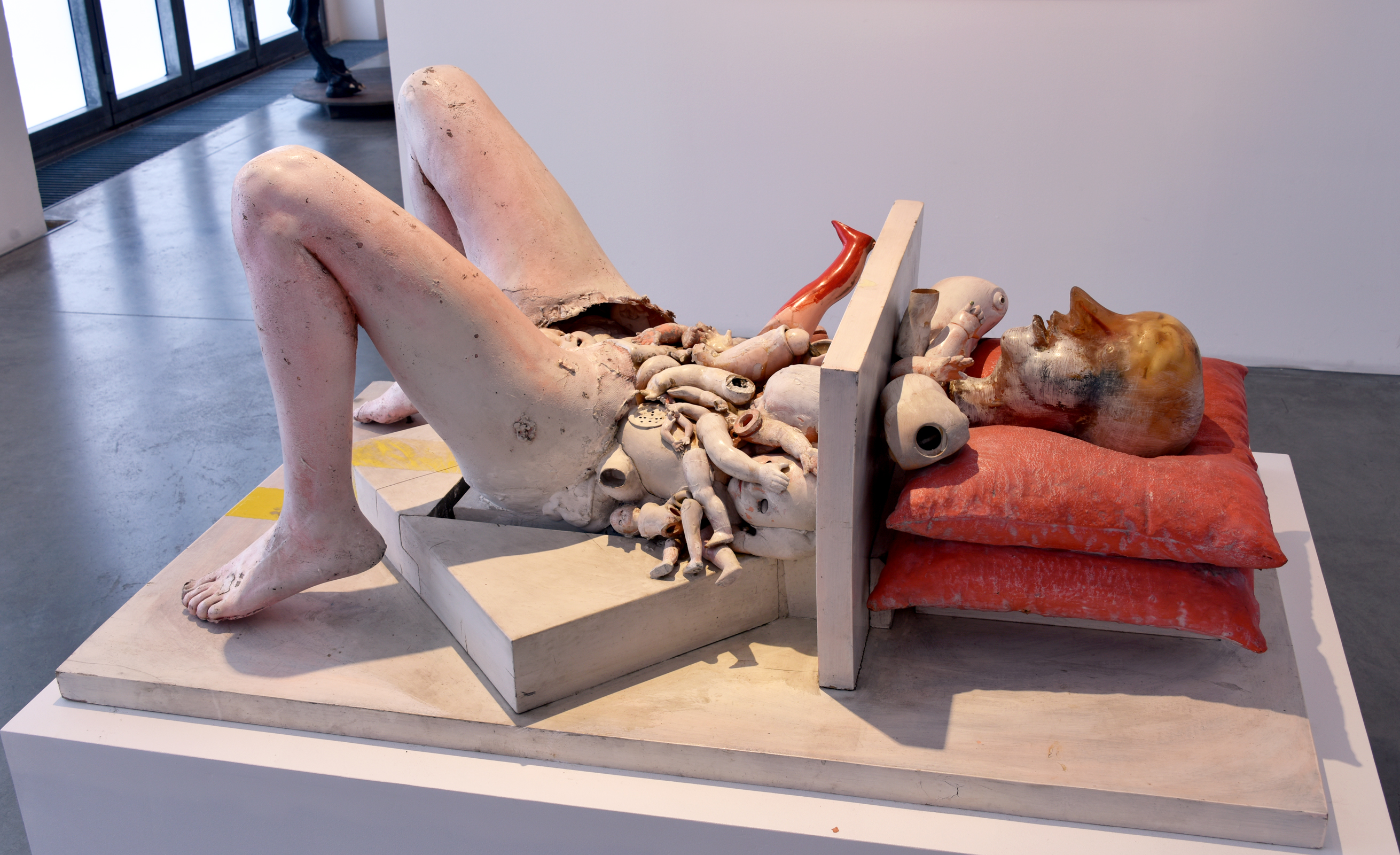
Lying (Birth) (1969)

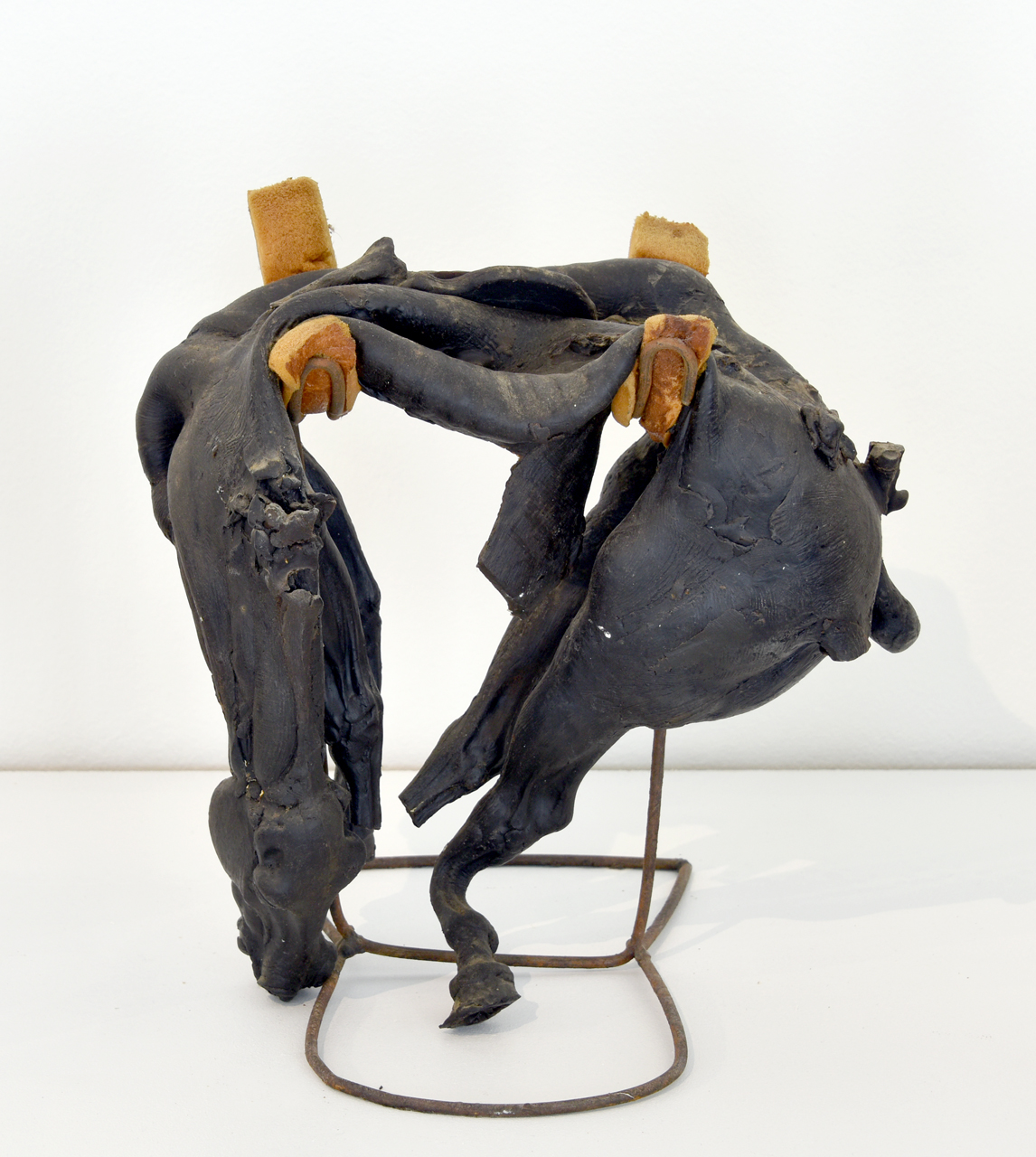
Dead horse (1970s)

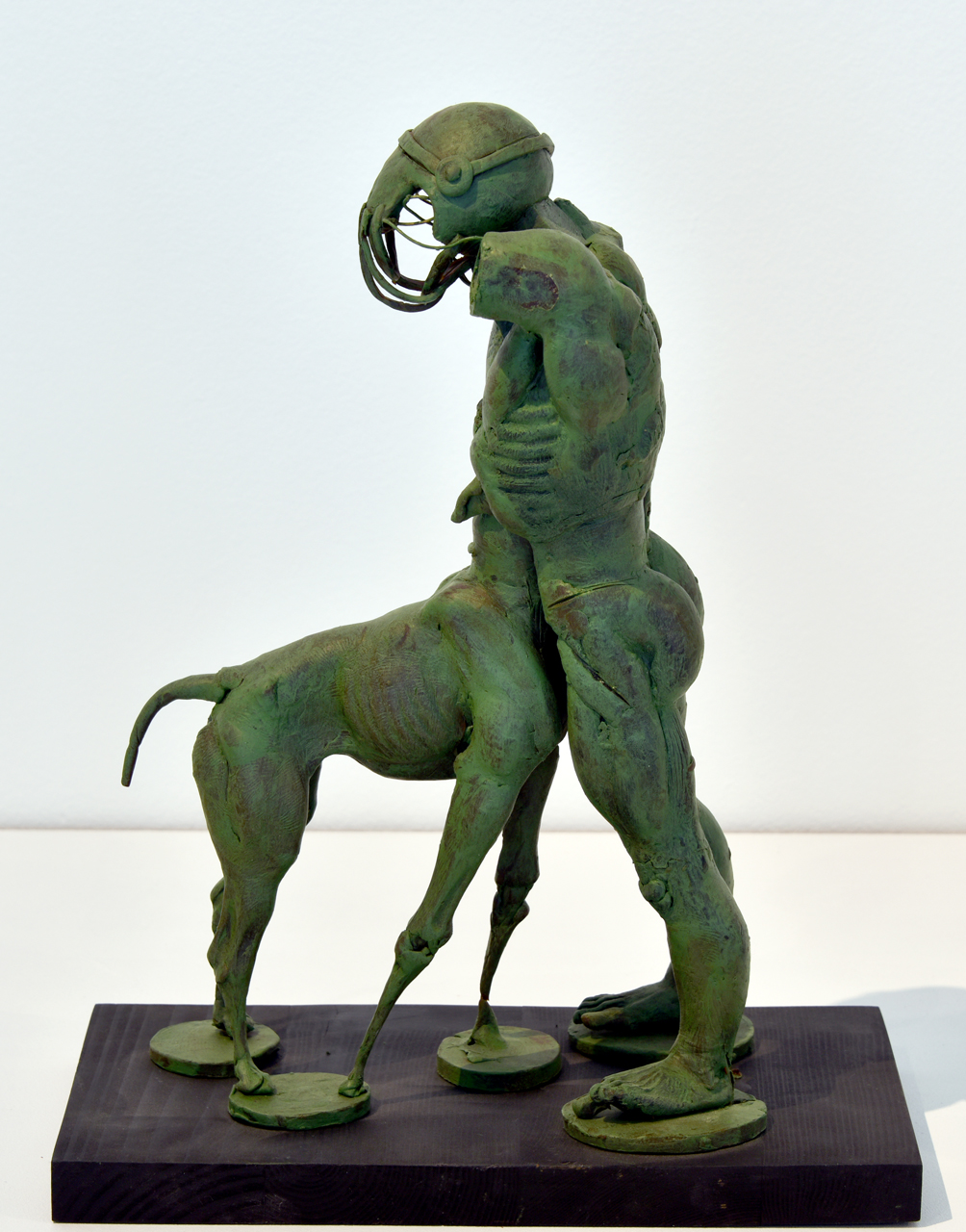
Untitled

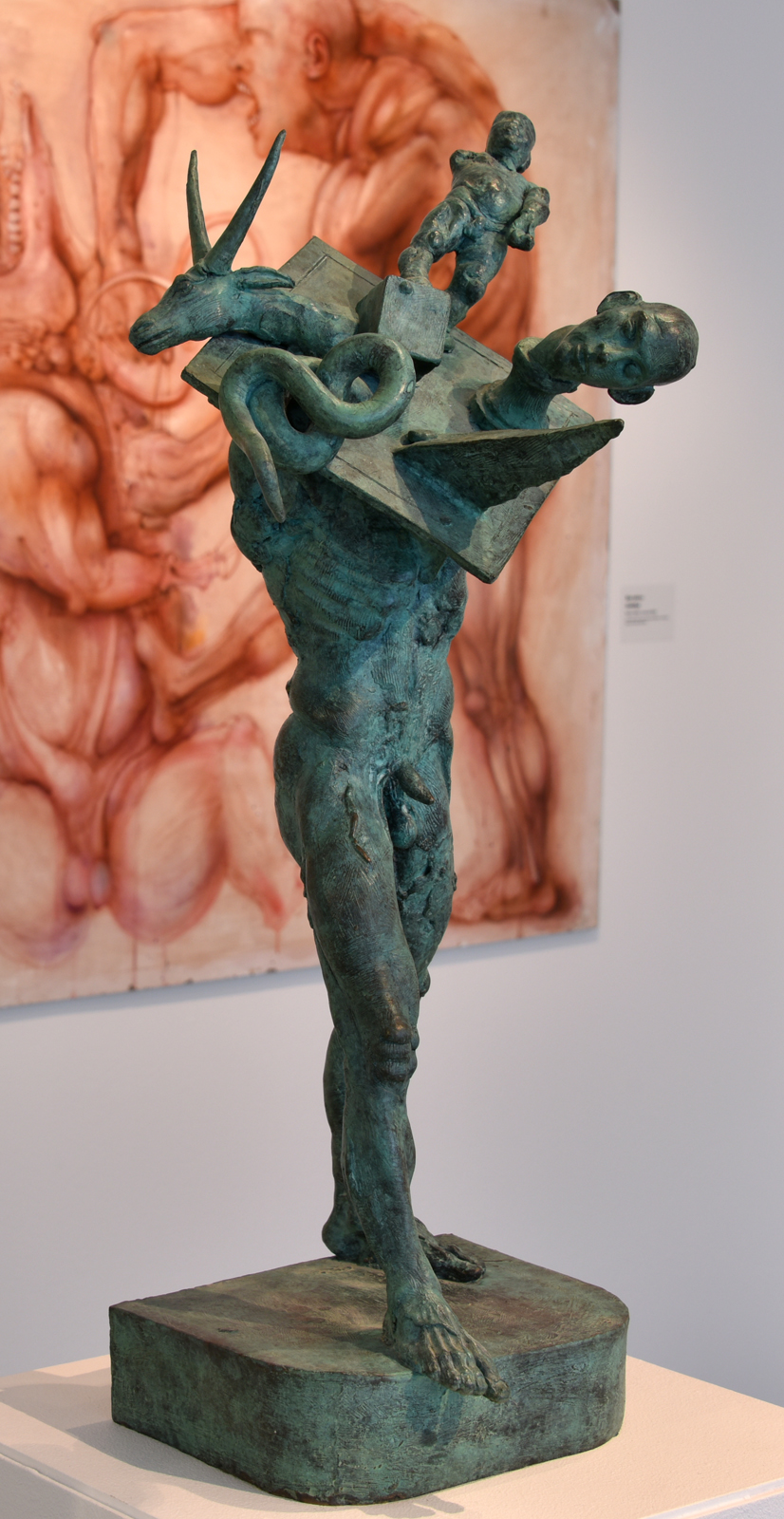
Monster (circa 1985)

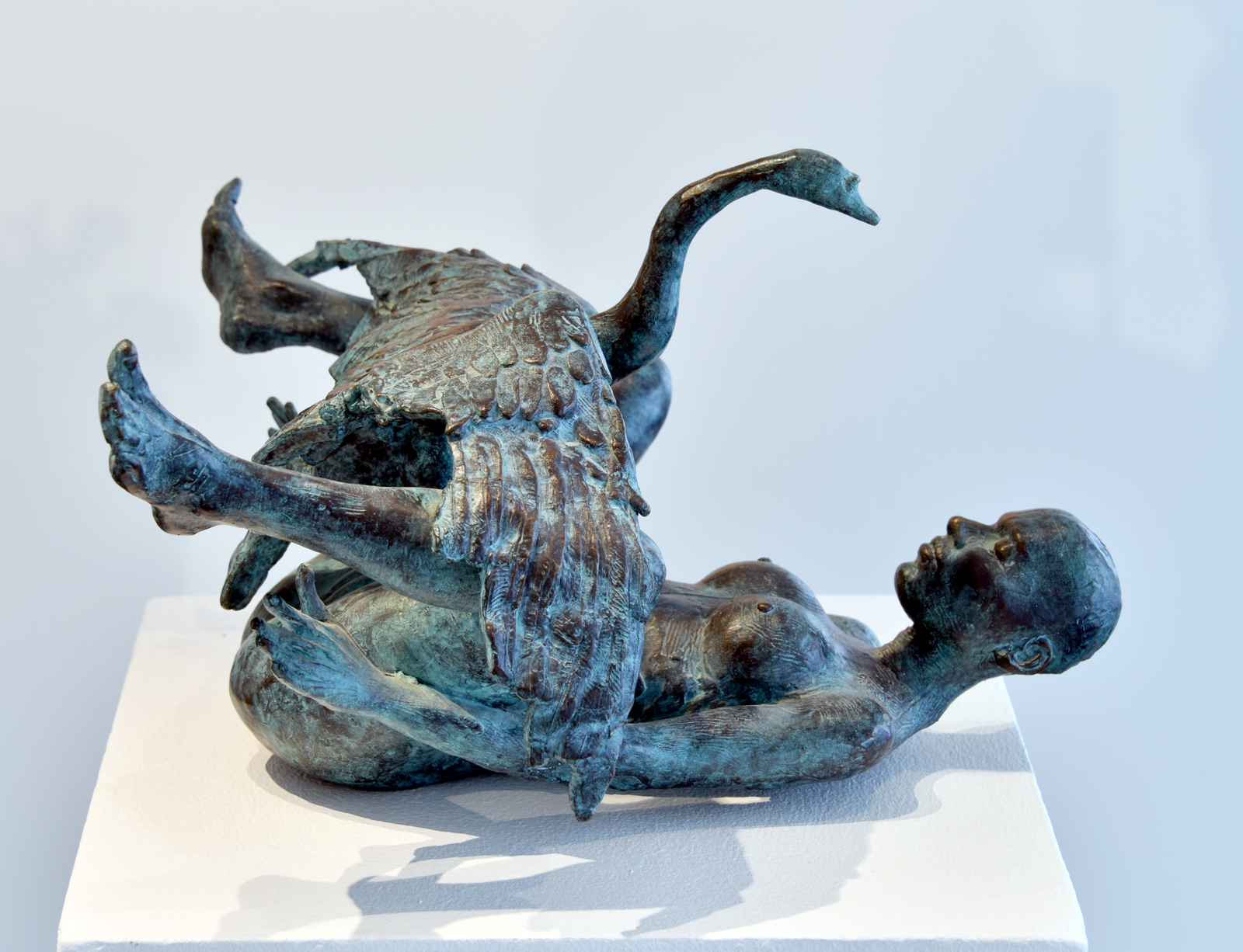
Leda and the Swan (1990)

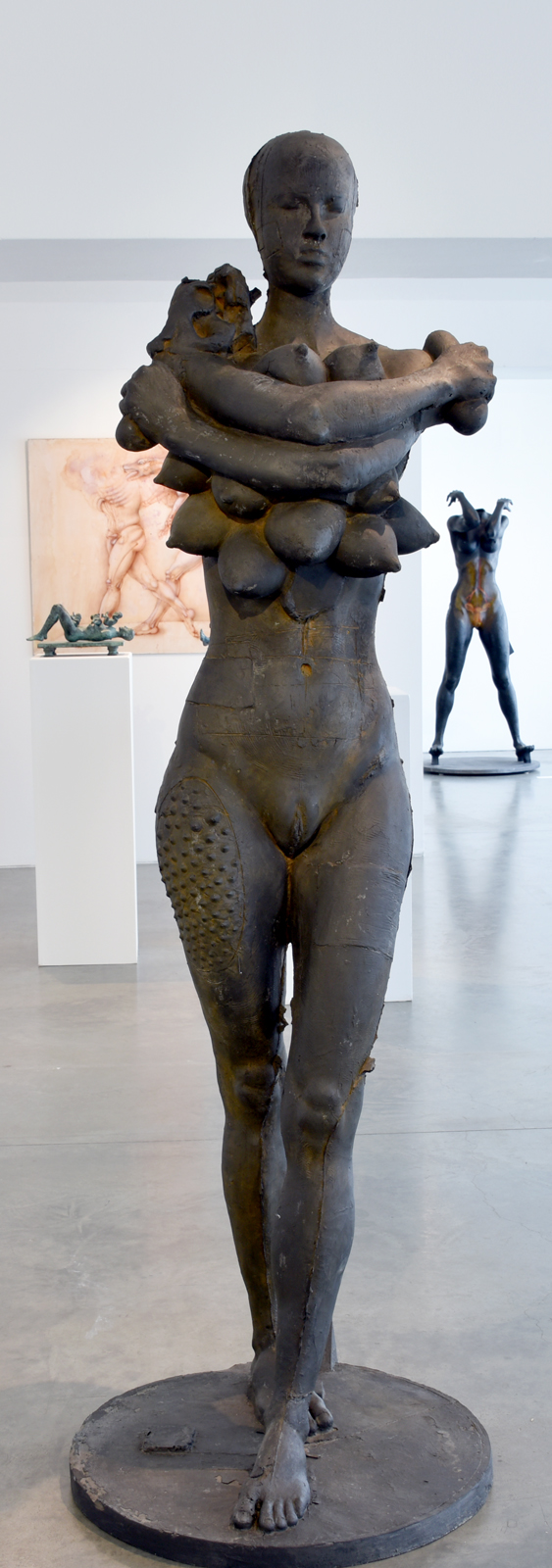
Kybelé (1991)

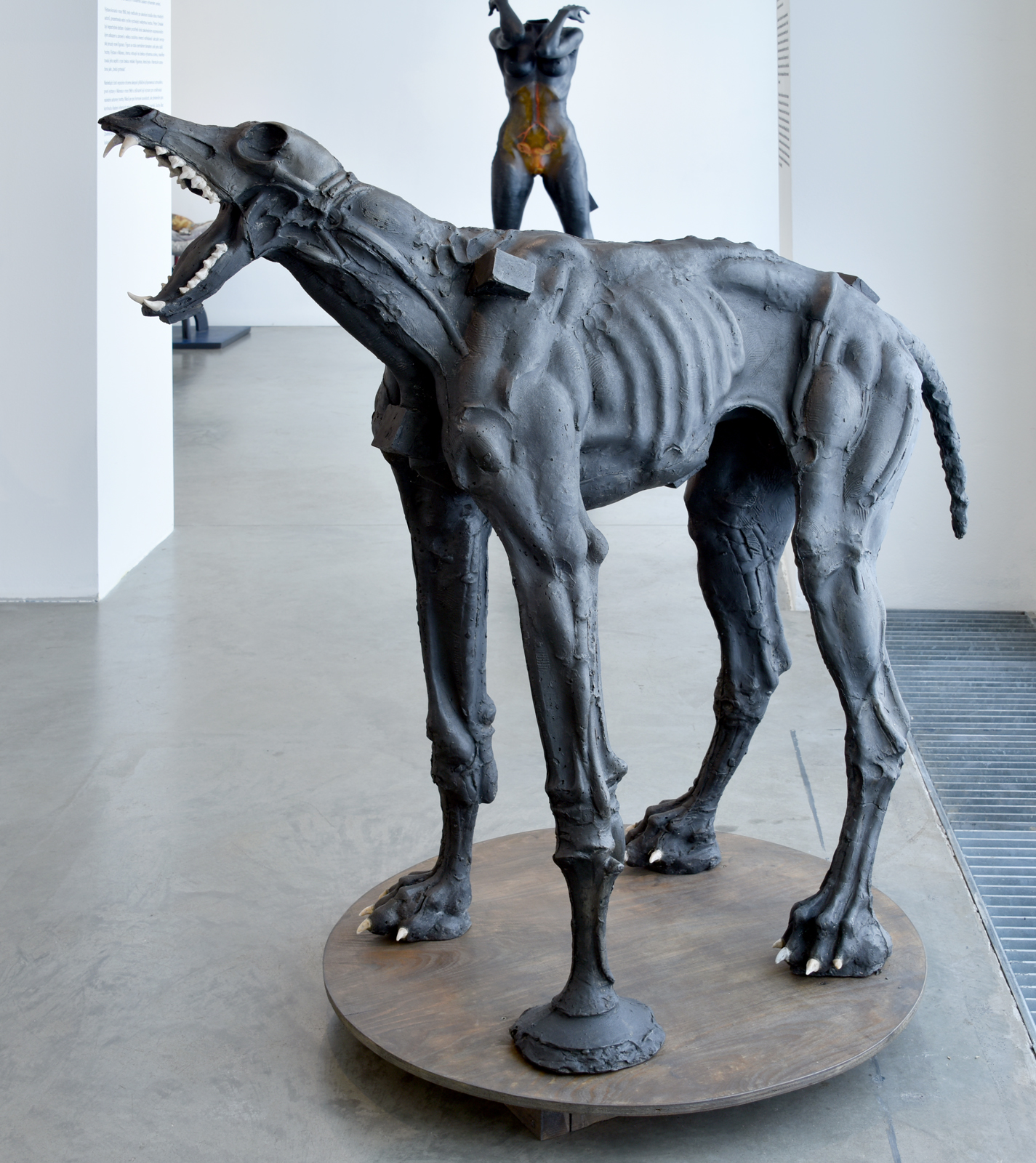
Animal (after 2000)

=== Drawing and painting ===
The turn to drawing coincided with Oriešek's reflections on multi-figure sculptural compositions, but from the late 1970s and 1980s onwards, drawings became an entirely distinctive part of his work and, like his sculptures, depict a limit situation in life. Oriešek's drawings combine pure classicism and barbaric magic in a technically brilliant way and suggestively illustrate how close beauty and evil are to each other. They depict with extraordinary precision interpersonal relationships as epic-fantasy scenes. He later replaced the delicate and detailed modelling of hatched pencil drawings with the airbrush technique. The hyperbolic bizarreness of his drawing compositions has a direct counterpart in some of his sculptures.

The expressive conception, sculptural drawing of nude figures and dramatic scenes full of emotion and passion are also characteristic of the compositions of the large-scale images that Oriešek paints with American retouch (airbrush). The mastery of this technique allows the painter to create a perfect illusion of deep space or mirroring, the sepia colour evoking old drawings. All the paintings are filled with hidden meanings. The female bodies are formally perfectly beautiful and sensual even in tense conflict scenes, while the male and animal figures look like anatomical studies by a renaissance painter. Human and animal are intertwined with each other into one chimerical body, massive muscles and tendons are bared, veins filled to bursting, parts of their own skeletons protrude from the figures like a memento mori.

The fantasy world of the painter's imagination is brought into the real space of the sculptor's studio. In contrast to the hyperrealistic figures, elements of sculptural instrumentation are composed into the painting, such as plinths, columns, sculptural reinforcements and supports replacing parts of the bodies, or strange mushroom-like formations, balls of cords or tubes, reminding us that our technical civilization is part of this world.

Peter Oriešek is one of the leading representatives of the current generation of Czech modern painting and sculpture, which through new figuration reveals the inner complexity of man with his anxieties and frozen aggressiveness, while following the traditions of illusionistic painting.

According to Ivan Neumann, Oriešek has chosen artistic means that are traditional in appearance and that show an awareness of necessary continuity. The matter-of-factness, that is, the reality of his form, is overwhelming. Not, however, for the drama of the story, which moves, or for the drawing of line or form, which astonishes with certainty, but rather for the mystery and enigma of the emerging, seemingly self-evident shapes, the things of the world, which he both shows and hides.

Occasionally, he has worked on illustrations (Landing on Říp, 1988). In 2013, stamps and the cover of the first day's edition were published with drawings by Peter Oriek.

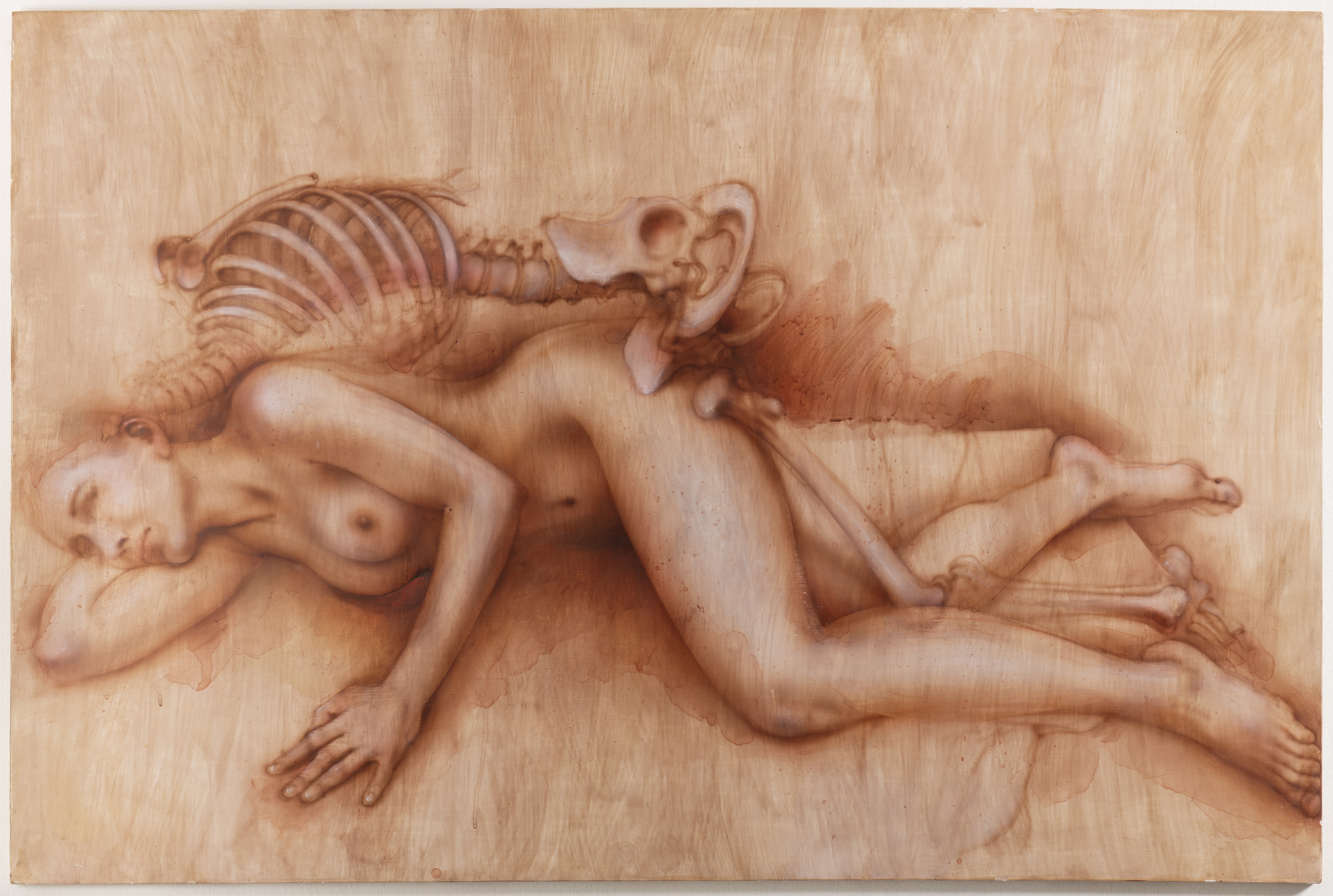
Untitled VIII, 1995–1997, sepia, airbrush, acrylic on paper and wood, 85 x 125 cm

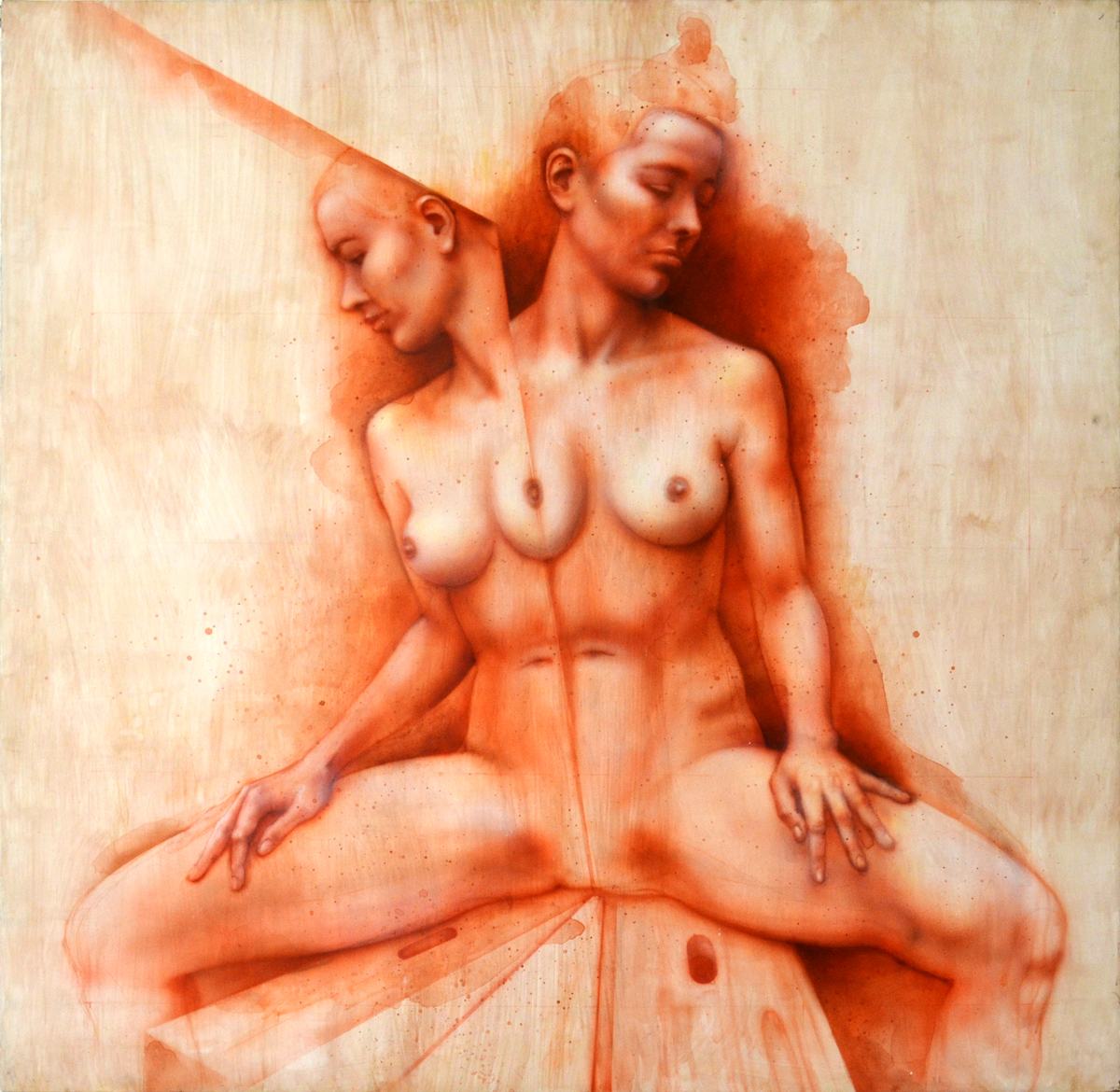
Untitled X, undated, airbrush, 121 x 120 cm

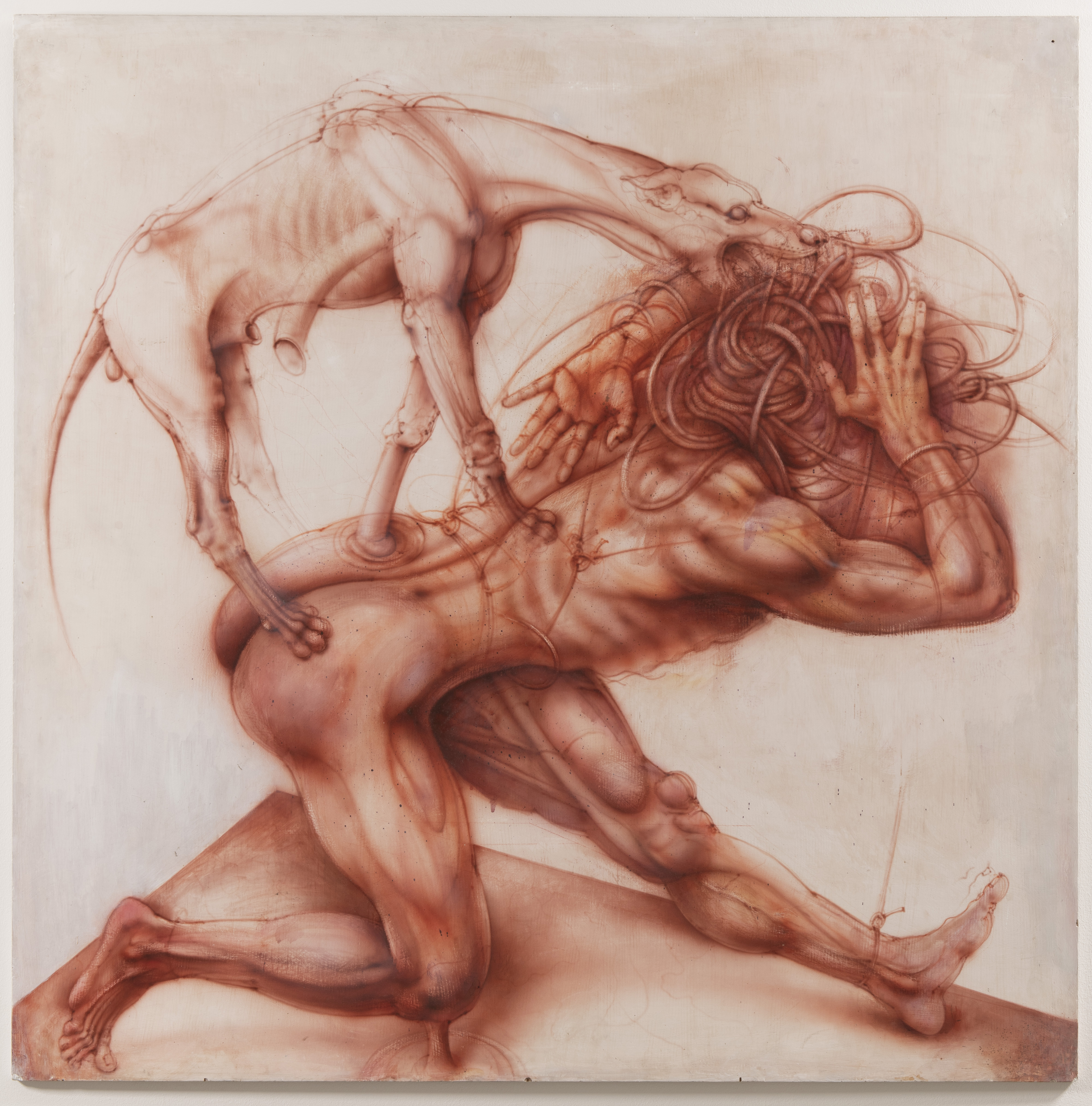
Untitled, 1995–1997, sepia, airbrush, acrylic on paper and wood, 120 x 120 cm

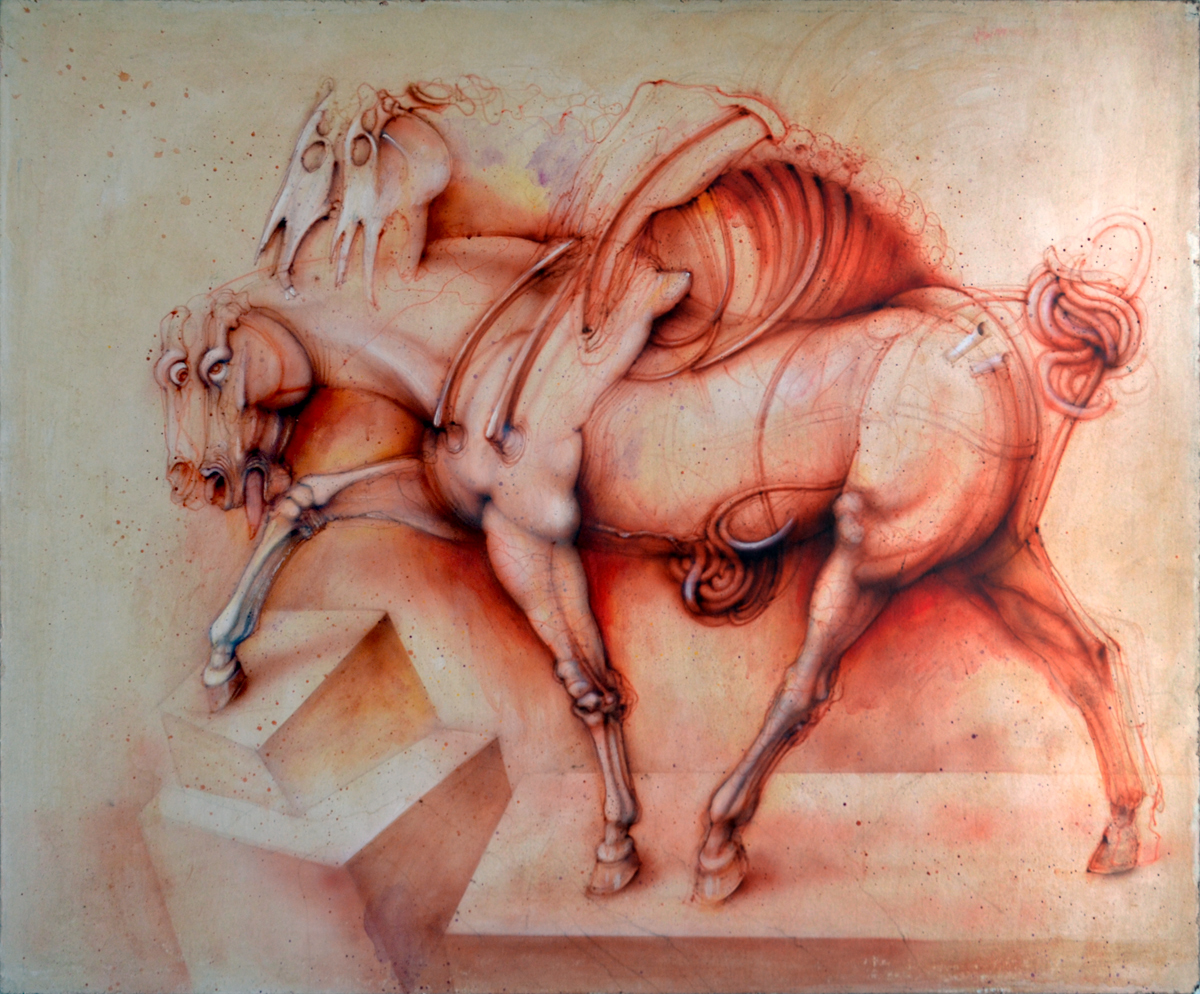
Untitled I, undated, airbrush, 100 x 123 cm

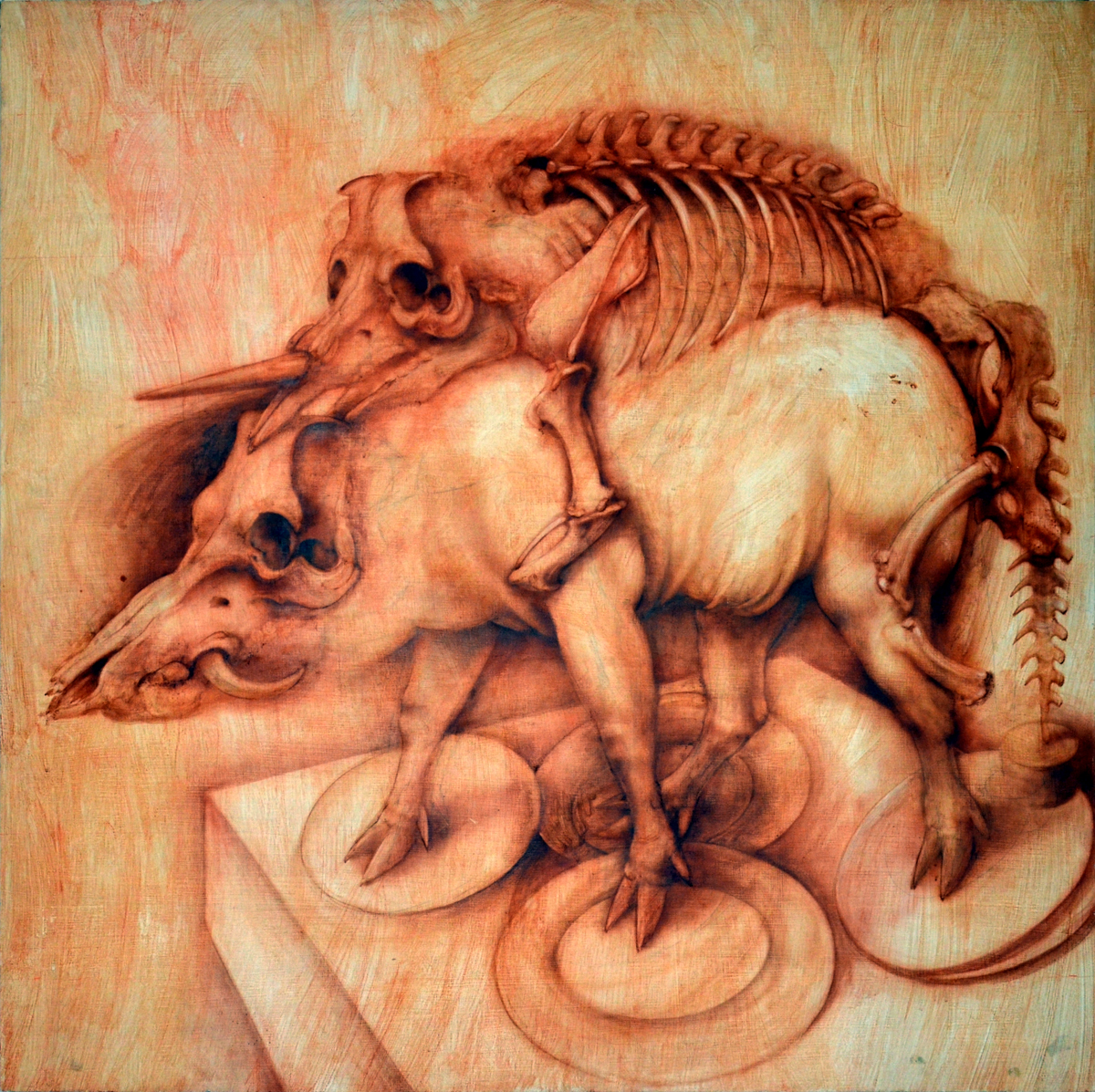
Untitled XI, undated, airbrush, 119 x 120 cm

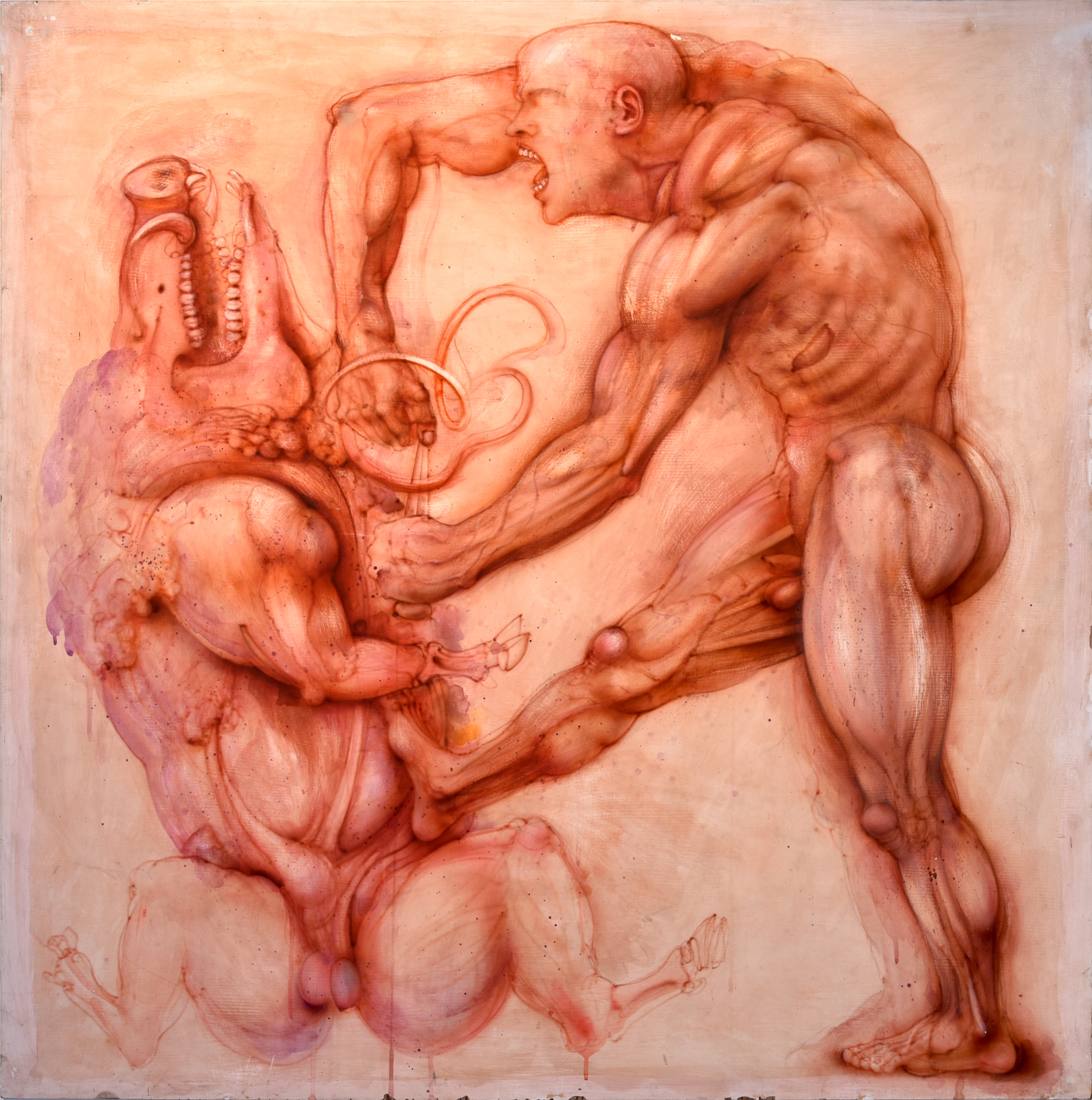
Untitled, airbrush (circa 1995)

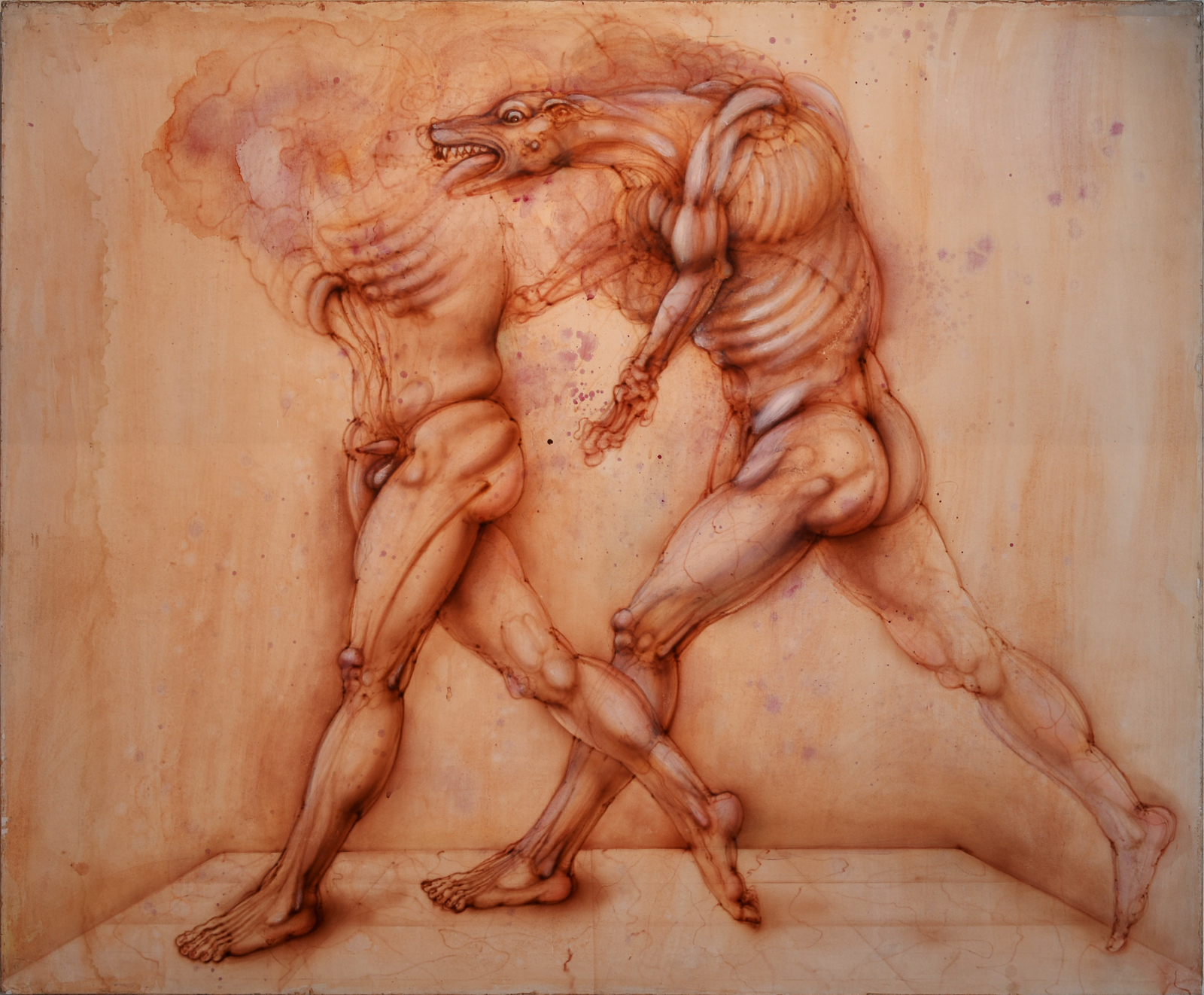
Untitled, airbrush (circa 1995)

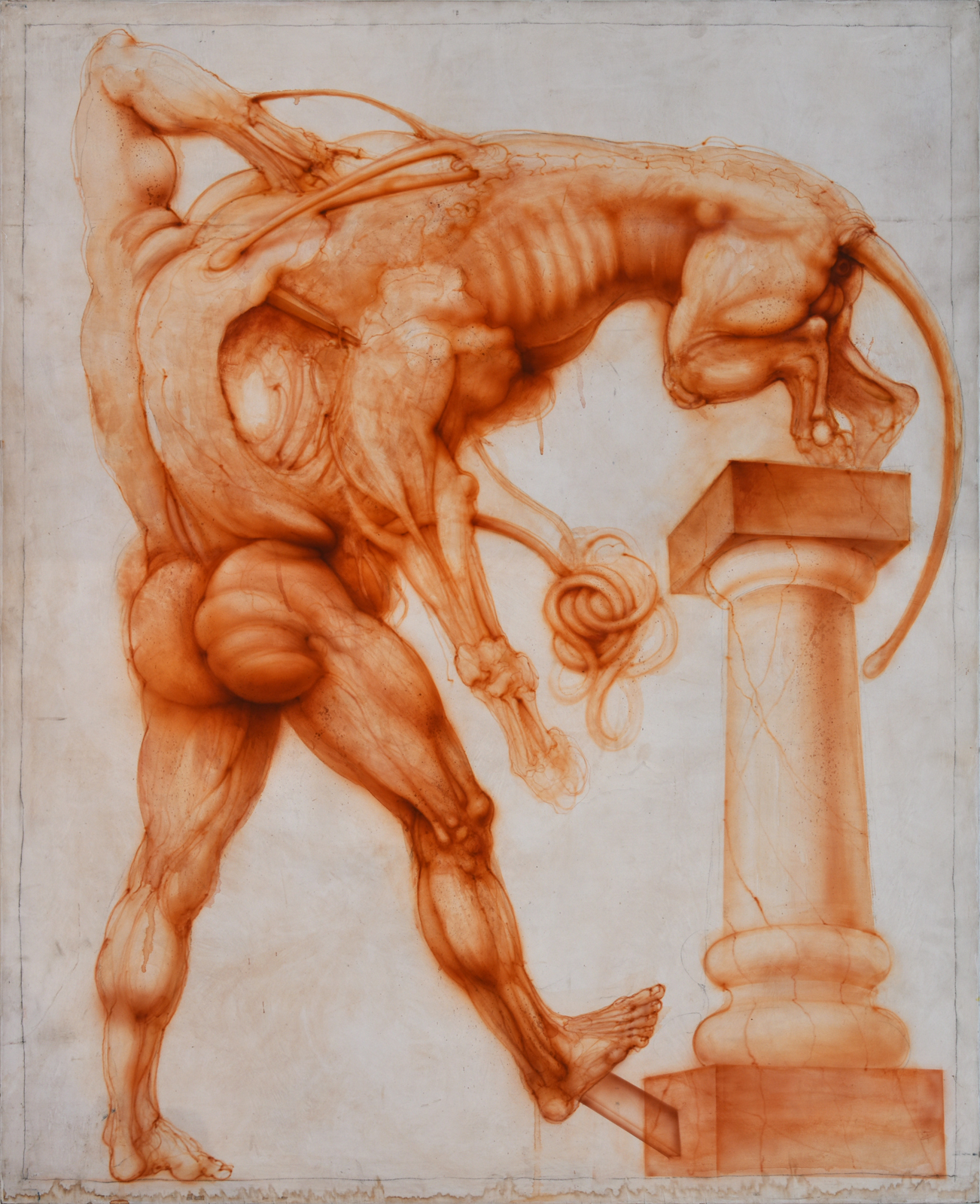
Untitled, airbrush (circa 1995)

=== Realisations ===
Peter Oriešek is the author of several figurative sculptures in public space as well as important memorial plaques. The plaque with the slogan When - if not now?, Who - if not us?, 17 November 1989 was unveiled on 16 November 2006 at Albertov, from where a procession of students marched on 17 November 1989, marking the beginning of the Velvet Revolution. A plaque with a bust of Václav Benda is installed on the house where the dissident Benda family lived.

- Ceramic mosaic on the rear facade of the Old Town Hall (Jindra Viková, Peter Oriešek, 1975)
- Mother and Child (1982), artificial stone, Prague-Strašnice
- Photographer and Model (1995), Central Military Hospital, Prague
- Girl with a Cage (1989), bronze, Fountain in the Park of the Na Homolce Hospital, 1991
- Bust of Václav Benda, Charles Square in Prague
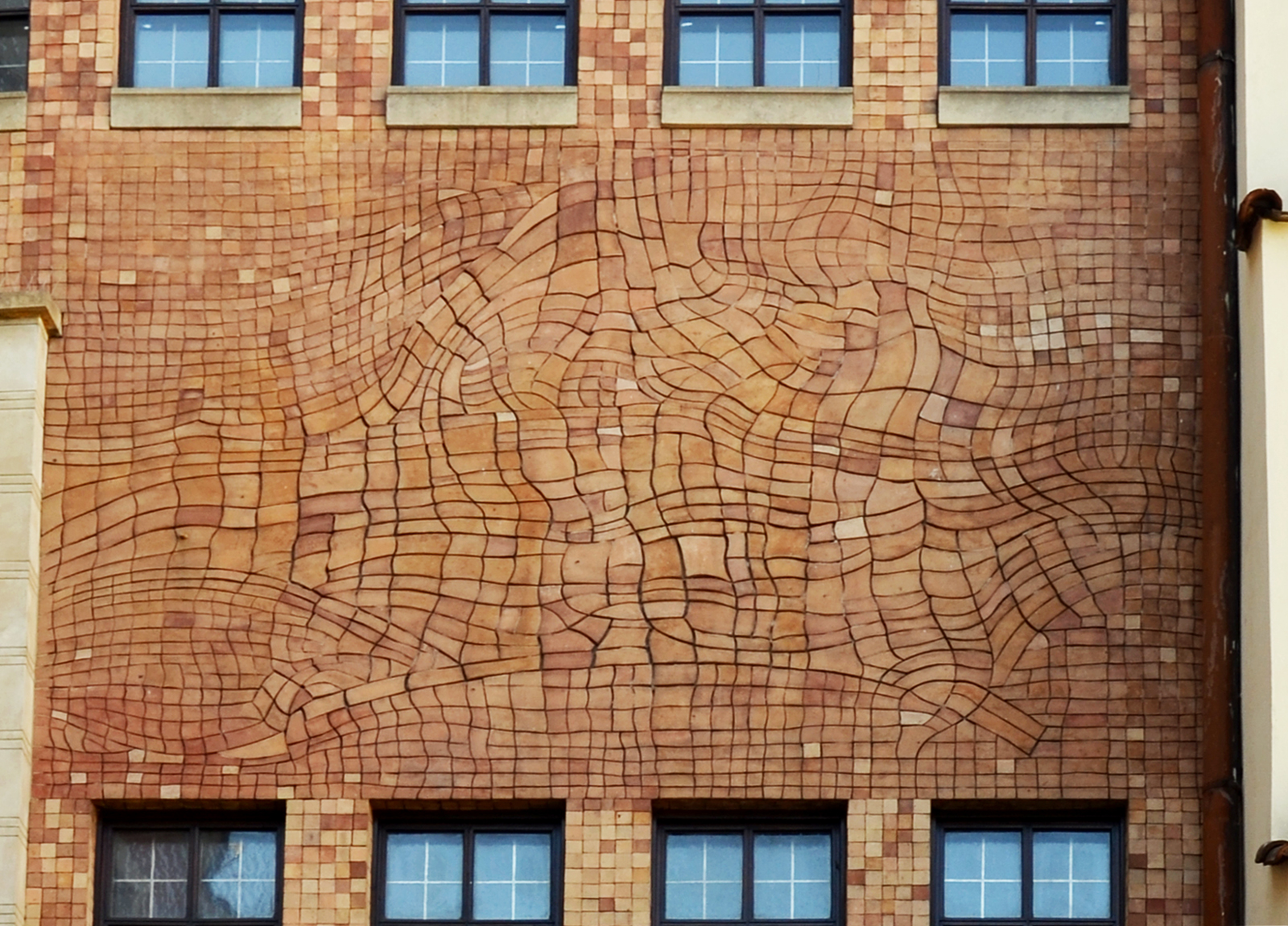
Peter Oriešek, Jindra Viková, ceramic picture, 1975, Old Town Hall in Prague

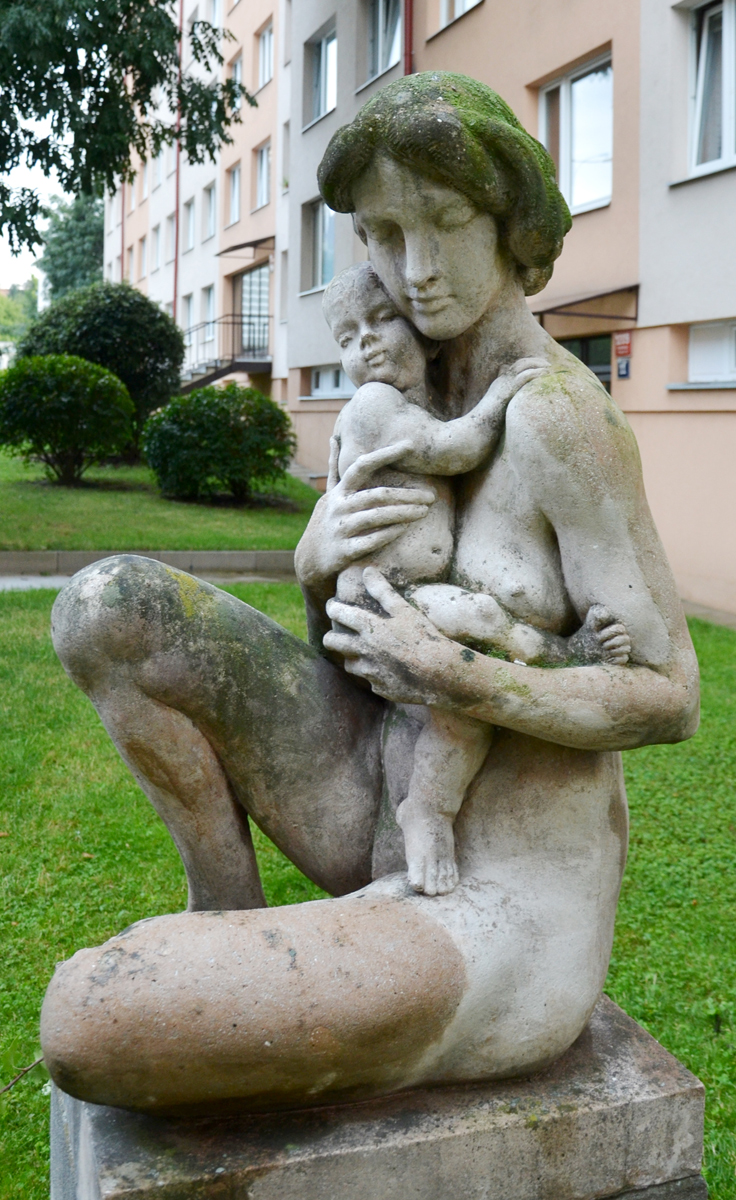
Mother with child, 1982, artificial stone, Prague-Strašnice

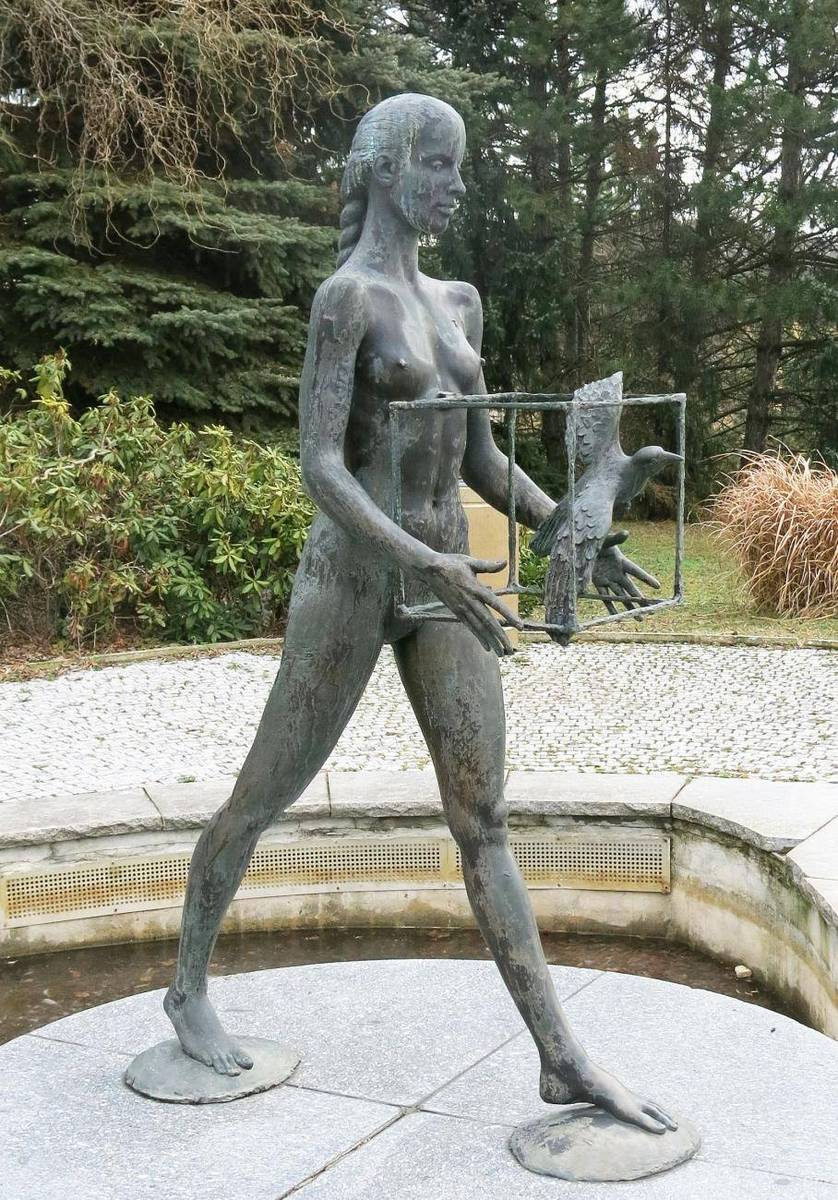
Sculpture of a girl with a cage (1989), park behind the congress centre of the Na Homolce hospital, Prague

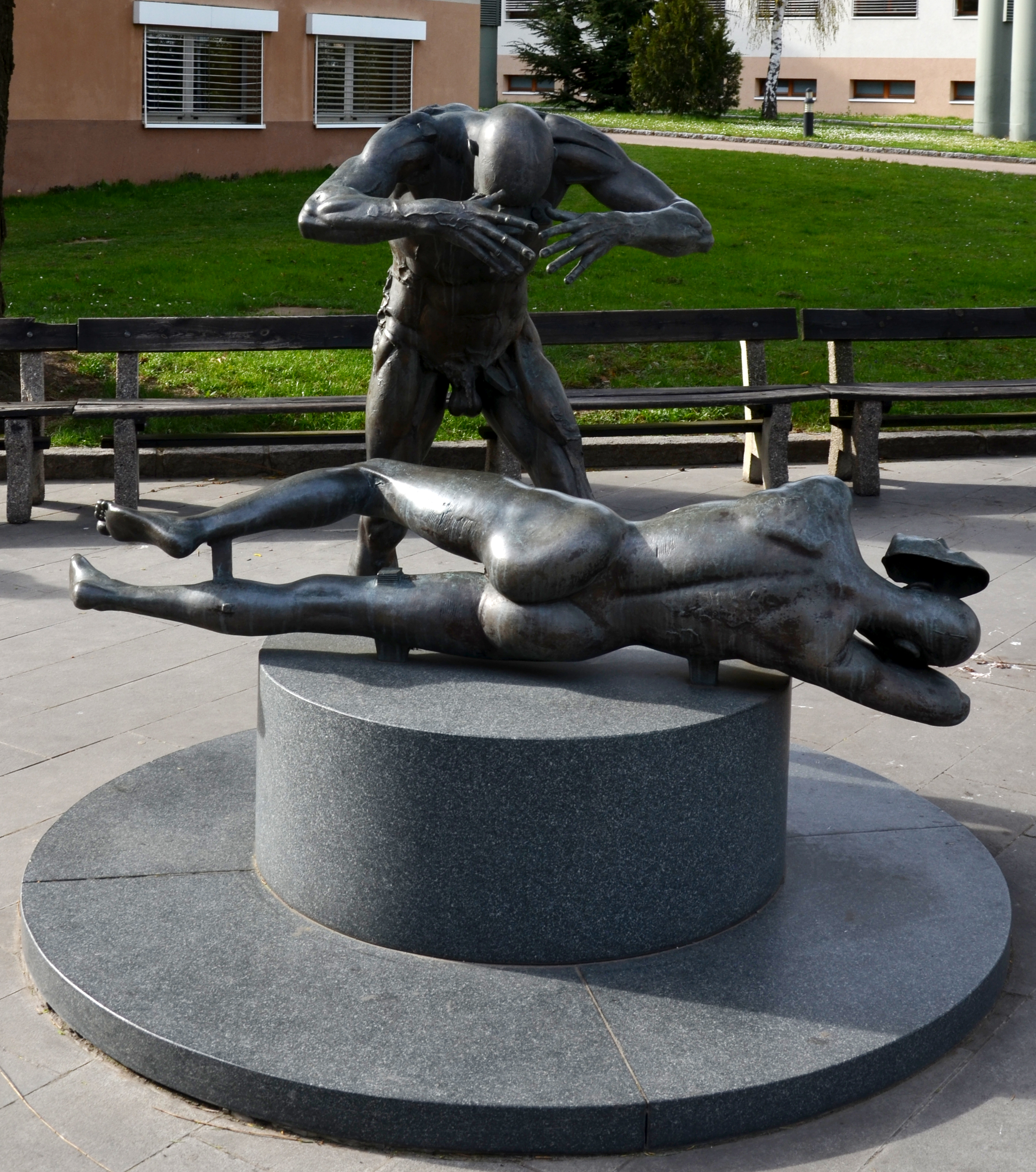
Photographer and model, 1995, bronze, Central Military Hospital Prague

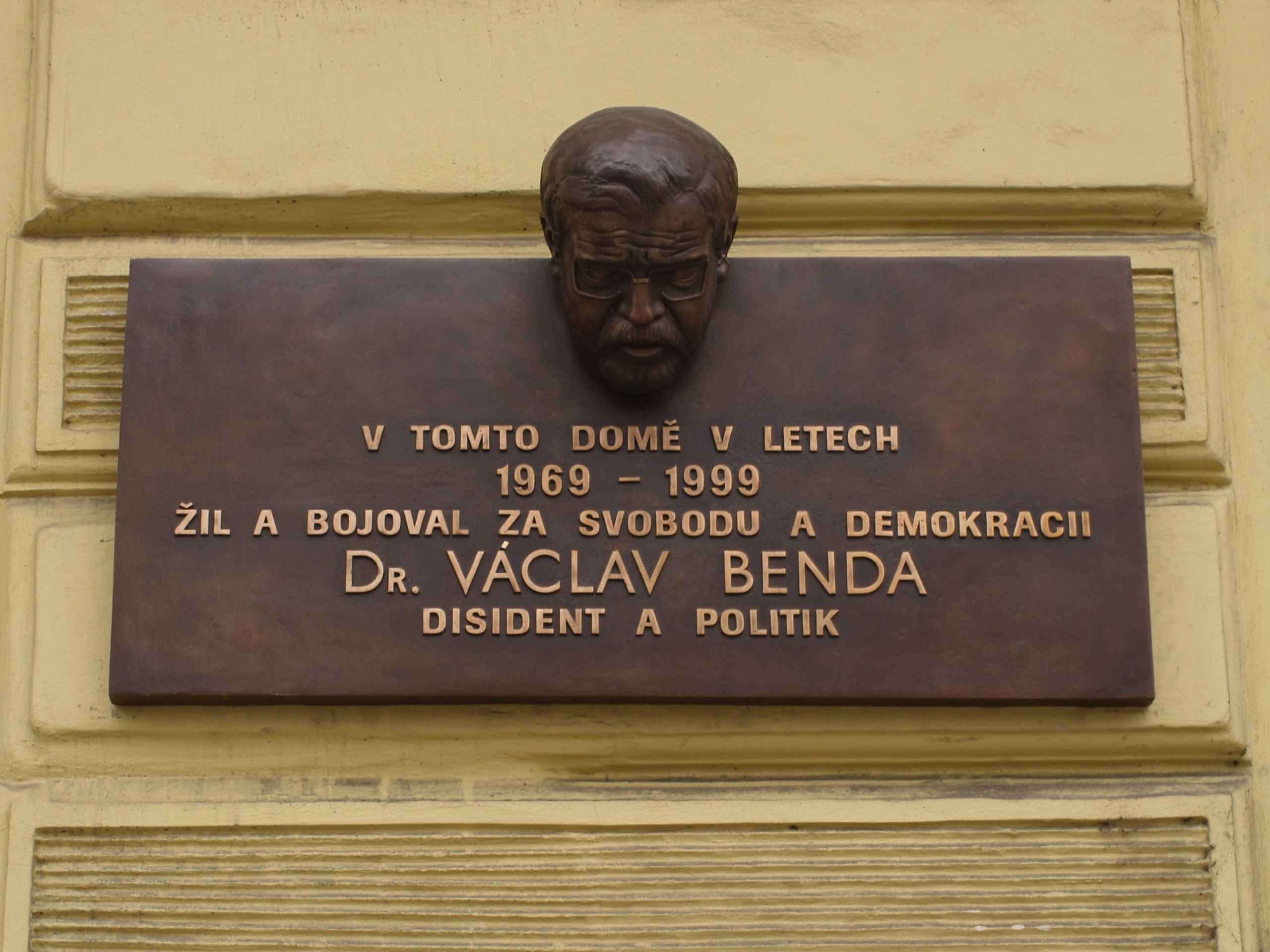
Václav Benda – memorial plaque

=== Representation in collections ===
- National Gallery Prague
- Slovak National Gallery Bratislava
- Moravian Gallery in Brno
- Gallery of the Central Bohemian Region (GASK), Kutná Hora
- Aleš South Bohemian Gallery, Hluboká nad Vltavou
- Gallery of Fine Arts in Cheb
- Gallery Klatovy/Klenová
- Museum of Art Olomouc
- Slovácké muzeum Uherské Hradiště

== Sources ==
=== Author catalogues ===
- Peter Oriešek, Petra Oriešková, Galerie mladých (U Řečických) / Gallery of Youth (U Řečických), Prague 1969
- Peter Oriešek: Kresby / Drawings, House of Culture ROH, České Budějovice, AJG Hluboká nad Vltavou (text H. Rulíšek) 1986
- Petra Oriešková, Peter Oriešek, kresby, plastiky / drawings, sculptures, text by Simeona Hošková, Graphic Cabinet Olomouc 1989
- Petra Oriešková: obrazy, Peter Oriešek: plastiky / Petra Oriešková: paintings, Peter Oriešek: sculptures, text I. Neumann, Bratislava, Povážska Galéria, Žilina 1991
- Peter Oriešek: Kresby / Drawings, Galerie Litera, text by I. Neumann, Prague 1992
- Peter Oriešek: Hřích a trest / Sin and Punishment, Galerie Litera, Prague 1994
- Peter Oriešek: Krutost pravdy / The Cruelty of Truth, text by Vlastimil Tetiva, Věra Procházková Foundation, Strakonice 1998
- Peter Oriešek: Zdrcující věcnost, text Ivan Neumann, Městské muzeum a galerie, Hranice 1999
- Soma Sema (Peter Oriešek, Kryštof Hošek), text Ivan Neumann, 88 s., Museum Kampa – Nadace Jana a Medy Mládkových, Praha 2021, ISBN 978-80-270-9706-7

=== Collective catalogues and publications (selection) ===
- Holub Karel, Mladí čeští sochaři / Young Czech Sculptors, Odeon Prague, 1978
- Konečný Dušan, Umění a doba / Art and Time, Odeon Prague, 1980
- Hošková Vomočilová Simeona, Mladá kresba / Young Drawing, Odeon Prague, 1984
- Jiří Kotalík, Volné sdružení "Tolerance" / Free Association "Tolerance", Art Jan Bernat, 1989
- Jiří Sozanský, Proti zdi / Against the Wall, with the support of Litera Gallery, Prague, 1991
- Barok a dnešek / Baroque and Today, Symposion 1994
- Tetiva Vlastimil, Podoby fantaskna v českém výtvarném umění 20. století / Images of the Fantastic in Czech 20th Century Art, cat. 94 p., Aleš South Bohemian Gallery in Hluboká nad Vltavou 1998
- Akademie výtvarných umění v Praze / Academy of Fine Arts in Prague, almanach 70 s., KANT publishing, Praha 2004
- Tetiva Vlastimil, České umění XX. století: 1970–2007 / Czech Art of the XXth Century: 1970–2007, cat. 326 p., Aleš South Bohemian Gallery in Hluboká nad Vltavou 2007 ISBN 978-80-86952-42-0
- Hološka Ľ a kol., Figurama 09, cat. 528 p., Typos, printing works, a.s., Plzeň 2009 ISBN 80-903346-6-0
