= Dolná Súča =

Village and municipality in Slovakia

- Municipality
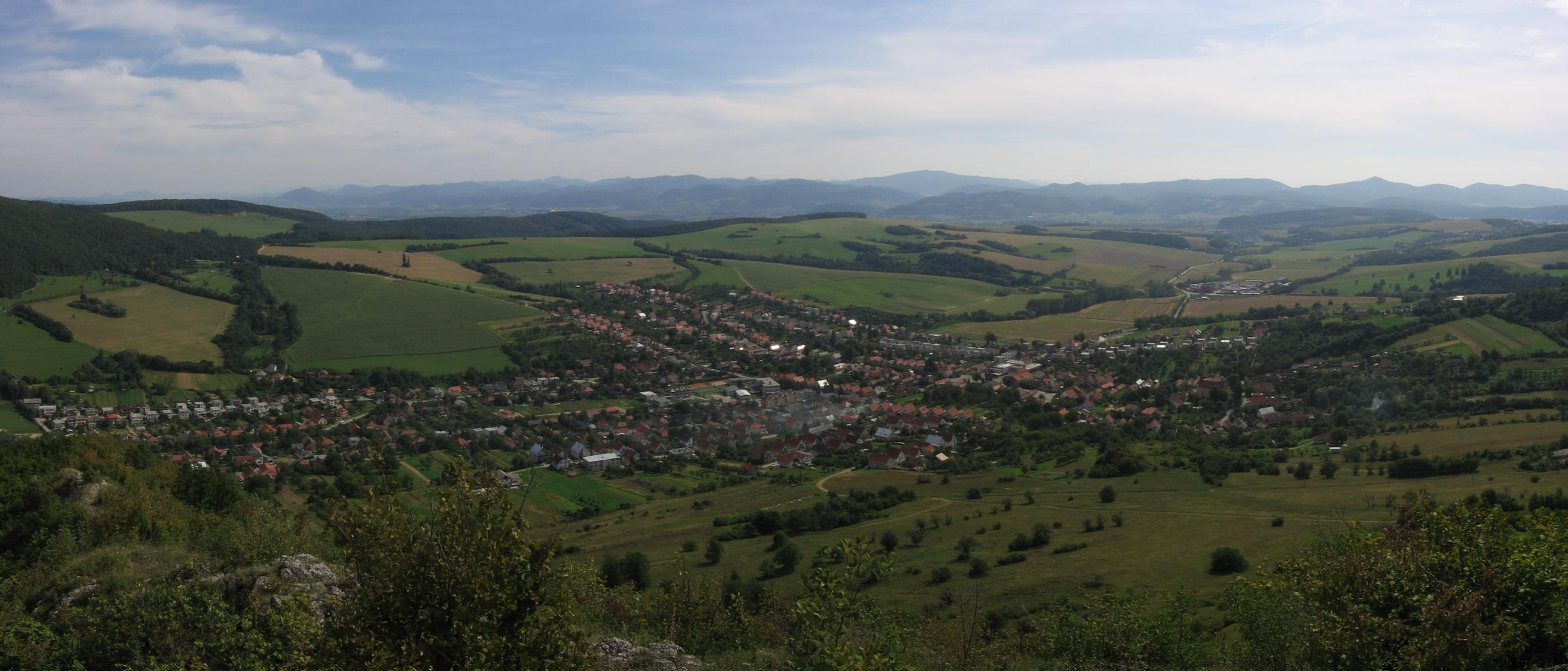

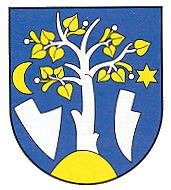
- Flag Coat of arms

- Location of Dolná Súča in the Trenčín Region Location of Dolná Súča in Slovakia
- Coordinates: 48.95°N 18.03°E
- Country: Slovakia
- Region: Trenčín Region
- District: Trenčín District
- First mentioned: 1208

Area
  - Total: 26.31 km^{2} (10.16 sq mi)
- Elevation: 363 m (1,191 ft)

Population (2025)
  - Total: 3,024
- Time zone: UTC+1 (CET)
  - Summer (DST): UTC+2 (CEST)
- Postal code: 913 32
- Area code: +421 32
- Vehicle registration plate (until 2022): TN
- Website: www.dolnasuca.sk

Dolná Súča (Hungarian: Alsószúcs) is a village and municipality in Trenčín District in the Trenčín Region of north-western Slovakia.

== History ==
In historical records the village was first mentioned in 1208.

== Geography ==
The municipality lies at an altitude of 363 metres (1,191 ft) and covers an area of 26.31 km^{2} (10.16 sq mi) (2025).

== Population ==
Population statistic (10 years)
Year	1995	2005	2015	2025
Count	2790	2921	3067	3024
Difference		+4.69%	+4.99%	−1.40%

Population statistic
Year	2024	2025
Count	3050	3024
Difference		−0.85%

It has a population of 3024 people (31 December 2025).

=== Ethnicity ===
Census 2021 (1+ %)
Ethnicity	Number	Fraction
Slovak	3022	98.79%
Not found out	36	1.17%
Total	3059	

In year 2021 was 3059 people by ethnicity 3022 as Slovak, 36 as Not found out, 12 as Czech, 10 as Other, 4 as Rusyn, 3 as Russian, 3 as English, 2 as Ukrainian, 2 as Austrian, 2 as Hungarian, 1 as German and 1 as Moravian.

Note on population: The difference values of population numbers in the table "Population statistic" and in the sections "Ethnicity" & "Religion" is caused by the use of various statistical methods.

=== Religion ===
Census 2021 (1+ %)
Religion	Number	Fraction
Roman Catholic Church	2591	84.7%
None	351	11.47%
Not found out	46	1.5%
Total	3059	

In year 2021 was 3059 people by religion 2591 from Roman Catholic Church, 351 from None, 46 from Not found out, 20 from Greek Catholic Church, 12 from Other, 11 from Ad hoc movements, 9 from Evangelical Church, 5 from Christian Congregations in Slovakia, 3 from Calvinist Church, 3 from Eastern Orthodox Church, 2 from Paganism and natural spirituality, 2 from Other and not ascertained christian church, 2 from Jehovah's Witnesses, 1 from Old Catholic Church and 1 from Buddhism.

== Genealogical resources ==
The records for genealogical research are available at the state archive "Statny Archiv in Bratislava, Slovakia"

- Roman Catholic church records (births/marriages/deaths): 1688-1896 (parish A)
- Lutheran church records (births/marriages/deaths): 1783-1895 (parish B)

== See also ==
- List of municipalities and towns in Slovakia
